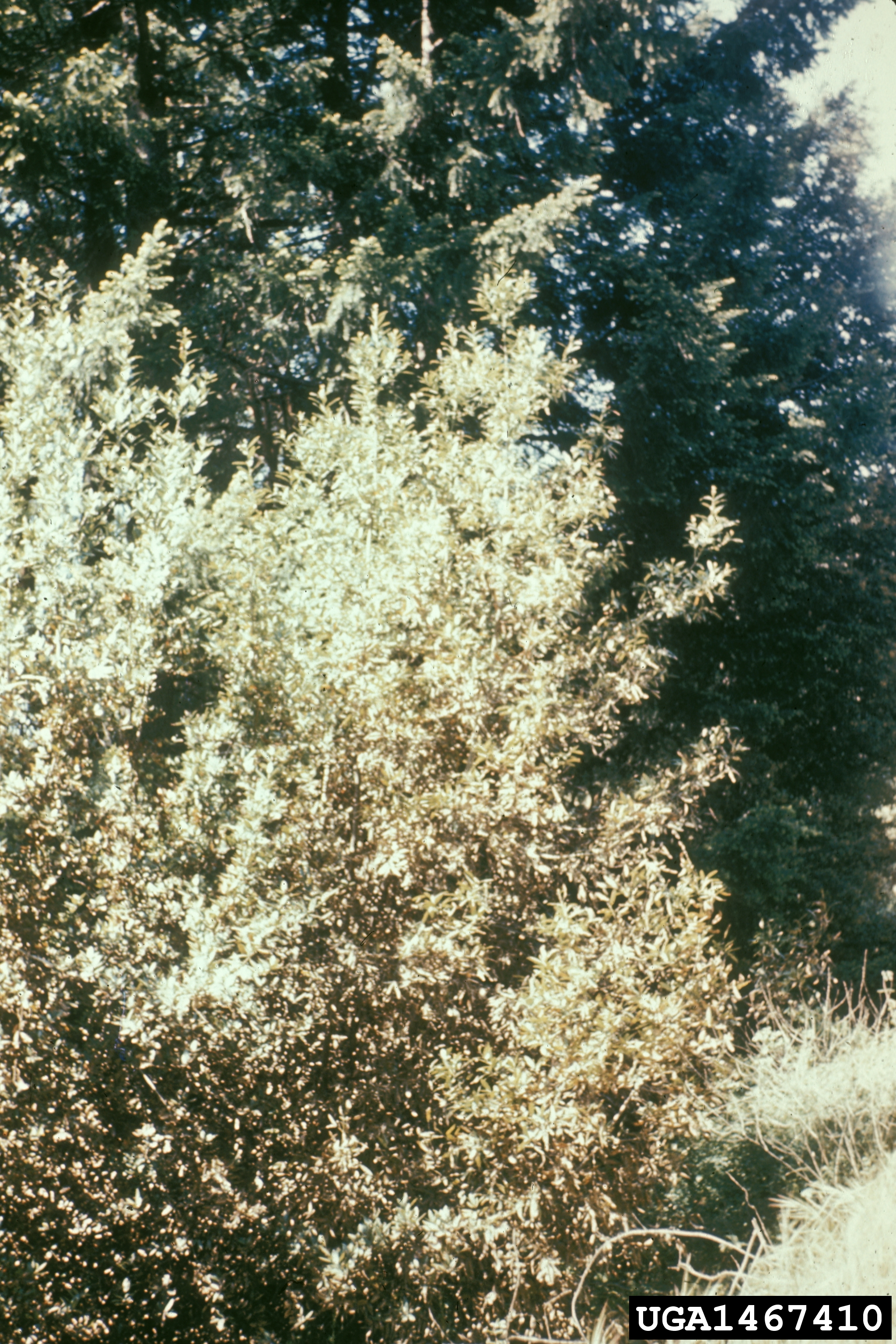
- Symptoms of bitter rot on California laurel caused by the fungus Colletotrichum gloeosporioides

Scientific classification
- Kingdom: Fungi
- Division: Ascomycota
- Class: Sordariomycetes
- Order: Glomerellales
- Family: Glomerellaceae
- Genus: Colletotrichum
- Species: G. cingulata

Binomial name
- Glomerella cingulata (Stoneman) Spauld. & H. Schrenk

Synonyms
- Colletotrichum gloeosporioides; Glomerella rufomaculans-vaccinii

= Glomerella cingulata =

Species of fungus

Glomerella cingulata is a fungal plant pathogen, being the name of the sexual stage (teleomorph) while the more commonly referred to asexual stage (anamorph) is called Colletotrichum gloeosporioides. For most of this article the pathogen will be referred to as C. gloeosporioides. This pathogen is a significant problem worldwide, causing anthracnose and fruit rotting diseases on hundreds of economically important hosts.

== Hosts and symptoms ==
C. gloeosporioides has an extremely broad host range, causing anthracnose disease on a variety of crops such as cereals and grasses, legumes, fruits, vegetables, perennial crops, and trees. It has been observed as infecting harvested durian of the species Durio graveolens. Some studies suggest that C. gloeosporioides has sub-populations specific to each host. The symptoms can vary from host to host, but tend to manifest as water soaked, sunken spots on fruit that turn necrotic as the disease progresses, and small dark lesions on leaves.

Using mangoes, one of the most economically important hosts, as an example, fruit symptoms manifest late in the season as infected fruit ripens to maturity. At this point fruit develops large, sunken areas of decay that are dark brown to black in color. Occasional fruit cracking can also occur when linear necrotic lesions develop into deep cracks through the epidermis that can extend down into the pulp of the fruit. Because symptoms remain unseen before ripening, plants that appear healthy upon picking can become quickly riddled with disease in storage or transport. Mango leaves exhibit symptoms as small, angular, brown/black lesions that enlarge as the disease progresses. Again, these symptoms vary from host to host, but mangoes serve as a decent example for the general symptomatology of this pathogen.

In chestnuts, disease symptoms may also be called blossom end rot. Browning of the chestnut burs at the blossom end may be a first sign in August. At harvest time, blackening of pointed end of the chestnut shell and kernel indicates infection. The extent of blackening can be variable. It can range from a barely visible black tip of the kernel to the whole nut being black. Parts of the nut kernel with no color change remain edible. Regardless of host, C. gloeosporioides produces several signs useful for diagnosis. When observed under a dissecting microscope acervuli can often be spotted if the diseased tissue has recently been under sporulating conditions. These acervuli will appear orange to pinkish in color, due to the masses of conidia being produced on the surface, and will have black, hair-like, setae spiking out in several directions. Under a compound microscope conidia appear ovoid in shape. On certain hosts the teleomorph of this pathogen (G. cingulata) readily produces perithecia full of asci. When cultured on potato dextrose media, this species can appear gray, orange, or pink in color, and will often exhibit concentric rings of growth radiating from the center. C. gloeosporioides can also be identified by PCR if the required resources are available.

== Importance ==
The economic impact of C. gloeosporioides varies depending on the host species, but its major impact on some of the more economically important hosts makes the pathogen a huge concern for growers worldwide. For example, in strawberries produced in China, C. gloeosporioides, along with Colletotrichum acutatum, and Colletotrichum fragariae, cause up to 80% of plant loss in strawberry nurseries, and over 40% of yield loss in field. In just these two examples this pathogen is causing millions of dollars in losses.

== Classification ==
Recent research suggests that, due to the variability of C. gloeosporioides among hosts, this pathogen should be split into different species or at least different formal species designations. Phylogenetic analysis of C. gloeosporioides isolates sampled from across the broad host range shows enough genetic variation to suggest a need for more specific classification among this species. Work is being done to provide a modern classification system for what is being called the "C. gloeosporioides complex".

== Disease cycle ==
The disease cycle is impacted by which form of the pathogen (teleomorph or anamorph) is on the host. This distinction affects how the pathogen overwinters or survives periods without a susceptible host. If the sexual stage (teleomorph) is present, the pathogen sexually reproduces to form ascospores inside of asci, and subsequently packed into perithecia. This provides genetic variation and the convenience of perithecia, which can act as a survival structure. If only the asexual stage (anamorph) is present, the pathogen must survive inside of infected plant tissue or on an alternate host.

Once environmental conditions are met (<95% humidity, 25–28 °C), the ascospores are ejected and infected plant tissue sporulates. Ascospores infect directly, while the infected plant tissue produces acervuli that produce masses of conidia on conidiophores. These conidia are disseminated by rain splash or wind onto new infection courts such as leaves, young fruit, or blossoms. Upon infection, the pathogen continues to produce conidia throughout the season resulting in a polycyclic disease cycle. Once the host plant starts to senesce, the teleomorph form of the disease (G. cingulata) will sexually produce ascospores in perithecia to restart the cycle.

== Pathogenesis ==
C. gloeosporioides is a hemibiotroph, meaning it lives part way between the biotrophic and saprophytic lifestyles. The pathogen prefers a living host, but once the host tissue dies, or the pathogen finds itself surviving in the soil without a host, it can switch to a saprophytic lifestyle and feed off of dead plant material. Under correct environmental conditions, if a C. gloeosporioides conidium lands upon a susceptible host it will first produce an appressorium. This specialized structure allows the pathogen to penetrate the host cuticle and cell wall through the production of a penetration peg. After penetration, the pathogen produces infection vesicles which invaginate the cell membrane, and drain nutrients from the plant. Later in the pathogen's life cycle, when the host's infected fruit or foliar flesh dies, the pathogen switches to the saprophytic life cycle to feed off of the dead tissue.

== Environment ==
This pathogen grows best at 25–30 °C, a humidity >95%, and a pH of 5.8 to 6.5. Pathogenesis can occur at a temperature range as broad as 20–30 °C. Acervuli release spores only when an abundance of moisture is present, so C. gloeosporioides is inactive during the dry season. Direct sunlight, extreme temperatures on either side of the optimum range, and low humidity can all cause spores to become inactive. These three factors can either be extreme enough to cause spore inactivation single-handedly, or work in concert to have the same effect.

== Management ==
Control methods vary depending on the host, but there are some general cultural practices that can be very useful for managing this pathogen. Because C. gloeosporioides spores are spread by rain splash, avoiding overhead irrigation can be helpful. If the operation is small enough the grower might want to consider an overhead covering to avoid rainfall all together. Pruning and thinning out of vegetative material can provide extra airflow, preventing high moisture conditions necessary for disease propagation. Also, to insure a healthy crop to begin with, growers should propagate using only certified, disease-free stock. To prevent post-harvest storage rot, fruit are often subjected to hot water dips or wax coatings. While these methods have been shown to decrease disease incidence, they are not an efficacious solution for the prevention of post-harvest C. gloeosporioides infection.

In terms of chemical control, broad spectrum, protectant fungicides such as chlorothalinil or mancozeb can be applied at the beginning of the growth season to prevent infection. Frequently, once fruit have begun to grow, any further fungicide applications simply mask symptoms until post-harvest. During post-harvest treatment, harvested fruit are often coated with fungicides such as phenols or benzimidazoles to further protect against storage rot, especially on fruit being shipped overseas.

Both cultural and chemical practices need to work together to maintain a safe and practical spraying schedule for a grower. A forecasting system has been built using the humidity and temperature requirements for this pathogen. Using this system a grower can predict what sort of spraying schedule will be most useful for containing C. gloeosporioides.

== See also ==
- Pecan anthracnose
