= Colletotrichum kahawae =

Scientific classification
- Kingdom: Fungi
- Division: Ascomycota
- Class: Sordariomycetes
- Order: Glomerellales
- Family: Glomerellaceae
- Genus: Colletotrichum
- Species: C. kahawae

Binomial name
- Colletotrichum kahawae J.M. Waller & Bridge

Species of fungus

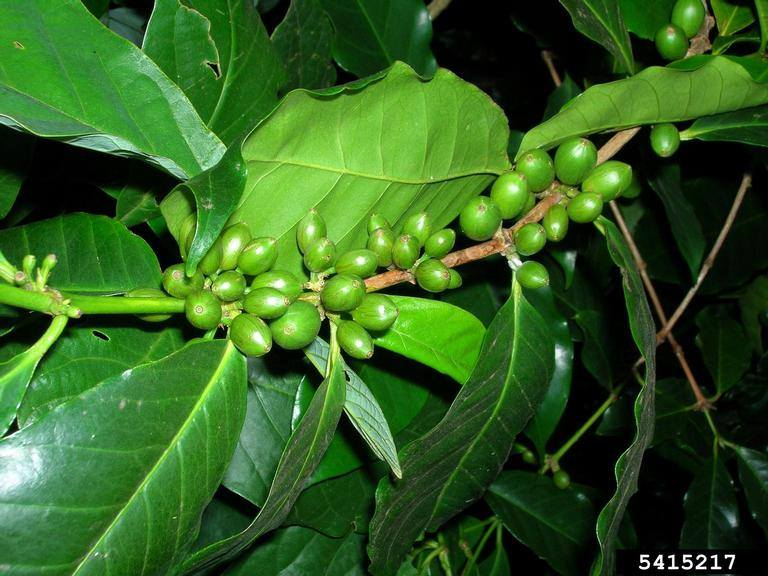
This is an example of a healthy Coffea arabica plant, the host of Colletotrichum kahawae.

Colletotrichum kahawae is a fungal plant pathogen that causes coffee berry disease (CBD) on Coffea arabica crops. The pathogen is an ascomycete that reproduces asexually. The asexual spores (conidia) are stored within acervuli. This disease is considered to be one of the major factors hampering C.arabica production in the African continent, which represents the current geographic range of the fungus. Coffee berry disease causes dark necrosis in spots and causes the green berries of the coffee to drop prematurely. High humidity, relatively warm temperatures, and high altitude are ideal for disease formation. Given the severity of the disease and the lack of effective control measures, there is great concern that the fungus may spread to other coffee producing continents, such as South America, which could have catastrophic consequences.

== Taxonomy ==
Until recently, the taxonomic description and position of C. kahawae was a subject of great confusion. From the range of Colletotrichum spp. that are isolated from coffee plants, four groups were initially described based on their morphological traits: CCM (C. coffeanum mycelial), CCA (C. coffeanum acervuli), CCP (C. coffeanum pink) and the Coffee berry disease (CBD) strain. The three former groups were later recognized as C. gloeosporioides Penz (CCM and CCA) and C. acutatum Simmonds (CCP), and proved to be non-pathogenic in green coffee berries. Only the fourth group was able to infect both wounded and unwounded green berries and was formerly referred to as C. coffeanum. However, C. coffeanum was described in 1901 based on Colletotrichum isolated from coffee in Brazil, where CBD does not exist, and was probably synonymous with C. gloeosporioides, which occurs as a saprophyte or weak pathogen of ripe berries and damaged coffee tissue worldwide. Several authors attempted to emend this anomaly but it was not until 1993 that Waller and Bridge described C. kahawae as the causal agent of CBD and as a distinct species based on morphological, cultural and biochemical characters and more recently on multi-locus datasets. According to the American Phytopathological Society, C. kahawae is also a causal agent of the bacterial disease Brown Blight

== Host and symptoms ==
Areca catechu (betelnut palm), Citrus reticulata (mandarin), Coffea arabica (arabica coffee), Coffea canephora (robusta coffee), Coffea liberica (Liberian coffee tree), Cyphomandra betacea (tree tomato), Eruca vesicaria (purple-vein rocket), Liquidambar styraciflua (Sweet gum), and Malus domestica (apple) are all hosts of C. kahawae. Infection can occur on all stages of the plant, from unopened inflorescences to ripe berries and occasionally leaves. The defining characteristic of C. kahawae is its ability to infect green berries; between 4–14 weeks after flowering it is most susceptible. There are two distinct symptoms of berry infections termed "active" and "scab" lesions. The common symptoms of the active lesions are dark brown, slightly sunken spots that begin small and eventually enlarges in area consuming the entire berry to become black. Consequently, the pulp becomes brown, hard, and brittle while the surface of the berry remains smooth (except for the fungal fruiting structures). Under humid conditions, the fruiting structures on the lesions may produce pink spore masses that become white with age. The scab lesions can be found on both young and mature berries in which the lesions are corky, pale tan in color, and slightly sunken. These lesions form stagnantly until the fruit begins to ripen creating a more beneficial environment for the fungus to grow. Secondary inoculum may be produced by the pathogen as seen by concentric rings that are surrounded by emerging black acervuli within the lesion. The active lesions will result in the arrest of berry development depending on favorable weather conditions. This process will in turn result in berry mummification on the branch, and when the berry begins to ripen anthracnose will develop causing the bean to then become infected.

== Disease cycle and epidemiology ==
The polycyclic disease cycle of Colletotrichum kahawae is heavily dependent on rain/water for conidial production, dispersion, germination and infection. The timing of infection is regulated by the seasons and rainfall. Coffee growing regions of Africa receive two seasons of rain: long rains and short rains with relatively dry weather in between. The long rains are what induce initial flowering and therefore, initial infection. Short rains induce secondary flowering, but do not contribute to the severe infections of CBD. C. kahawae is an ascomycete that produces conidia from simple hyphae for which its perfect state is still unknown. Mummified berries and twig bark are considered to be primary sources of inoculum for the disease. The spores are covered in a gelatinous coat which expands under wet conditions to facilitate in spore dispersal during rain. Spore movement is downward in tree canopies due to movement being controlled by water films. This characteristic is a reason why coffee crowns are important sources of inoculum in coffee berry disease (CBD). Spores are laterally dispersed between trees and branches by wind and rain, yet localized, downward movement is the prototypical inoculum movement. Common vectors of long and medium-distance dispersal are: Birds, Coffee harvesters, and sometimes insects.

Colletotrichum conidium germination can occur 24 hours after contact with the host plant tissue. Then follows elongation of the germ tube, whose apical section differentiates into a melanised appressorium. This structure will then function to penetrate the plant cell cuticle directly via turgor pressure. C. kahawae is a hemibiotroph that exhibits a transient post-penetrative asymptomatic biotroph phase followed by a necrotrophic phase in which symptoms of CBD are seen. During the biotroph phase, the pathogen invades the host cells without killing them. The fungus then feeds on the living tissue for a period of 48–72 hours post inoculation depending on the isolate aggressiveness. The second phase of feeding, the necrotrophic phase, involves the increased activity of cell-wall degrading enzymes to function in C. kahawae pathogenicity. The colonization is associated with severe cell wall alterations and death of the host protoplast.

== Origin and distribution ==
The first report of coffee berry disease caused Colletotrichum kahawae dates back to 1922 in western Kenya when it led to the destruction and abandon of C. arabica plantations in some regions. Soon after, the fungus has quickly spread throughout most of the African continent, being reported in Angola (1930), Democratic Republic of the Congo (1938), Cameroon (1955), Tanzania (1964), Ethiopia (1971), Malawi and Zimbabwe (1985), and eventually most of the Arabic coffee areas in the continent were affected. Until 2018, the disease remained constrained to the African continent, but reported occurrence now includes Colombia and Cuba in the Americas with Hainan island in Asia.

== Environment ==
CBD has a high incidence of occurring in highland regions and there is only disease beyond 1000 meters above sea level (m.a.s.l.) (altitude to which C. arabica is grown). The disease is highly dependent upon climatic factors: humidity, rainfall, and temperature. As stated above, rainfall is necessary for spore germination and dispersal for C. kahawae. Temperatures of 20–22 °C (68–72 °F) are optimal for germination and mycelial growth. Appressorium formation occurs at the same temperatures and at a high relative humidity.

== Management ==
Current methods for control of coffee berry disease are resistance and fungicide applications. A study found that there are major genes on three different loci controlling resistance to CBD. The major cultivars being grown with high resistance to the disease are C. arabica L. var. Rume Sudan and the spontaneous hybrid Hibrido de Timor (HdT). Plants bred from these varieties (Catimor, Ruiru 11, etc.) are being used to develop better resistance through gene stacking approaches. This process is made more difficult when a variety that has been bred for high resistance develops undesirable traits ( low yield, poor bean profile, etc.) for commercially produced products, as seen in the Catimor variety. Coffee growing regions outside of Africa are in the process of developing new coffee varieties or increasing the level of resistance in current commercial varieties to CBD as a precaution to the spread of the pathogen. This process is undertaken using artificial methods of screening to detect CBD in young coffee crops (commonly seed hypocotyls) to speed up the resistance screening process.

Fungicide applications are the primary management tactic carried out. Different copper-based fungicides, organic fungicides, as well as mixtures of the two are recommended to control CBD. Copper-based fungicides are used the most due to their low-cost compared to organic fungicides; yet they become expensive when disease intensity requires 7-8 applications per year. This process can become laborious, expensive, and destructive to the soil ecology. CBD's chemical control may account for up to 45% of the annual cost of production in some fields. Despite such elaborate control measures, losses as high as 50% of the potential crop may still occur under unfavorable weather conditions.

Cultural practices are suggested to be interwoven in conventional management tactics. These methods include pruning infected branches, destruction of infected material, removal of mummified berries, minimizing optimal microclimatic conditions for pathogen growth, and the use of competitive and antagonistic microorganisms in the plant phyllosphere. Colletotrichum kahawae has been shown to produce less disease when shaded by fruit trees, as the fruit trees prevent rainfall from falling on berries, thus preventing dispersal of conidia. It has also been noted that the use of the fungus Fusarium stilboides Wollenv and Epicoccum nigrum Link and some yeasts could function in limiting CBD progression. A recent publication has identified and characterized Streptomyces species with strong antagonism towards C. kahwae. These potential biocontrol tactics would then need to be balanced with the use of fungicides due to observations that repeated fungicide applications increased CBD by removal of fungal biocontrols.

== Impact ==
There are limited control options once CBD has established on a host. The use of fungicides on susceptible varieties can be extremely costly especially as the disease progresses. In Kenya, it is estimated that it would cost $500 per hectare to manage CBD with chemical control. Because coffee berry disease can become very severe and there is a lack of effective control measures, there is great concern that the fungus may spread to coffee growing areas in other continents, such as South America, which could have catastrophic consequences. Currently, however, the disease is only prevalent in areas Africa at high elevations and with high relative humidity. The disease has been recorded to cause up to 80% yield loss.
