= Colletotrichum coffeanum =

Scientific classification
- Domain: Eukaryota
- Kingdom: Fungi
- Division: Ascomycota
- Class: Sordariomycetes
- Order: Glomerellales
- Family: Glomerellaceae
- Genus: Colletotrichum
- Species: C. coffeanum

Binomial name
- Colletotrichum coffeanum F.Noack

Species of fungus

Colletotrichum coffeanum is a species of fungal plant pathogen affecting mainly the species Coffea arabica and occasionally other species of the genus Coffea. Upon infection, the pathogen can cause coffee berry disease (CBD) which is also known as Brown Blight when it occurs on younger fruits still green in color. The fungus was first reported in Kenya in 1922, and is found throughout most of Africa. C. coffeanum is only found in Africa, but other species of Colletotrichum can be found throughout the rest of the world.

== Symptoms when infected ==
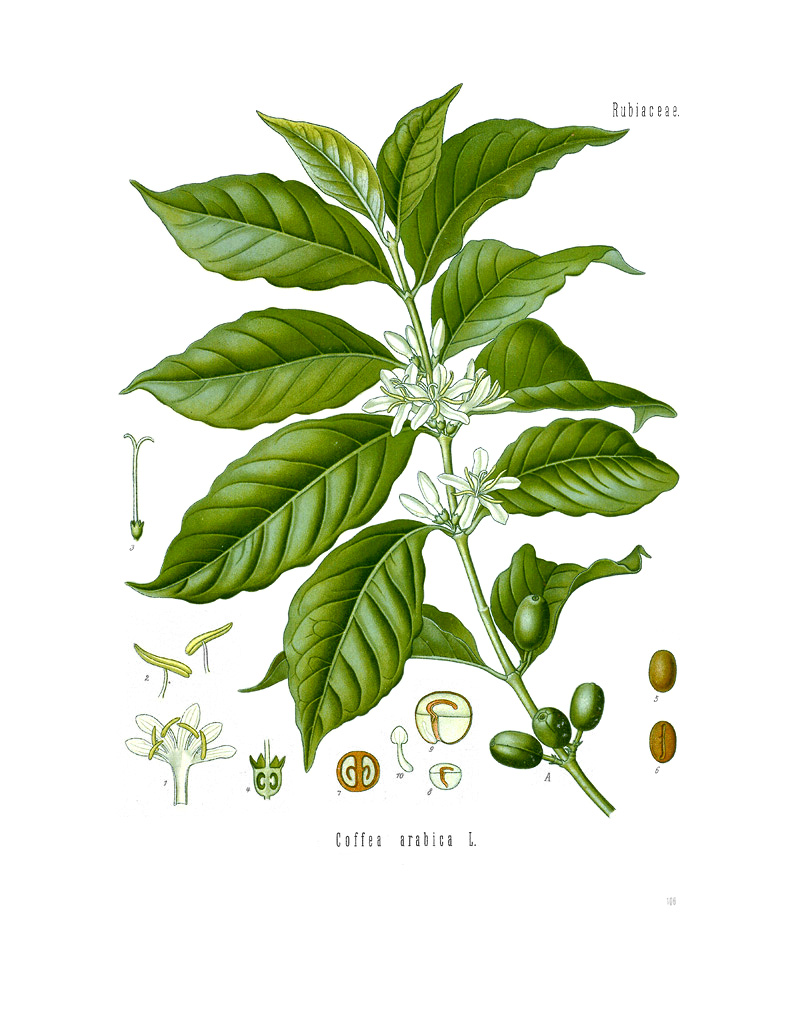
Healthy Coffea arabica

Infection can take place in as short a time as 2 hours, and can infect any part of the plant. Berries are most susceptible 4–14 weeks after flowering, during their expansion phase. Active lesions of the fungus are first noticeable as brown, sunken spots which quickly spread across the entire fruit. When C. coffeanum creates spores, it is evident by a pink crust on the surface of the infected area. The bean can stop growing if the infection is set early on in its development. The infection of the crop can significantly reduce the amount of fruit a farm can produce per year.

== Prevention ==
Pruning practices and the use of fungicides can aid in the prevention of infection by this pathogen. The most effective fungicides are "50% copper formulations, captafol, chlorothalonil, benomyl, thiophanate-methyl, thiabendazole, and dithianon."
