= Colletotrichum higginsianum =

Scientific classification
- Kingdom: Fungi
- Division: Ascomycota
- Class: Sordariomycetes
- Order: Glomerellales
- Family: Glomerellaceae
- Genus: Colletotrichum
- Species: C. higginsianum

Binomial name
- Colletotrichum higginsianum Sacc., (1917)

Plant pathogen

Colletotrichum higginsianum is an ascomycete pathogen that causes anthracnose disease on many plants in the Brassicaceae, including Arabidopsis thaliana and many cultivated forms of Brassica and Raphanus.

== Taxonomy and phylogeny ==
Colletotrichum higginsianum belongs to the phylum of Ascomycota. The order this fungus is categorized into is Glomerellas. The genus of Colletotrichum belongs to a class of fungi that are recognized for being a phytopathogen. There are over 248 different species of Colletotrichum and over 14 species complexes. The genus Colletotrichum was first proposed in 1831 (Joseph, 1831). Colletotrichum higginsianum was first isolated from leaf spot of turnips (Brassica rapa) in 1917. Its genome was first sequenced in 2012 through the use of short-read data from 454 GSFLX (350 bp) and Illumina GAII (100 bp) sequencing platforms and Sanger reads. Thus, unlocking a whole new realm of research for this interesting species. C. higginsianum forms part of a group of closely related taxa that also includes C. destructivum, which is a pathogen to tobacco and legume plant species, and C. linicola, a flax pathogen.

== Morphology ==
In order to identify Colletotrichum higginsianum, you would first start off searching for small, dark spots or water-soaked lesions on leaves, stems, or fruits. Reasoning one would look for these identifications is because Colletotrichum higginsianum produces spores in acervuli, which are fungal fruiting structures that break through the surface of the host tissue. While the fruiting structure of this fungus is growing on its host, it causes severe damage to the hosts tissue and cells. To make it even more interesting, Colletotrichum higginsianum additionally goes through multiple stages when infecting its host. In the initial stage, the fungus punctures through the host surface with appressoria. As time progresses, the hyphae inside the host cells will become bulbous biotrophic, which they can then proceed and transition into their final stage. During this final stage, the fungusi fully emerges, absorbing all the nutrients of the plant, essentially killing and destroying the host tissue. This would define its final stage as nectrotrophy (a parasitic process where an organism kills the living cells of its host and then feeds on the dead matter).

== Ecology ==
Colletotrichum higginsianum is a hemibiotrophic fungus. This means that in order for this fungus to obtain energy, it "first establishes a biotrophic interaction by evading the plant's defense mechanisms and later switches to a necrotrophic phase, in which it kills the host cells and feeds on them. Through research and studies, we have now observed that the role of a terpenoid in manipulating the host defense response was discovered through a forward chemical genetics approach, using Arabidopsis thaliana and C. higginsianum as the plantepathogen pair." Since this species is a pathogenic fungus, it can be found infecting species of the Brassicaceae family, including Arabidopsis thaliana, Brassica, and Raphanus. "Brassicaceae contains some 338 genera and more than 3,700 species of flowering plants distributed throughout the world". Additionally, Colletotrichum higginsianum can be found on multiple parts around the world since they infect common crops found globally. Data has shown us that the fungus does prefer to grow in environments that are tropical or subtropical. Some examples of countries would be Tunisia, China, and Hubei. Additionally, this fungusi is found in various countries in Europe. Another important factor is the temperature that the fungus can survive in. Colletotrichum species, including C. higginsianum, generally survive in temperatures ranging from 20-30 degrees Celsius.Laaslty, since this fungus can be located on a diversity of plant species and geographically, this makes controlling or the regulation of this fungus so much harder.

== Overall biology and relevance for humans ==
Being a fungus that can be found on multiple parts of the globe, Colletotrichum higginsianum is economically important for humans because it can infect thousands of different species of flowering species, such as but not limited to: basket-of-gold (Aurinia saxatilis), cabbage and relatives (genus Brassica), peppergrass (genus Lepidium), wasabi (Eutrema japonicum), and wild radish (Raphanus raphanistrum). This directly affects humans because it causes diseases to plants which results in decreased yield in crops. Additionally, since they are nectrophoic during its final stage, this kills and destroys the host tissue, resulting in more crops dying. In regions where they do not have the ability to expend extra resources on crops or agriculture, one sweep of this pathogenic fungusi could not only be detrimental to the plant species, but significantly decrease the production of food and medicine. It is also important to notate that if crops were to become infected with this fungus, it is very easy to spread to other plant species since this fungus can disperse its spores via wind and or water-splashing (Spores are embedded in a slimy matrix and can be spread to nearby plants by splashing water). This makes it even more of a challenge combating against this fungus and controlling its invasion. Now at this current time, there aren't any direct applications or use for Colletotrichum higginsianum. Thankfully, current studies are being conducted in order to maintain control of the anthracnose disease (group of a fungal diseases that causes dark lesions on leaves, stems, flowers, and fruits of many trees). "By recognizing host physical and chemical cues, C. higginsianum conidia differentiate melanized appressorium, an infection structure, at the tips of conidial germ tubes. Appressorium formation is required for successful infection since the fungus penetrates the cuticle and plant cell wall by utilization of enormous turgor pressure in melanized appressoria for further invasive growth. Thus, inhibition of melanized appressorium formation will facilitate the efficient control of anthracnose disease". This translates into the objective of seizing or preventing the formation of appressorium (a specialized structure that some parasitic fungi use to attach to and penetrate a host plant or animal) in order to maintain control of the fungal disease that infects plant species. Furthermore, lowering the infection rate of fungal pathogens in various plant species.

== Sources ==
- August Carl Joseph, Corda (1831). Sturm, Jakob (ed.). Deutschlands Flora in Abbildungen nach der Natur mit Beschreibungen (in German). Vol. 3. Nürnberg, Germany. pp. 33–64.
- Dallery, Jean-Félix; Le Goff, Géraldine; Adelin, Emilie; Iorga, Bogdan I.; Pigné, Sandrine; O'Connell, Richard J.; et al. (26 April 2019). "Deleting a Chromatin Remodeling Gene Increases the Diversity of Secondary Metabolites Produced by Colletotrichum higginsianum" (PDF). Journal of Natural Products. 82 (4): 813–822. doi:10.1021/acs.jnatprod.8b00796. PMID 30776231.
- Dallery, Jean-Félix; Zimmer, Marlene; Halder, Vivek; Suliman, Mohamed; Pigné, Sandrine; Le Goff, Géraldine; et al. (30 May 2020). "Inhibition of jasmonate-mediated plant defences by the fungal metabolite higginsianin B". Journal of Experimental Botany. 71 (10): 2910–2921. doi:10.1093/jxb/eraa061. PMC 7260715. PMID 32006004.
- O'Connell, Richard J; Thon, Michael R; Hacquard, Stéphane; Amyotte, Stefan G; Kleemann, Jochen; Torres, Maria F; et al. (September 2012). "Lifestyle transitions in plant pathogenic Colletotrichum fungi deciphered by genome and transcriptome analyses". Nature Genetics. 44 (9): 1060–1065. doi:10.1038/ng.2372. PMC 9754331. PMID 22885923.
- Petruzzello, Melissa (3 March 2023). "List of plants in the family Brassicaceae". Encyclopedia Britannica.
- Shahi, Ayousha; Mafu, Sibongile (December 2021). "Specialized metabolites as mediators for plant–fungus crosstalk and their evolving roles". Current Opinion in Plant Biology. 64 102141. doi:10.1016/j.pbi.2021.102141. PMC 8671350. PMID 34814027.
- Wei, Wei; Xiong, Ying; Zhu, Wenjun; Wang, Nancong; Yang, Guogen; Peng, Fang (3 August 2016). "Colletotrichum higginsianum Mitogen-Activated Protein Kinase ChMK1: Role in Growth, Cell Wall Integrity, Colony Melanization, and Pathogenicity". Frontiers in Microbiology. 7: 1212. doi:10.3389/fmicb.2016.01212. PMC 4971432. PMID 27536296.
- Yan, Y., Yuan, Q., Tang, J., Huang, J., Hsiang, T., Wei, Y., & Zheng, L. (2018). Colletotrichum higginsianum as a model for understanding host–pathogen interactions: A Review. International Journal of Molecular Sciences, 19(7), 2142. https://doi.org/10.3390/ijms19072142
- Zampounis, Antonios; Pigné, Sandrine; Dallery, Jean-Félix; Wittenberg, Alexander H. J.; Zhou, Shiguo; Schwartz, David C.; et al. (25 August 2016). "Genome Sequence and Annotation of Colletotrichum higginsianum, a Causal Agent of Crucifer Anthracnose Disease". Genome Announcements. 4 (4). doi:10.1128/genomeA.00821-16. PMC 4991707. PMID 27540062.
