= Colletotrichum arachidis =

Scientific classification
- Kingdom: Fungi
- Division: Ascomycota
- Class: Sordariomycetes
- Order: Glomerellales
- Family: Glomerellaceae
- Genus: Colletotrichum
- Species: C. arachidis

Binomial name
- Colletotrichum arachidis Sawada, (1959)

Species of fungus

Colletotrichum arachidis is a plant pathogen, one cause of anthracnose (or canker) in peanuts.
