= Colletotrichum paspali =

Scientific classification
- Domain: Eukaryota
- Kingdom: Fungi
- Division: Ascomycota
- Class: Sordariomycetes
- Order: Glomerellales
- Family: Glomerellaceae
- Genus: Colletotrichum
- Species: C. paspali

Binomial name
- Colletotrichum paspali Crouch et al., 2009

Plant pathogenic fungi species

Colletotrichum paspali is a falcate-spored graminicolous plant pathogenic fungi species, first isolated from warm-season grasses.
