= Colletotrichum crassipes =

Scientific classification
- Kingdom: Fungi
- Division: Ascomycota
- Class: Sordariomycetes
- Order: Glomerellales
- Family: Glomerellaceae
- Genus: Colletotrichum
- Species: C. crassipes

Binomial name
- Colletotrichum crassipes (Speg.) Arx, Verh. K. Akad. Wet., (1957)

Species of fungus

Colletotrichum crassipes is a plant pathogen, originally described in grapes in Italy, also found in orchids, and known to cause human infection under some conditions.
