= Colletotrichum derridis =

Scientific classification
- Kingdom: Fungi
- Division: Ascomycota
- Class: Sordariomycetes
- Order: Glomerellales
- Family: Glomerellaceae
- Genus: Colletotrichum
- Species: C. derridis

Binomial name
- Colletotrichum derridis Hoof, (1950)

Species of fungus

Colletotrichum derridis is a fungal plant pathogen affecting Derris legumes in Taiwan, Indonesia, and Malaysia.
