= Colletotrichum somersetense =

Scientific classification
- Domain: Eukaryota
- Kingdom: Fungi
- Division: Ascomycota
- Class: Sordariomycetes
- Order: Glomerellales
- Family: Glomerellaceae
- Genus: Colletotrichum
- Species: C. somersetense

Binomial name
- Colletotrichum somersetense Crouch, 2014

Species of fungus

Colletotrichum somersetense is a morphologically cryptic species described by J.A Crouch in 2014. This species belongs to Colletotrichum caudatum sensu lato and is a pathogen on warm-season grasses (Sorghastrum nutans). Presence of a unique filiform appendage at the apex of the conidium is the distinctive morphological character.
