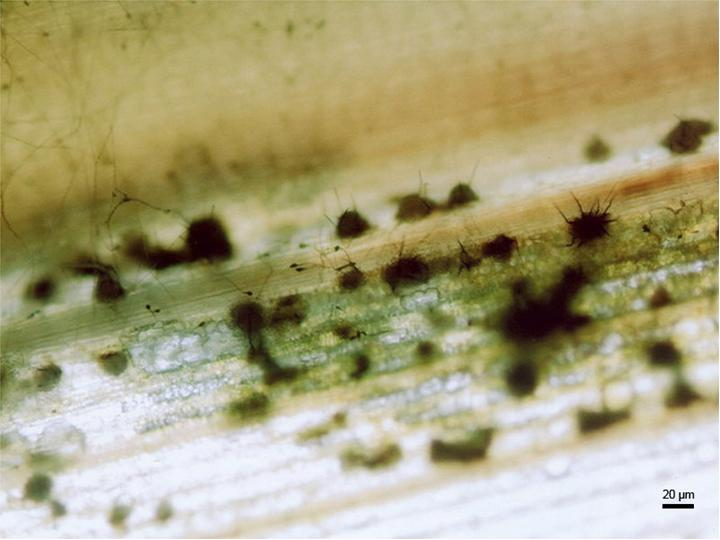

Scientific classification
- Kingdom: Fungi
- Division: Ascomycota
- Class: Sordariomycetes
- Order: Glomerellales
- Family: Glomerellaceae
- Genus: Colletotrichum
- Species: C. sublineolum

Binomial name
- Colletotrichum sublineolum Henn. [as 'sublineola'], (1913)

Synonyms
- Colletotrichum sublineola

= Colletotrichum sublineolum =

Species of fungus

Colletotrichum sublineola is a plant pathogen that causes anthracnose in wild rice and sorghum

Colletotrichum sublineola (wrongly named for many years as Colletotrichum sublineolum), is the causal agent of sorghum anthracnose, which is one of the most important diseases in sorghum and can cause losses up to 25%.

== Symptoms ==
Symptoms appear as small circular red/orange lesions with distinct margins on the upper portion of the stalks, leaves and seeds. The lesions can measure 2mm-2 cm and can contain dark brown fungal structures. Brown sunken areas can also appear on the stems.

== Management ==
Partners of the CABI-led programme, Plantwise recommend several methods for preventing spread of C. sublineolum, these include; planting two weeks after onset of rains, planting resistant varieties/hybrids and using certified seed from known seed dealers.

Crop rotation with other crops including soybean, groundnuts, cowpea and chickpeas can be used to prevent disease spread.

The disease can also be controlled by removing or burying crop residues after harvest. It is also recommended by Plantwise partners, including the National Agriculture Research Organization in Uganda to remove alternate hosts such as Johnson grass and any volunteer sorghum plants in the field.

== Sources ==
This article incorporates text from a free content work. Licensed under CC-BY-SA (license statement/permission). Text taken from PMDG: Anthracnose of sorghum (Ethiopia), Tadewos Ero (Plant Health Clinic, Kombolcha), Dejene Hirpa (Oromia Bureau of Agriculture), Ali Seid (Amhara Bureau of Agriculture), CABI. This article incorporates text from a free content work. Licensed under CC-BY-SA (license statement/permission). Text taken from PMDG: Anthracnose on Sorgum (Uganda), Moses Biruma and Robert Amayo (NaSARRI-NARO, Uganda), CABI.
