= Glomerella tucumanensis =

Scientific classification
- Kingdom: Fungi
- Division: Ascomycota
- Class: Sordariomycetes
- Order: Glomerellales
- Family: Glomerellaceae
- Genus: Colletotrichum
- Species: C. tucumanensis

Binomial name
- Colletotrichum tucumanensis (Speg.) Arx & E.Müll. (1954)

Synonyms
- Colletotrichum falcatum Went (1893); Physalospora tucumanensis Speg. (1896); Colletotrichum metake Sacc. (1908)

Species of fungus

Glomerella tucumanensis is a species of fungus in the family Glomerellaceae. It is a pathogen of sugarcane responsible for the disease known as red rot of sugarcane, this disease impacts sugarcane production in South and South-East Asia and has spread to 69 countries. It has been responsible for the elimination of many commercial varieties of sugarcane.

== Taxonomy ==
Glomerella tucumanensis was first described by Frits Went as Colletotrichum falcatum belonging to the family Melanconiaceae as a fungi imperfecti. This classification remained undisputed till 1943, when Carvajal and Edgerton found the conidial state of the fungi to be identical to Physalospora tucumanensis which was described by Spegazzini in 1896, putting it the family Pleosporaceae, thereby placing it under Ascomycota. In 1954, von Arx and Muller transferred the fungi to the genus Glomerella, where it remains today.
