= Colletotrichum mangenotii =

Scientific classification
- Kingdom: Fungi
- Division: Ascomycota
- Class: Sordariomycetes
- Order: Glomerellales
- Family: Glomerellaceae
- Genus: Colletotrichum
- Species: C. mangenotii

Binomial name
- Colletotrichum mangenotii Chevaug. [as 'mangenoti'], (1952)

Species of fungus

Colletotrichum mangenotii is a fungal plant pathogen. It produces single-celled, smooth brown conidia spores.
