= Colletotrichum trichellum =

Scientific classification
- Kingdom: Fungi
- Division: Ascomycota
- Class: Sordariomycetes
- Order: Glomerellales
- Family: Glomerellaceae
- Genus: Colletotrichum
- Species: C. trichellum

Binomial name
- Colletotrichum trichellum (Fr.) Duke, (1928)

Synonyms
- Amerosporium trichellum (Fr.) Lind; Sphaeria trichella Fr., (1817); Vermicularia trichella Fr., (1828)

Species of fungus

Colletotrichum trichellum is a fungal plant pathogen. It is known for causing leaf and stem spot in English Ivy.
