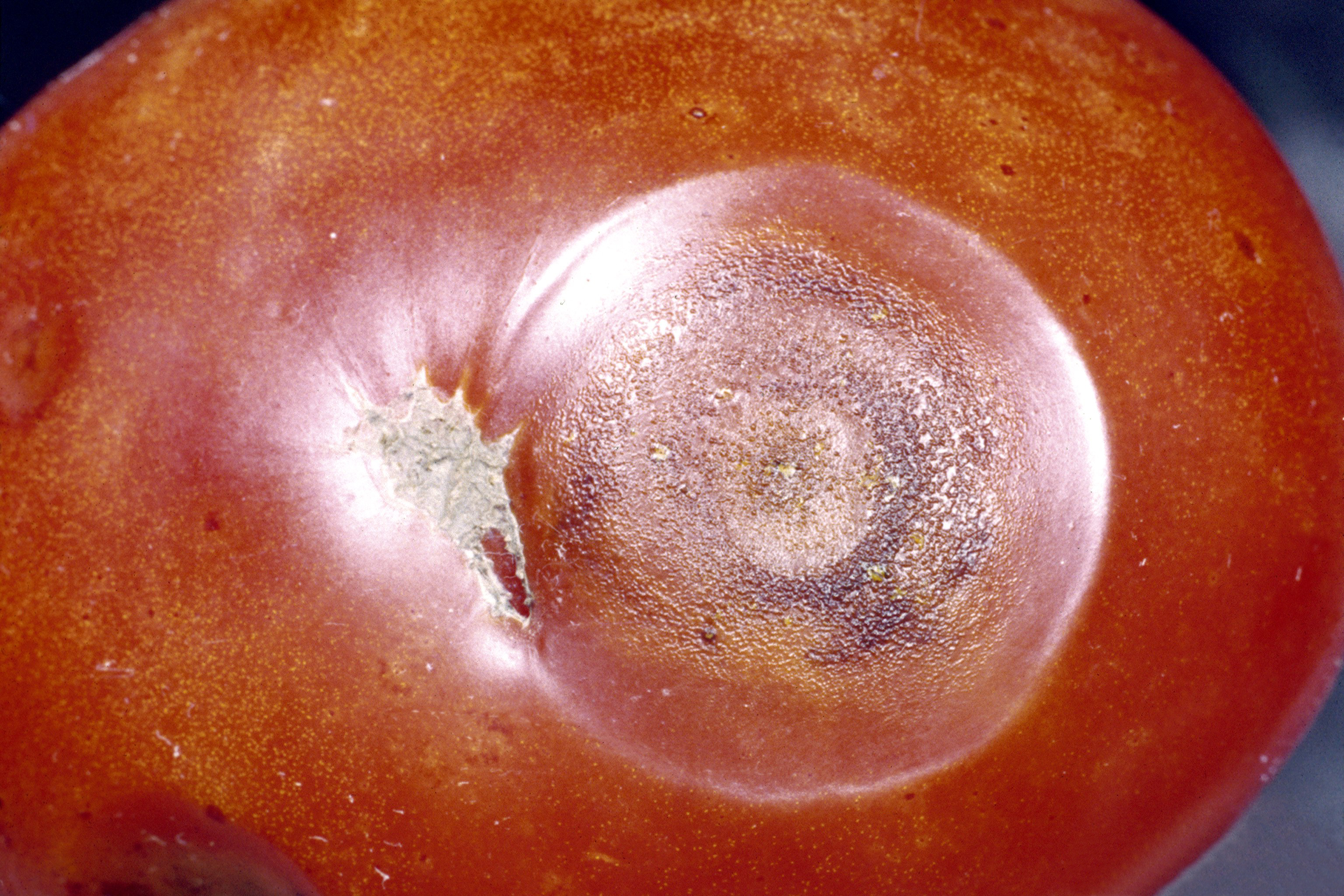
- Tomato anthracnose

Scientific classification
- Kingdom: Fungi
- Division: Ascomycota
- Class: Sordariomycetes
- Order: Glomerellales
- Family: Glomerellaceae
- Genus: Colletotrichum
- Species: C. coccodes

Binomial name
- Colletotrichum coccodes (Wallr.) S. Hughes, (1958)

Synonyms
- Chaetomium coccodes Wallr., (1833); Colletotrichum agaves Cavara, (1892); Colletotrichum antirrhini F.C. Stewart, (1900); Colletotrichum atramentarium (Berk. & Broome) Taubenh., (1916); Colletotrichum azaleae Ellis & Everh., (1895); Colletotrichum cajani Henn. Colletotrichum camelliae Massee, (1899); Colletotrichum commelinae Ellis & Everh., (1895); Colletotrichum crotalariae Petch, (1917); Colletotrichum cyclamenae Halst. Colletotrichum dioscoreae Tehon, (1933); Colletotrichum elasticae Zimm. Colletotrichum foliicola (Nishida) Sawada [as 'foliicolum'],(1959); Colletotrichum ipomoeae Sousa da Câmara, (1931); Colletotrichum kruegerianum Vassiljevsky, (1950); Colletotrichum melongenae Lobik, (1928); Colletotrichum opuntiae (Ellis & Everh.) Sawada, (1959); Colletotrichum phomoides (Sacc.) Chester, (1894); Colletotrichum piperatum Ellis & Everh. Colletotrichum primulae Moesz, (1924); Colletotrichum vanillae Verpl. & Claess., (1934); Gloeosporium alborubrum Petch, (1906); Gloeosporium amygdalinum Brizi, (1896); Gloeosporium cactorum Stoneman, (1898); Gloeosporium callae Oudem., (1903); Gloeosporium cingulatum G.F. Atk., (1892); Gloeosporium dendrobii Maubl., (1906); Gloeosporium elasticae Cooke & Massee; Gloeosporium eucalypti McAlpine, (1904); Gloeosporium foliicola Nishida [as 'foliicolum'], (1924); Gloeosporium fructigenum f. olivarum (J.V. Almeida) G.J.M. Gorter, (1962); Gloeosporium hawaiense Thüm. Gloeosporium lycopersici W. Krüger; Gloeosporium mangiferae Henn., (1898); Gloeosporium manihotis Henn., (1903); Gloeosporium melongenae Sacc., (1917); Gloeosporium ochraceum F. Patt., (1900); Gloeosporium oleae F. Patt., (1900); Gloeosporium olivarum J.V. Almeida, (1899); Gloeosporium opuntiae Ellis & Everh., (1888); Gloeosporium passiflorae Speg., (1899); Gloeosporium phomoides Sacc., (1882); Gloeosporium piperatum Ellis & Everh., (1891); Gloeosporium psidii Delacr., (1903); Gloeosporium rubicola Ellis & Everh., (1896); Gloeosporium syringae Allesch., (1895); Gloeosporium vanillae Cooke, (1886); Gloeosporium vexans G.F. Atk., (1897); Glomerella lycopersici W. Krüger; Phomopsis phomoides (Sacc.) Arx, (1957); Vermicularia atramentaria Berk. & Broome, (1850)

= Colletotrichum coccodes =

Pathogenic fungus

Colletotrichum coccodes is a plant pathogen, which causes anthracnose on tomato and black dot disease of potato. Fungi survive on crop debris and disease emergence is favored by warm temperatures and wet weather.

== Hosts and symptoms ==
C. coccodes is known for infecting potato and tomato, and is primarily a pathogen of Solanaceous plants more generally. Heilmann et al., 2006 characterizes genetic varieties and their associations with particular potato hosts. Buddie et al., 1999, finds strawberry is also a host. C. coccodes has a large host range beyond those including some Cucurbitaceae, Fabaceae, and Solanaceae.

C. coccodes can cause lesions, twisted leaves, and a bleached color on onion.

On tomato, can see that there are sunken in dark spots. As the disease continues to develop can begin to see spots that are rotting. The pathogen can infect both green and ripe fruit; spots are not evident on green right away, but over time they develop. Symptoms are most common on the fruit, but they may also appear on the stem, leaves, and roots.

In potato, C. coccodes is characterized by silvery lesions on the tuber surface which result in a deterioration in skin quality. In addition to causing tuber blemish symptoms, C. coccodes also causes symptoms on stems and foliage, which result in crop losses, and is implicated as a factor in the potato early dying disease complex. In the past the pathogen was not regarded as an issue, but it has become more prevalent.

== Disease cycle ==
Colletotrichum coccodes can survive the winter as hard, melanized structures called sclerotia. The pathogen may also survive in debris as threadlike strands called hyphae. In late spring the lower leaves and fruit may become infected by germinating sclerotia and spores in the soil debris. Infections of the lower leaves of tomato plants are important sources of spores for secondary infections throughout the growing season. Senescent leaves with early blight infections and leaves with flea beetle injury are especially important spore sources because the fungus can colonize and produce new spores in these wounded areas. The growth of C. coccodes is most rapid at 80 °F (27 °C), although the fungus can cause infections over a wide range of temperatures between 55–95 °F (13–35 °C). Wet weather promotes disease development, and splashing water in the form of rain or irrigation favors the spread of the disease.

The pathogen also produces an acervulus which is full of conidia that help to spread the infection.

== Management ==
Plant crops on well drained soils, use 3- or 4- year crop rotations with plants which are not hosts, and resistant plants. Sanitation can also be important to reduce the spread of inoculum and clean seed should be planted. Soil fumigants may also be used although they may not be as economic as the other methods of control. Irrigation is to be avoided when fruit begins to ripen to avoid the splashing of spores, it is also recommended to rotate with a nonsolanaceous crop every other year.
