= Colletotrichum truncatum =

Scientific classification
- Kingdom: Fungi
- Division: Ascomycota
- Class: Sordariomycetes
- Order: Glomerellales
- Family: Glomerellaceae
- Genus: Colletotrichum
- Species: C. truncatum

Binomial name
- Colletotrichum truncatum Species Fungorum. (2024). Speciesfungorum.Org. https://www.speciesfungorum.org

Synonyms
- Vermicularia truncata; Colletotrichum dematium f. truncatum; Glomerella truncata; Vermicularia capsici; Steirochaete capsici; Colletotrichum capsici; Colletotrichum capsici f. cyamopsidicola

Species of fungus

Colletotrichum truncatum is a fungal species and plant pathogen on soybeans. C. truncatum has a wide plant host range of about 400 plant species including economic crops like chili, pepper, tomato, soybean, pea, cowpea, and cabbage.

They are endophytic on Euphorbia hirta with another plant pathogen Uromyces euphorbiae (in the Pucciniaceae family and Pucciniales order).

== History ==
Soybeans have great importance worldwide as a source of oil and proteins for both humans and animals. Soybean anthracnose was first described in Korea in 1917. Soybean anthracnose is a very complex disease with C. truncatum being the most common associated species. Sixteen countries or regions around the world reported the presence of at least one Colletotrichum lineage associated with soybean crops creating a large potential impact to soybean crops.

A well known and studied pathogen Colletotrichum capsici was known to cause rot within chili plants. Extensive gene sequencing eventually proved that C. capsici and C. truncatum were genetically identical leading to the reclassification of C. capsici as a synonym.

In the past, the identification of Colletotrichum species was problematic because all species were incorrectly assumed to be host specific, which led to a huge number of described taxa. The three key species of chili anthracnose that had been widely reported in Southeast Asia, originally identified as C. capsici, C. gloeosporioides and C. acutatum were reclassified as C. truncatum. The infection of chili plants is not limited to C. truncatum; other Colletotrichum complexes have been shown to also cause anthracnose in chili plants.

== Disease Cycle and Transmission ==
=== Disease Cycle ===
C. truncatum can infect host seeds; in soybeans with a high degree of infection, C. truncatum was seen in both the seed coat and the embryo, there was no evidence of the embryo being infected without a seed coat infection.

In seedlings grown from 100 infected seeds, 10% of seeds did not germinate, 5% were infected with C. truncatum without showing symptoms and 11% grew as healthy seedlings, leaving 74% of the seeds which grew with symptoms of the fungal infection.

=== Transmission ===
Colletotrichum truncatum can be spread by wind; C. truncatum was found in samples over 240 meters away from a combine that was harvesting an area known to have Antrhracnose caused by C. truncatum during windy conditions (above 9kn/h). The sample were collected downwind from the combine, ensuring there was no cross-contamination from the machinery.

== Symptoms ==
Colletortichum in Pepper Plants

Colletortichum in Soybean

Symptoms appear as dark red to black lesions on the lower surface of the leaves. They appear as sunken lesions surrounded by a raised brown-black border on the pods, petioles and stems. Very small black fruiting bodies of the fungus are usually visible in older lesions.

Other symptoms include shedding of leaves, flower and pod abortion.

Infected seeds appear discoloured with brown or grey staining or dark flecks.

Infections on seeds can cause pre- and/or postemergence lesions. The symptoms C. truncatum are commonly characterized by dark, depressed, and irregular spots. Leaves may be shrunken, rolled or wilted, and may have necrotic laminar veins, resulting in premature defoliation of the plants.

== Management ==
Partners of the CABI-led programme, Plantwise including LUANAR recommend using certified, disease-free seed. If using saved seed, they recommend selecting seeds which are not shriveled mouldy or discoloured. They also recommend rotating soybean with cereals such as maize and sorghum every 2–3 seasons and remove any diseased crop residue and bury any remaining material.

Alum or potash alum (Potassium aluminum sulphate), a natural substance, has been shown to have antibacterial properties. It is a mineral found in nature in both pure and impure forms. Alum is a colorless, clear, odorless, crystalline mass or granular powder with a sweetish astringent flavor and it is highly soluble in water. Potash alum clearly reduced the mycelial development of C. capsici (C. truncatum) at the concentrations examined as compared to the control, which was not exposed to any alum concentrations. The size of the colonies decreased as the alum concentration increased (Fig. 3). The 5% alum concentration completely inhibited the pathogen’s mycelial growth as compared to the other concentrations that were studied.

== Other sources ==
This article incorporates text from a free content work. Licensed under CC-BY-SA (license statement/permission). Text taken from PMDG: Anthracnose on soybean, Chilasa S.L. (LUANAR), J.I.G. Masangwa (DARS), Shaibu Y.A. (KADD), CABI.
