= Colletotrichum hanaui =

Scientific classification
- Domain: Eukaryota
- Kingdom: Fungi
- Division: Ascomycota
- Class: Sordariomycetes
- Order: Glomerellales
- Family: Glomerellaceae
- Genus: Colletotrichum
- Species: C. hanaui

Binomial name
- Colletotrichum hanaui Crouch et al., 2009

Species of fungus

Colletotrichum hanaui is a falcate-spored graminicolous plant pathogenic fungi species, first isolated from warm-season grasses.
