= Colletotrichum cereale =

Scientific classification
- Kingdom: Fungi
- Division: Ascomycota
- Class: Sordariomycetes
- Order: Glomerellales
- Family: Glomerellaceae
- Genus: Colletotrichum
- Species: C. cereale

Binomial name
- Colletotrichum cereale Manns

Species of fungus

Colletotrichum cereale is a plant disease (fungus) that has been found to cause crown rot anthracnose of turf grass most commonly occurring on golf courses (NC State 2012). Anthracnose can occur as both a foliar blight and basal rot (Penn State 2010). This disease attacks the crowns of plants, which is different from other anthracnose diseases. Anthracnose of turfgrass can be a foliar disease or in this case a basal rot of the lower portion of the plant. It attacks different species of turfgrass throughout the world most commonly annual bluegrass and creeping bentgrass (Crouch, Clarke 2012).

== Hosts and symptoms ==
=== Symptoms ===
Colletotrichum cereale affects at least thirteen warm and cool season turfgrass species that are susceptible hosts. The two most common species that are affected are annual bluegrass and creeping bentgrass when they are grown in a managed setting such as a golf course. Anthracnose happens when the fungus infects the leaf sheaths (NC State 2012). Symptoms can include tissue color appearing brown or black; leaf blades appear orange or yellow (no lesions), and patchy appearance to turf on lawns and golf courses. Patches of the disease can range from different sizes either small irregular patches or giant large-scale areas (Settle, Martinez-Espinosa, Burpee 2006).

=== Signs ===
Signs of Colletotrichum include spore-bearing structures called acervuli in the center of leaf spots or brown/dead leaves being covered in acervuli. The acervuli are fruiting structures that will eventually produce asexual spores called conidia. The most common sign that can be attributed to this disease is tufts of black setae on the plant tissue, most commonly on dead tissue (Settle, Martinez-Espinosa, Burpee 2006). The disease is known to affect the host the most severely when the turf is thin or if there is very little of a certain species, when the turf is cut at low mowing heights, and when fertility is low (Crouch, Clarke 2012). It is able to single out and target turf species that are small in number compared to the dominant species. This can cause the patchy appearance in mixed turf settings. Other severe outbreaks have been known to selectively kill bluegrass when it is invading on a creeping bentgrass putting green (Settle, Martinez-Espinosa, Burpee 2006).

== Environment ==
Colletotrichum can occur all over the world infecting annual bluegrass. It is most commonly found on bentgrass in the eastern and southeastern United States (Michigan State 2016). This disease thrives in high moisture and can be found appearing after periods of heavy rainfall or excessive irrigation. The disease can occur in both cool and warm temperatures, which makes it a problem with it having no preferred temperature range. However, it has been found that the most common temperatures that the disease can exist in are warm, moist areas with temperatures around 78 degrees Fahrenheit or higher (Trugreen 2016). Moisture is the main factor that affects the disease. Other factors that contribute to the disease include root zone compaction, thatch accumulation, low fertility, low mowing height, and insect infestation.

== Disease management practices ==
=== Cultural control ===
Cultural practices that can reduce or control the spread of the disease include core aerification, dethatching, topdressing, light weight equipment to prevent compaction such as mowers, higher mowing heights, increased nitrogen, avoiding nighttime irrigation, and monitored irrigation to prevent long periods of leaf wetness (Settle, Martinez-Espinosa, Burpee 2006). These practices should be put in place before symptoms develop because some of them cause wounds that can increase the spread of the disease (Trugreen 2016).

=== Chemical control ===
Chemical management practices include the uses of fungicides. There are different types of fungicides including contact, penetrant, and systemic. Each of these is able to provide preventative and curative activity, however preventative is usually more effective at controlling the disease (Penn State 2010). Preventative is before infection and curative is after the infection is observed. Colletotrichum cereale has been found to have developed resistance to some kinds of fungicides in certain areas of the US (Settle, Martinez-Espinosa, Burpee 2006). Selecting the right fungicide and choosing when to apply it is very important in order for it to be effective against the disease.

=== Biological control ===
Biological control has a few options although studies are still being done to find an effective approach. Surface hydrophobicity has been found to induce spore germination, so the approach is to select annual bluegrass and creeping bentgrass with a non-waxy cuticle to try and interfere with germination of the conidia (Settle, Martinez-Espinosa, Burpee 2006). There are no known resistant cultivars of creeping bentgrass or annual bluegrass (Michigan State 2016).
