= Colletotrichum dematium f. spinaciae =

Scientific classification
- Kingdom: Fungi
- Division: Ascomycota
- Class: Sordariomycetes
- Order: Glomerellales
- Family: Glomerellaceae
- Genus: Colletotrichum
- Species: C. dematium
- Form: C. d. f. spinaciae

Trinomial name
- Colletotrichum dematium f. spinaciae (Ellis & Halst.) Arx (1957)

Synonyms
- Colletotrichum spinaciae Ellis & Halst. (1890); Vermicularia spinaciae (Ellis & Halst.) Vassiljevsky (1950)

Fungal plant pathogen

Colletotrichum dematium f. spinaciae is a plant pathogen.
