= Glomerella graminicola =

Scientific classification
- Kingdom: Fungi
- Division: Ascomycota
- Class: Sordariomycetes
- Order: Glomerellales
- Family: Glomerellaceae
- Genus: Colletotrichum
- Species: G. graminicola

Binomial name
- Glomerella graminicola D.J. Politis (1975)

Synonyms
- Colletotrichopsis graminicola (Ces.) Munt.-Cvetk. (1953); Colletotrichum graminicola (Ces.) G.W. Wilson (1914); Dicladium graminicola Ces. [as 'graminicolum'] (1852); Steirochaete graminicola (Ces.) Sacc. (1923); Vermicularia melicae Fuckel

Species of fungus

Glomerella graminicola is an economically important crop parasite affecting both wheat and maize where it causes the plant disease anthracnose leaf blight.

== Host and symptoms ==
Glomerella graminicola is an anamorphic fungus which is identified as Colletotrichum graminicola in the teleomorphic phase. It is the anamorphic phase that causes anthracnose in many cereal species. While the main host of this disease is maize, it can also affect other cereals and grasses, such as sorghum, ryegrass, bluegrass, barley, wheat, and some cultivars of fescue where the production of fruiting bodies cause symptoms to appear in the host plant. Corn anthracnose leaf blight is the most common stalk disease in maize and occurs most frequently in reduced-till or no-till fields.

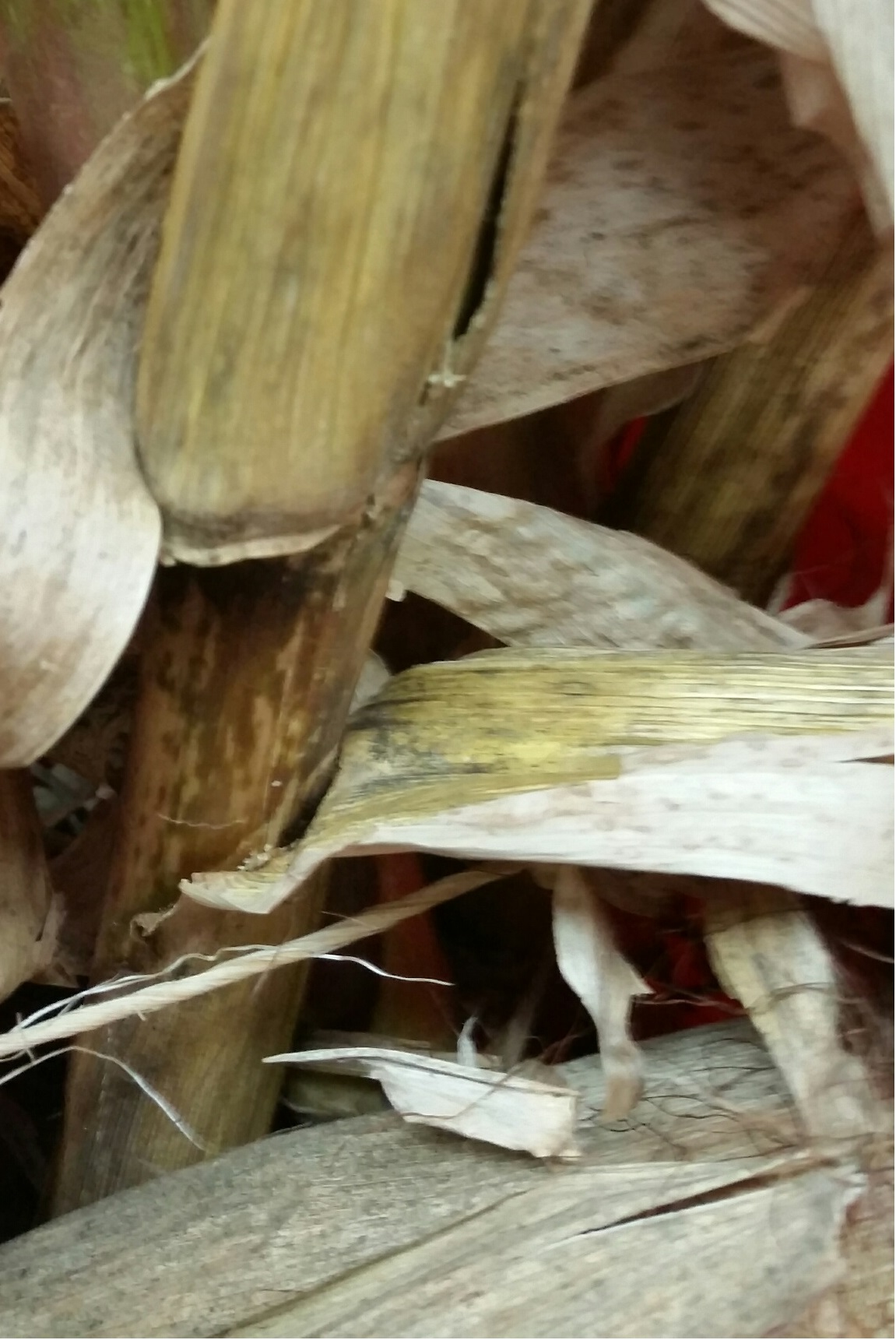
Anthracnose stalk rot

Symptoms can vary depending on which part of the growing season the corn is in.

Early in the growing season, the main symptom is foliar leaf blight. This often appears as 1 inch (25 mm) long and 1/2 inch (13 mm) wide oval or spindle-shaped water-soaked lesions on the lower leaves of the plant. This tissue can become necrotic and has the potential to spread throughout the entire leaf, causing it to yellow and die. They are light brown in color, with margins that appear dark brown or purple. If this persists, black fruiting bodies will appear in the center of the lesion.

The mid-season symptoms appear several weeks after corn produces tassels, when there will be a top die-back if the infection has spread throughout many parts of the plant. In this dieback, the entire plant will become necrotic and die, beginning at the tassel and working its way down the entire stalk to the lowest leaves.

Late in the growing season, another major symptom of this disease appears: stalk rot. It can first be seen as a reflective black stripe on the internodes of the stalk, and can make the stalk soft, causing the plants to easily lodge in heavy precipitation or a wind event.

== Morphology ==
=== Stromata ===
- 70-300 μm in diameter
- Bear prominent, dark, septate spines (setae) up to 100 μm long.

=== Conidia ===
- Developing at the base of the spines
- Hyaline to pale yellow, unicellular, sickle-shaped, falcate to fusiform, tapered toward both ends
- 3-5 x 19-29 μm.

=== Phialides ===
- Unicellular, hylanine and cylindrical,
- 4-8 x 8-20 μm.

=== Growth on PDA ===
Growth on potato dextrose agar is:

- Gray and feltlike
- Conidia and appressoria are numerous when culture are well aerated, and sclerotia sometimes occur.
- Appressoria are diagnostic: they are tawny brown, irregular-shaped in edge, prominent, and terminal on thickened hyphae.

== Disease cycle ==
In the spring, fruiting structures (acervuli) form from corn residue and produce banana-shaped spores (conidia) that are dispersed by wind blown raindrops and splashing. Conidial spores infect young plants through the epidermis or stomata. Anthracnose develops rapidly in cloudy, overcast conditions with high temperatures and humidity. In optimal environmental conditions, conidia can germinate in as little as 6–8 hours in 100% humidity. Initial necrotic spots or lesions can be seen within 72 hours after infection by conidia. Lower leaves that develop lesions provide conidial spores and cause secondary infections on the upper leaves and stalk. Vascular infections primarily occur from wounds caused by stalk-boring insects, such as the larvae of the European corn borer, allowing for conidia to infect and colonize the xylem. From this, anthracnose top die back (vascular wilt) or stalk rot can occur. In the fall, C. graminicola survives as a saprophyte on corn leaf residue. The pathogen can also overwinter on corn stalks as conidia in an extracellular secretion. The secretion prevents conidia from desiccating and protects them from unfavorable environmental conditions. Overwintering on corn residue serves as a vital source of primary inoculum for the leaf blight phase in the spring. The cycle will start all over again when susceptible corn seedlings emerge from the ground in the spring.

== Environment ==
There are several conditions that favor the infection and persistence of anthracnose leaf blight. When high temperatures and long periods of wet weather or high humidity occur, these are the most ideal conditions for its spread and survival. A specific temperature range is required in order for the pathogen to successfully infect the host plant, between 25 and 30 °C (77 and 86 °F). Two other things, those being prolonged periods of low sunlight due to overcast conditions, or an already weakened host due to the infection of other diseases or pests will also favor infection of the host plant. In addition to this, there are two cultural practices that will also favor the disease. Continuous plantings of the same host without introducing crop rotation and no-till fields will favor persistence of the pathogen between growing seasons.

== Disease management ==
Since C. graminicola is found to survive on corn residue, specifically on the soil surface, one of the most effective methods of control is a one-year minimum of crop rotation to reduce anthracnose leaf blight. A study in 2009 showed more severe symptoms of leaf blight due to C. graminicola when grown on fields previously used for corn in comparison to fields previously used for soybean. There are cultural practices that can be taken to disrupt the primary inoculum phase and conidial spore infection of the host plant, and these include using hybrid cultivars resistant to the pathogen and keeping the host plants healthy and controlling other pests to keep them resilient to infection. While there are hybrids resistant to the leaf blight, these same hybrids are often not resistant to the stalk rot that occurs later in the growing season. There is also a cultural practice that disrupts the saprophytic stage of the pathogen, and this involves plowing the leftover corn residue deep into the soil and then using a one-year crop rotation away from the same host plant that was just used in that field. These methods move the saprophytic stage into the soil, where it is out-competed by other organisms, and does not survive. Biological control may also be possible, though the large-scale implementation of this method has not been studied. This is done by applying yeasts to the leaf surfaces that are showing symptoms of the leaf blight.

== Importance ==
Corn anthracnose caused by C. graminicola is a disease present worldwide. This disease can affect all parts of the plant and can develop at any time during the growing season. This disease is typically seen in leaf blight or stalk rot form. Before the 1970s, Anthracnose was not an issue in North America. In the early 1970s, north-central and eastern U.S was hit with severe epidemics. Within 2 years of C. graminicola's appearance in Western-Indiana, sweet corn production for canning companies were nearly wiped out and production no longer exists there today.

Anthracnose stalk rot was seen in many U.S corn fields in the 1980s and 1990s. A survey conducted in Illinois in 1982 and 1983 found that 34 to 46% of rotted corn stalks contained C. graminicola. Estimates on yield grain losses from anthracnose leaf blight and stalk rot range from zero to over 40%. This is dependent on hybrid, environment, timing of infection, and other stresses.

== Pathogenesis ==
Once conidia germinate on corn leaves, a germ tube differentiates and develops into an appresoria and allows C. graminicola to penetrate epidermal cells. Germination and appressorium formation occur best in the temperature range 15–30 °C (59–86 °F)) Penetration occurs in a much narrower temperature range 25–30 °C (77–86 °F). In order to penetrate the cell wall, the fungus first pumps melanin into the walls of the appressorium to create turgor pressure in the appressorium. The melanin allows water into the appressorium cell but nothing out. This builds up an incredible amount of turgor pressure which the fungus then uses to push a hyphae through the corn cell wall. This is called the penetration peg. The penetration peg then grows, extends through the cell extracting nutrients and the host cell wall dies. Hyphae migrate from epidermal cells to mesophyll cells. As a defense response, the cells produce papillae to prevent cell entry but is typically not seen successful. It is believed C. graminicola has a biotrophic phase because the plasma membrane of the epidermal cells is not immediately penetrated after invasion into the epidermal cell wall. Between 48–72 hours after infection, C. graminicola shifted from biotrophic growth to nectrotrophy (lesions appear). This is when secondary hyphae invade cell walls and intercellular spaces.
