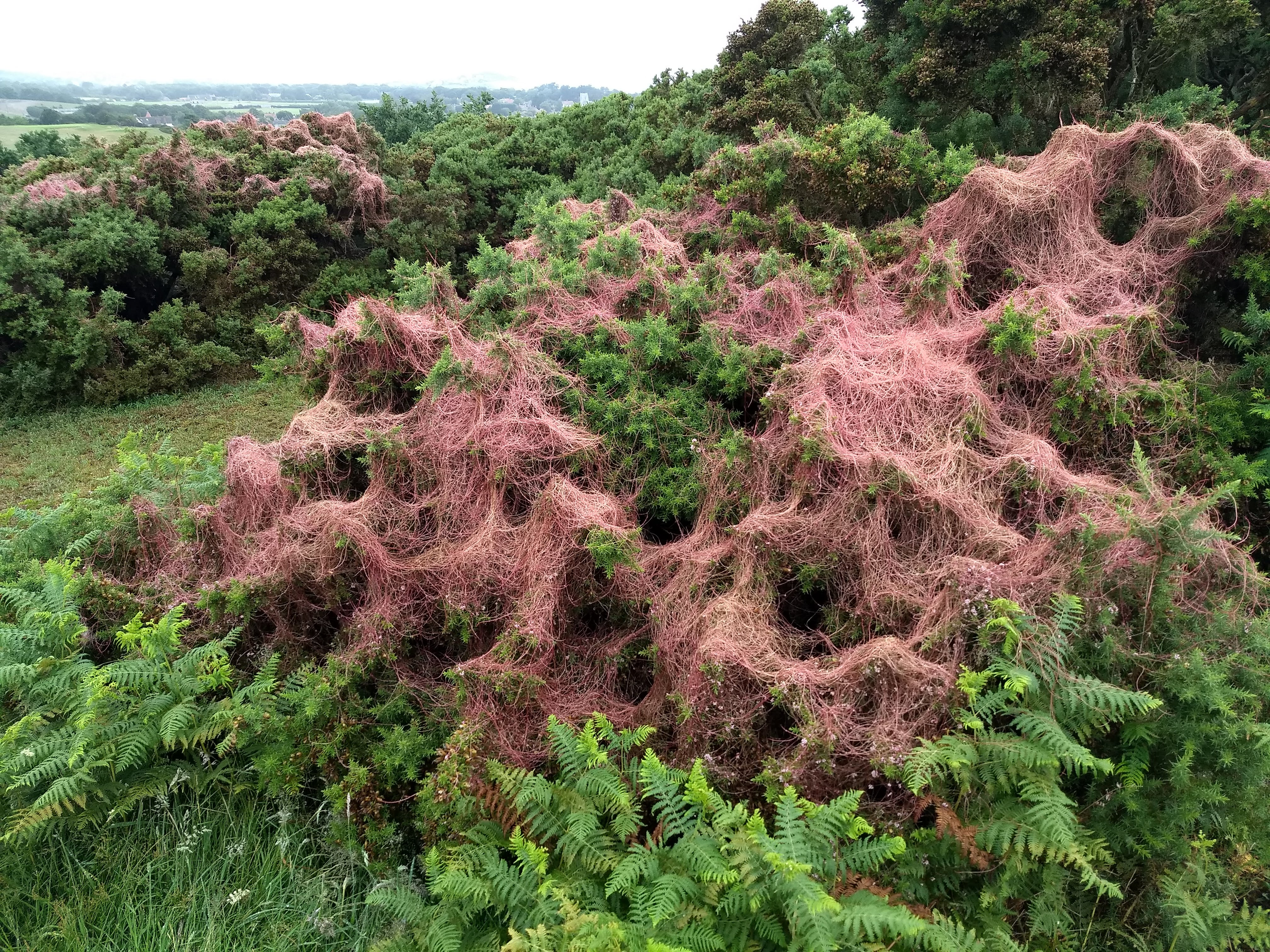
- Dodder parasitizing gorse (Ulex europaeus)

Scientific classification
- Kingdom: Plantae
- Clade: Tracheophytes
- Clade: Angiosperms
- Clade: Eudicots
- Clade: Asterids
- Order: Solanales
- Family: Convolvulaceae
- Genus: Cuscuta
- Species: C. epithymum

Binomial name
- Cuscuta epithymum (L.) L.

Synonyms
- Lepimenes epithymum (L.) Raf. Cuscuta europaea var. epithymum L.

= Cuscuta epithymum =

Species of flowering plant

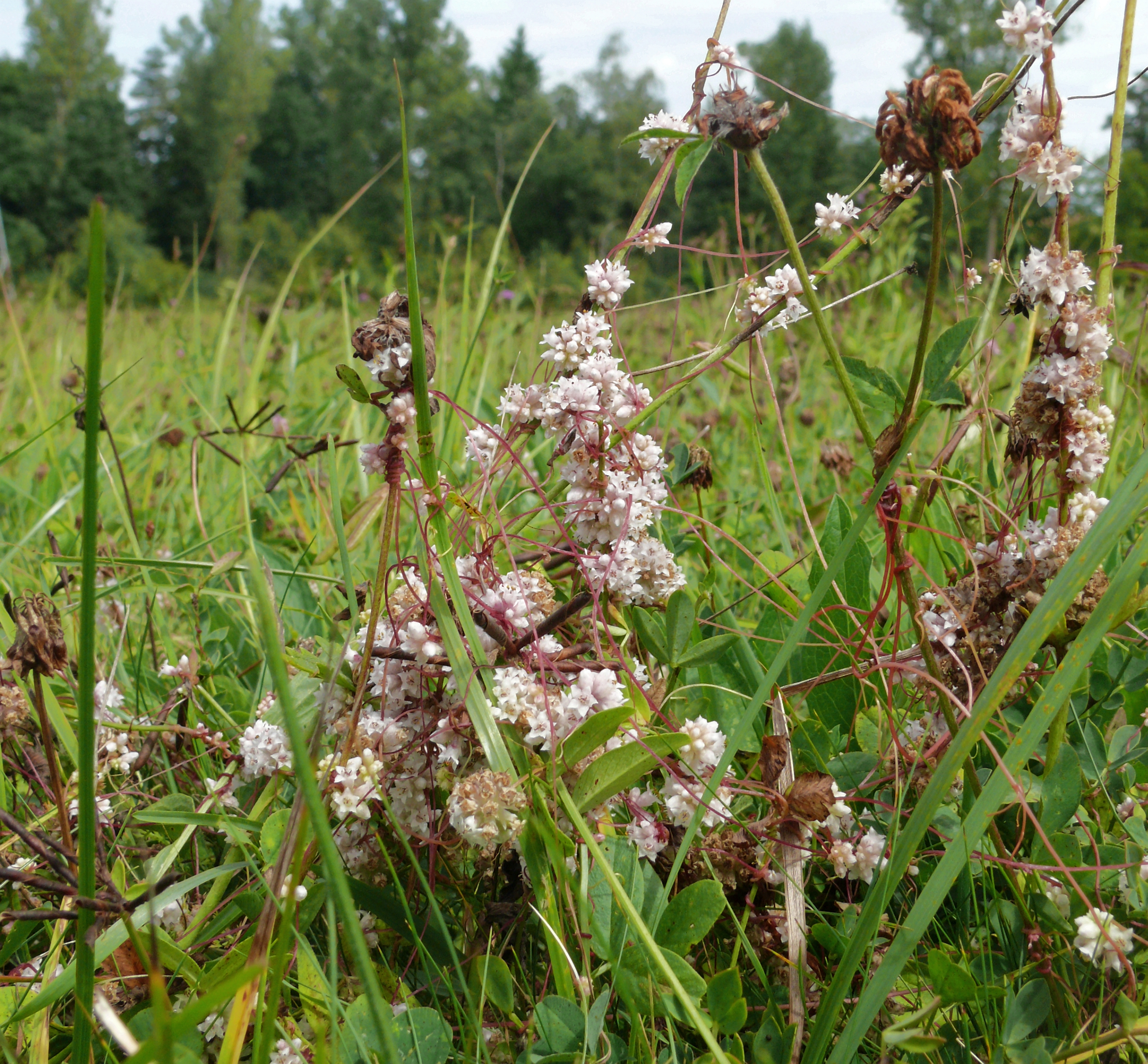
Flowers of C. epithymum

Cuscuta epithymum (dodder, lesser dodder, hellweed, strangle-tare) is a parasitic plant assigned to the family Cuscutaceae or Convolvulaceae, depending on the taxonomy. It is red-pigmented, not being photosynthetically active. It has a filiform habit, like a group of yarns. Its leaves are very small, like flakes. Its flowers, disposed in little glomerules, have a white corolla, with the androecium welded to the corolla.

In Eurasia, this species of dodder would often attach itself to the Conehead thyme (Thymus capitatus), taking on the plant's pungency. This gave rise to its specific name, which means upon thyme and from whence it also derived its host's Arabic name, al-ṣaʿitrah.

== Description ==
C. epithymum is a rootless holoparasitic plant. It has thin (0.25–0.40 mm) hairless filiform (thread-like) stems that are pink, red, yellow or purple. Its leaves are very small and scale-like on the stems. It attaches to the host plant via haustoria. The flowers are white or pink in groups of 7–25, growing directly on the stems. The flowers have five petals and sepals. The petals are joined together forming a cup-like corolla, which is longer than the sepals. The flowers are replaced by small round fruits topped with withered petals. The fruits contain up to four seeds, each about 1 mm long.

Six different varieties of C. epithymum have been described, based on the number, grouping and structure of the flowers.

== Distribution ==
As a native species C. epithymum occurs from Macaronesia in the west throughout most of Europe to as far east as Xinjiang in Northwest China. It is also present in parts of western North Africa.

=== Invasive species ===
C. epithymum has been unintentionally introduced into North and South America, Southern Africa, Australia, New Zealand and Primorsky Krai (southeastern Russia). Such introductions probably occurred from the import of contaminated seed from crops that it parasitizes, such as alfalfa.

== Host species ==
C. epithymum parasitizes a wide range of plant species. In Hungary alone it has 391 different host species, 191 of which it was the only Cuscuta species to parasitize. The commonest (>20% affected) host plants are Achillea millefolium (Yarrow), Galium verum (Lady's bedstraw), Arrhenatherum elatius (False oat grass), Plantago lanceolata (Ribwort plantain), Lotus corniculatus (Bird's foot trefoil), Sanguisorba minor (Salad burnet), Festuca rupicola (Furrowed fescue), Teucrium chamaedrys (Wall germander), Daucus carota (Wild carrot) and Convolvulus arvensis (Field bindweed). In northwestern Europe the main host species are dry heathland species such as Ulex europaeus (Gorse), Clover and Calluna vulgaris (Common heather). In Spain it parasitizes Hormathophylla spinosa (Spiny madwort).

== Life cycle ==
C. epithymum is generally regarded as annual and grows from seeds that germinate when conditions are right. The seeds have evidence of both physiological and physical dormancy, allowing them to survive in the soil for several years. Shoots must find a host plant quickly as the seed contains only minimal nutrition. Once the shoot has found a host plant it quickly climbs over it, twisting in a counter-clockwise fashion around the host stems. It then tightens and sends out haustoria that penetrate through the epidermis into the underlying xylem, allowing the parasite to draw both water and nutrients from the host. The stems of the parasite are tightly coiled around the host while other stems remain loosely coiled, allowing them to seek out other parts of the host or a new host. The plant flowers and is either pollinated by insects or, if necessary, is self-pollinated. The seeds are dispersed on the ground beneath the host to await future germination. On some perennial hosts it forms small galls, where parasitic tissue can survive the winter, from which new shoots can grow the following spring.

== Medicinal use ==
This dodder species is widely used in traditional medicine to treat a large variety of ailments. It has been used as a purgative and to treat insanity, depression, leprosy, diabetes, jaundice, liver disorders, spleen disorders, urinary tract disorders, vision problems, syphilis and rheumatism. There are indications of hepatotoxicity when used in high doses over long periods.

== Impact on agriculture ==
Due to the wide range of hosts, its ability of its seeds to lie dormant for long periods and the damage caused to the host plants, C. epithymum is of major economic concern in agriculture, both within its native range and in many places where it has been introduced. In some cases infestation can lead to total loss of the crop. In Romania, all leguminous fodder crops are attacked by this dodder. It is also known to be involved in the transmission of plant viruses to crops, including sugar beet and potato.

Control of this parasite is by a mixture of prevention, such as the removal of dodder seeds from the crop seeds, mechanical control, such as by shallow tillage and biological control, using fungi such as Colletotrichum destructivum.
