= Colletotrichum nigrum =

Scientific classification
- Kingdom: Fungi
- Division: Ascomycota
- Class: Sordariomycetes
- Order: Glomerellales
- Family: Glomerellaceae
- Genus: Colletotrichum
- Species: C. nigrum

Binomial name
- Colletotrichum nigrum Ellis & Halst., (1890)

Species of fungus

Colletotrichum nigrum is a fungal plant pathogen. It causes anthracnose fruit rot in tomatoes.
