= C. nigrum =

C. nigrum may refer to:

- Centroscyllium nigrum, the combtooth dogfish, a little-known deepwater dogfish shark species
- Colletotrichum nigrum, a plant pathogen species
- Coluber nigrum, a synonym for Causus rhombeatus, a venomous viper species found in subsaharan Africa

== See also ==
- List of Latin and Greek words commonly used in systematic names#N
