= Pecan anthracnose =

Fungal disease of pecan trees

Pecan antharacnose
- Causal agents: Glomerella cingulata
- Hosts: Pecan trees
- EPPO Code: GLOMCI

Pecan anthracnose is a fungal disease of pecan trees caused by the ascomycete Glomerella cingulata (Stoneman) Spauld. & H. It is a widespread disease found wherever pecan trees are grown. Pecan anthracnose has been reported as far back in time as 1914 (Rand 1914), and as far away as Argentina (Mantz, Minhot et al. 2010). Glomerella cingulata has two anamorphs which cause disease on pecan trees, Colletotrichum gloeosporioides and Colletotrichum acutatum (Latham 1995). The occurrence of Colletotrichum on pecans has contributed to a significant decline in pecan production in various years. An increase in the incidence of pecan anthracnose is highly correlated with heavy rainfall, especially heavy rainfall occurring in early spring. The severity of symptoms increases as the season progresses, often culminating in leaf drop in the late autumn. This defoliation is linked to lower yield and poorer quality of nuts (Brenneman 2010).

== Overview of disease ==
Pecan anthracnose is caused by the fungus Glomerella cingulata and is a disease of pecan trees that causes significant losses of yields as it attacks the nut itself. Pecan anthracnose is favored by wet environmental conditions and warm temperatures above 80 degrees Fahrenheit. Symptoms include dark lesions on the pecan shuck and leaves. The lesions can grow over the entire plant. Signs include pink spores inside of the lesions. If left untreated, symptoms will get progressively worse throughout the season, progressively reducing yield. Pecans are primarily grown in the southern part of the United States, so these warm, wet areas are most susceptible to pecan anthracnose. Pecan anthracnose can occasionally cause zinc deficiencies in the trees it infects; of the cultivars of pecans that are susceptible, Witchita, Kiowa, Gloria Grande, Pawnee and Mohawk are most prone to zinc deficiencies. Pecan anthracnose can significantly cost farmers; the disease causes infected trees to produce less nuts and or drop them too early. Additionally, like mentioned above, the lesions of the disease can grow to cover the entirety of a fruit, making the pecan crop unsellable and unconsumable. It is estimated that pecan anthracnose cost Georgia farmers 3.4 million dollars in 2009.

== Prevention and control ==
For pecan anthracnose, it is best to use a similar control method to that used against pecan scab. Both pecan scab and anthracnose are best controlled by making sure the plants get plenty of airflow to keep their environment dry (one way to do this is by making sure the plants are not crowded together). Additionally, it is important to remove the dead leaves, nuts, etc. from the past season because the pathogen can overwinter in these structures and strike again the following year). Another form of control involves spraying fungicide 7–12 times throughout the season, beginning in the spring. As a preventative measure it is important to spray fungicide as soon as the bud breaks. Spraying fungicide also helps to ward off powdery mildew and pecan scab. In 2012, it was found that compounds created from Lactobacillus plantarum had important antifungal properties that could be used to treat pecan anthracnose caused by Glomerella cingulate. As far as prevention goes, there are some varieties of pecan plants that are resistant to anthracnose and pruning out and destroying diseased plants can help to stop the spread of the disease.

== Life cycle ==
Pecan anthracnose is an ascomycete fungus and has a life cycle similar to that of other ascomycetes. Anthracnose has an overwintering stage and survives as an ascocarp. The ascocarp can survive on fallen nuts, leaves and other plant debris. Ascocarps can be spread by the wind or rain. Then, during a rainy, warm spring or summer, the ascocarp releases its ascospores and they go off and infect new plants to create more ascocarps which in turn make more ascospores and the life cycle begins again. Anthracnose is polycyclic, so it has a sexual stage as conidia when it finds its mating type.

== Economic consequences ==
The financial loss due to pecan anthracnose in 2009 in Georgia was estimated at US$3.4 million (Brock 2010). However, the actual loss due to the disease is difficult to quantify. Due to the nature of carbohydrate storage in perennials, the damage to pecan production is also likely to present itself in a lower yield in the year directly following a disease outbreak (Worley 1979).

== Progression of disease ==
Pecan anthracnose is reported to have an unusually long latent period; it can take weeks to months from the time of initial infection to symptom development. Both ascospores and conidia can be found in the field and in culture, and both of these spore types can cause infection (Rand 1914).

== Symptoms ==
Pink conidial oozes can be observed emerging from acervuli with setae on leaves and shucks.
