= Hemibiotrophs =

Hemibiotrophs are the spectrum of plant pathogens, including bacteria, oomycete and a group of plant pathogenic fungi that keep its host alive while establishing itself within the host tissue, taking up the nutrients with brief biotrophic-like phase. It then, in later stages of infection switches to a necrotrophic life-style, where it rampantly kills the host cells, deriving its nutrients from the dead tissues.

This mode of interaction, in which initial biotrophy followed by a switch to necrotrophy, has been observed in the fungal model Magnaporthe oryzae (rice blast fungus) and other pathogens such as many Colletotrichum spp. (often called anthracnose diseases, e.g. Colletotrichum lindemuthianum), Southern corn leaf blight (Bipolaris maydis) and, Zymoseptoria tritici (syn. Mycosphaerella graminicola, leaf blotch of wheat). Collectively, they represent some of the most destructive plant parasites, causing huge economic losses, threatening global food security.

A spectrum of hemibiotrophic plant pathogens, including the bacterium Pseudomonas syringae and the oomycete Phytophthora infestans (potato blight), also exhibit characteristics of both biotrophs and necrotrophs and thus are called hemibiotrophs, depending on the stages of their life cycle.

== Life style ==
In contrast to biotrophs, hemibiotrophs have dual life-styles. The initial biotrophic life-style of hemibiotrophs causes minimum damage to the plant tissues, while the fungus obtains nutrients from living plant tissues Hemibiotrophic fungi require living plant tissue to survive to complete their life cycle.

Most fungal hemibiotrophs develop haustoria, whereas some produce intracellular hyphae to acquire nutrients from the host cytoplasm. However, in the hemibiotrophic life-style the pathogen later breaks down host cell walls through secretion of hydrolytic enzymes and feeds on the released nutrients. These hydrolytic enzymes and toxins are synthesized during the later necrotrophic phase. They also produce extracellular hyphae between the host cells to facilitate nutrient assimilation. Plant pathogenic fungi produce and secrete many so‐called effector proteins that interact with the host and play an important role in virulence.

The rice blast fungus Magnaporthe oryzae and Colletotrichum species are generally considered to be hemibiotrophs. Three hemibiotrophic species, Colletotrichum pisicola, C. vignae and C. destructivum belong to the Colletotrichum destructivum complex. Fusarium oxysporum is the cause of fusarium wilt disease and Moniliophthora roreri, which causes frosty pod rot disease of cacao, are hemibiotrophs that affect many agricultural and floricultural crops worldwide

In the early stages of infection, the pathogens proliferate asymptomatically in the host by suppressing programmed cell death (PCD) or thwarting host defense responses, but in the later stages of infection they undergo a physiological transition from asymptomatic biotrophic growth to a highly destructive necrotrophic phase. Hemibiotrophic bacteria are known to secrete a range of so-called effector proteins, including transcription factors and others with enzymatic activities, into host cells via the type III secretion system (T3SS) whereupon they suppress PCD and other host defenses.

== Hemibiotrophy genes ==
Studies indicate that fungal hemibiotrophic C. lindemuthianum species undergo two distinct phases during host invasion. Initially, the biotrophic phase involves generating intracellular hyphae within intact plant cells. Subsequently, the necrotrophic phase occurs where extracellular hyphae penetrate cellular boundaries, traversing plasmodesmata and spreading between host cells.

The suggestion that these fungi undergo a distinct metabolic switch from biotrophic to necrotrophic growth was boosted by the discovery of a gene that functions between the biotrophic and necrotrophic phases. The gene CLTA1 encodes a GAL4‐like transcriptional activator, which is consistent with a role in reprogramming metabolism. It is clear that all pathogens are obliged to alter metabolic fluxes in numerous ways upon penetration to prepare for proliferation. This is a key postulated attribute of the hemibiotrophs and seems to be a priority subject for study.

== Life cycle of hemibiotrophs ==
The hemibiotrophic life cycle involves an initial biotrophic phase and later a necrotrophic phase. Colletotrichum lindemuthianum is a hemibiotrophic fungus on beans (common bean anthracnose). Conidia then, on the host surface, germinate and differentiate to form a melanized infection structure devoted to mechanical penetration of the epidermal cells. After the penetration step, the infection cycle is characterized by two successive phases. In the first phase, lasting 3 to 4 days, the fungus grows biotrophically inside the infected epidermal cells. During this phase, referred to as the biotrophic phase, the appressoria develops into a primary penetration hypha, which is surrounded by the invaginated plant plasma membrane, during this phase the penetrated host cell remains alive with minimum damage. The second phase, which corresponds to the appearance of symptoms, is completed 6 to 8 days after inoculation. During this phase, the necrotrophic phase, the fungus develops secondary hyphae that grow both intracellularly and intercellularly and thus acts as a typical necrotrophic pathogen. During the necrotrophic phase the fungus secretes cell wall-degrading enzymes that break down the host cell wall. After a few days the plant cell membrane disintegrates and ultimately the host cell dies. Thereafter the fungus grows as a necrotroph.

Another hemibiotroph is Moniliophthora roreri, which causes frosty pod rot on Theobroma sp. (Cacao). It produces meiospores, via meiosis, from the modified basidium. These spores are important as dispersal agents, for infection and survival. Meiospores germinate and produce hyphae made up of haploid cells throughout the biotrophic phase. The necrotrophic phase is thought to start from the formation of dikaryotic hyphae and continues until sporulation on the pod surface.
