= Conidial anastomosis tubes =

Cells found in some fungi

Conidial anastomosis tubes (CATs) are cells formed from the conidia (a type of fungal asexual spores) of many filamentous fungi. These cells have a tubular shape and form an anastomosis (bridge) that allows fusion between conidia.

CATs and germ tubes (germination tubes) are some of the specialized hyphae (long cells formed by filamentous fungal species) that are formed by fungal conidia. CATs are morphologically and physiologically distinct from germ tubes and are under separate genetic control.

Germ tubes, produced during conidial germination, are different from CATs because: CATs are thinner, shorter, lack branches, exhibit determinate growth, and home toward each other.

CAT biology is not completely understood. Initially, conidia are induced to form CATs. Once they are formed, they grow homing toward each other, and eventually they fuse. Once fusion occurs, the respective nuclei can pass through the fused CATs from one conidium to the other. These are events of fungal vegetative growth (asexual reproduction) and not sexual reproduction. Part of the CAT fusion (cell fusion) has been shown to be a coordinated behaviour.

The filamentous fungus Neurospora crassa (a bread mould and fungal model organism) produces CATs from conidia and conidial germ tubes. In contrast, the fungal plant pathogen, Colletotrichum lindemuthianum, only produces CATs from conidia and not from germ tubes.

Fusion between these cells seems to be important for some fungi during early stages of colony establishment. The production of these cells has been suggested to occur in 73 different species of fungi.
