= Colletotrichum destructivum =

Scientific classification
- Domain: Eukaryota
- Kingdom: Fungi
- Division: Ascomycota
- Class: Sordariomycetes
- Order: Glomerellales
- Family: Glomerellaceae
- Genus: Colletotrichum
- Species: C. destructivum

Binomial name
- Colletotrichum destructivum O'Gara, (1915)

Synonyms
- Colletotrichum sativum N.L. Horn, (1952)

Fungal plant pathogen

Colletotrichum destructivum is a plant pathogen.
