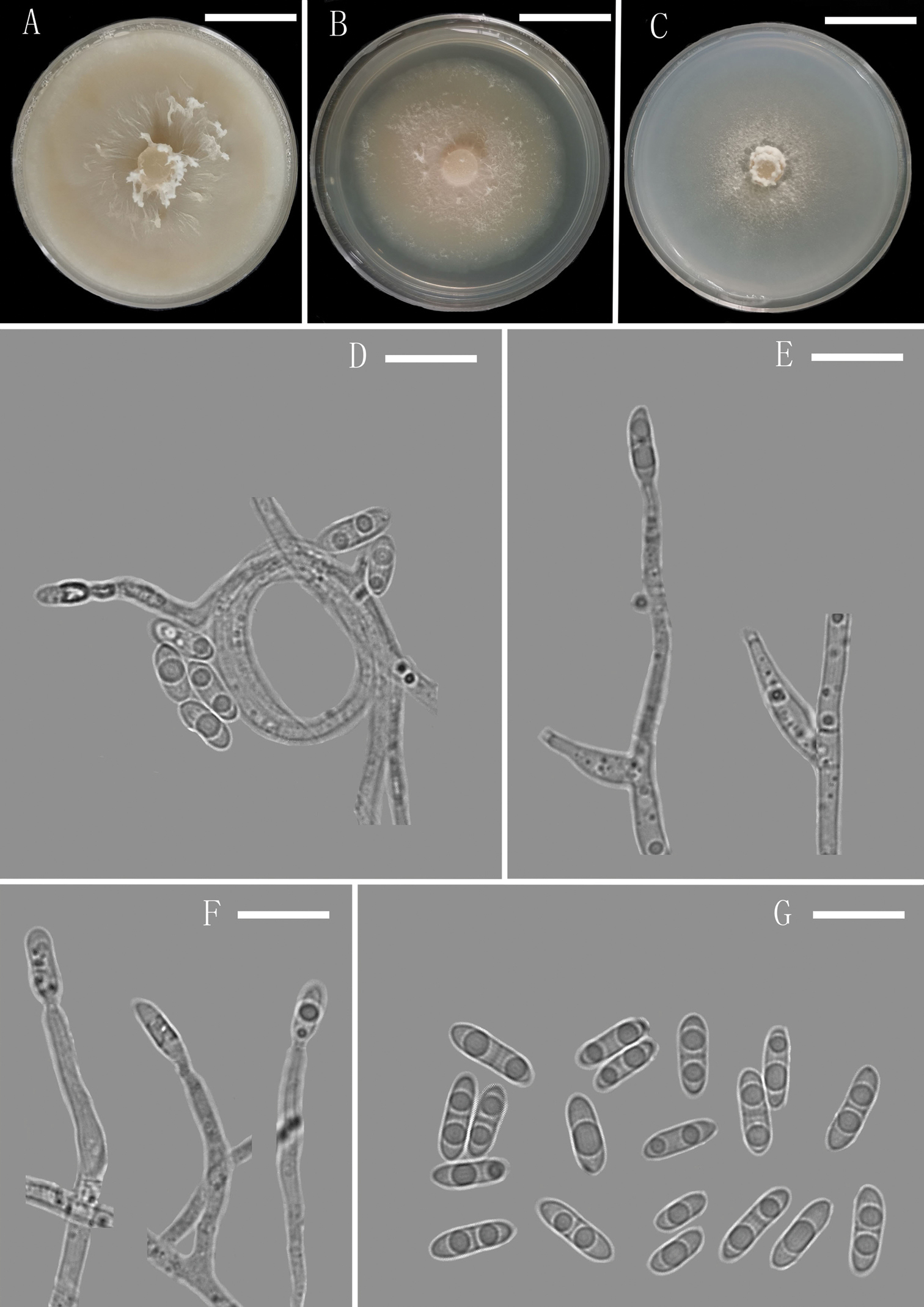
- Plectosphaerella cucumerina

Scientific classification
- Kingdom: Fungi
- Division: Ascomycota
- Class: Sordariomycetes
- Family: incertae sedis
- Genus: Plectosphaerella; Kleb.

= Plectosphaerella =

Genus of fungi

Plectosphaerella is a genus of mostly pathogenic fungi within the class Sordariomycetes. The relationship of this taxon to other taxa within the class is unknown (incertae sedis). The type species is Plectosphaerella cucumerina.
