= Somatic hyphae =

The life stage at which a fungus lives, grows, and develops, gathering nutrients and energy.

The fungus uses this stage to proliferate itself through asexually created mitotic spores.

Cycles through somatic hyphae, zoosporangia, zoospores, encystation & germination, and back to somatic hyphae.
