= Germ tube =

Fungal structure produced during germination

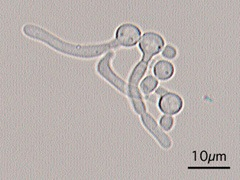
Germ tubes of Candida albicans

A germ tube is an outgrowth produced by spores of spore-releasing fungi during germination.

The germ tube differentiates, grows, and develops by mitosis to create somatic hyphae.

A germ tube test is a diagnostic test in which a sample of fungal spores are suspended in animal serum and examined by microscopy for the detection of any germ tubes. It is particularly indicated for colonies of white or cream color on fungal culture, where a positive germ tube test is strongly indicative of Candida albicans.

== See also ==
- Oomycota
