= Appressorium =

Structure produced by some fungi

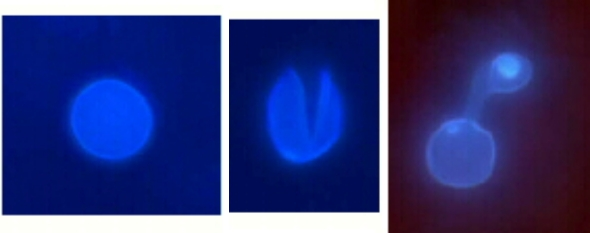
Germinating conidiospores of Hyaloperonospora parasitica. Observe the appressorium on top right.

An appressorium is a specialized cell typical of many fungal plant pathogens that is used to infect host plants. It is a flattened, hyphal "pressing" organ, from which a minute infection peg grows and enters the host, using turgor pressure of 8.0 MPa (80 bars), capable of punching through even Mylar.

Following spore attachment and germination on the host surface, the emerging germ tube perceives physical cues such as surface hardness and hydrophobicity, as well as chemical signals including wax monomers that trigger appressorium formation. Appressorium formation begins when the tip of the germ tube ceases polar growth, hooks, and begins to swell. The contents of the spore are then mobilized into the developing appressorium, a septum develops at the neck of the appressorium, and the germ tube and spore collapse and die. As the appressorium matures, it becomes firmly attached to the plant surface and a dense layer of melanin is laid down in the appressorium wall, except across a pore at the plant interface. Turgor pressure increases inside the appressorium and a penetration hypha emerges at the pore, which is driven through the plant cuticle into the underlying epidermal cells. The osmotic pressure exerted by the appressorium can reach up to 8 MPa (80 bars), which allows it to puncture the plant cuticle. This pressure is achievable due to a melanin-pigmented cell wall which is impermeable to compounds larger than water molecules, so the highly-concentrated ions cannot escape from it.

== Formation ==
The attachment of a fungal spore on the surface of the host plant is the first critical step of infection. Once the spore is hydrated, an adhesive mucilage is released from its tip. During germination, mucilaginous substances continue to be extruded at the tips of the germ tube, which are essential for germ tube attachment and appressorium formation. Spore adhesion and appressorium formation is inhibited by hydrolytic enzymes such as α-mannosidase, α-glucosidase, and protease, suggesting that the adhesive materials are composed of glycoproteins. Germination is also inhibited at high spore concentrations, which might be due to a lipophilic self inhibitor. Self inhibition can be overcome by hydrophobic wax from rice leaf.

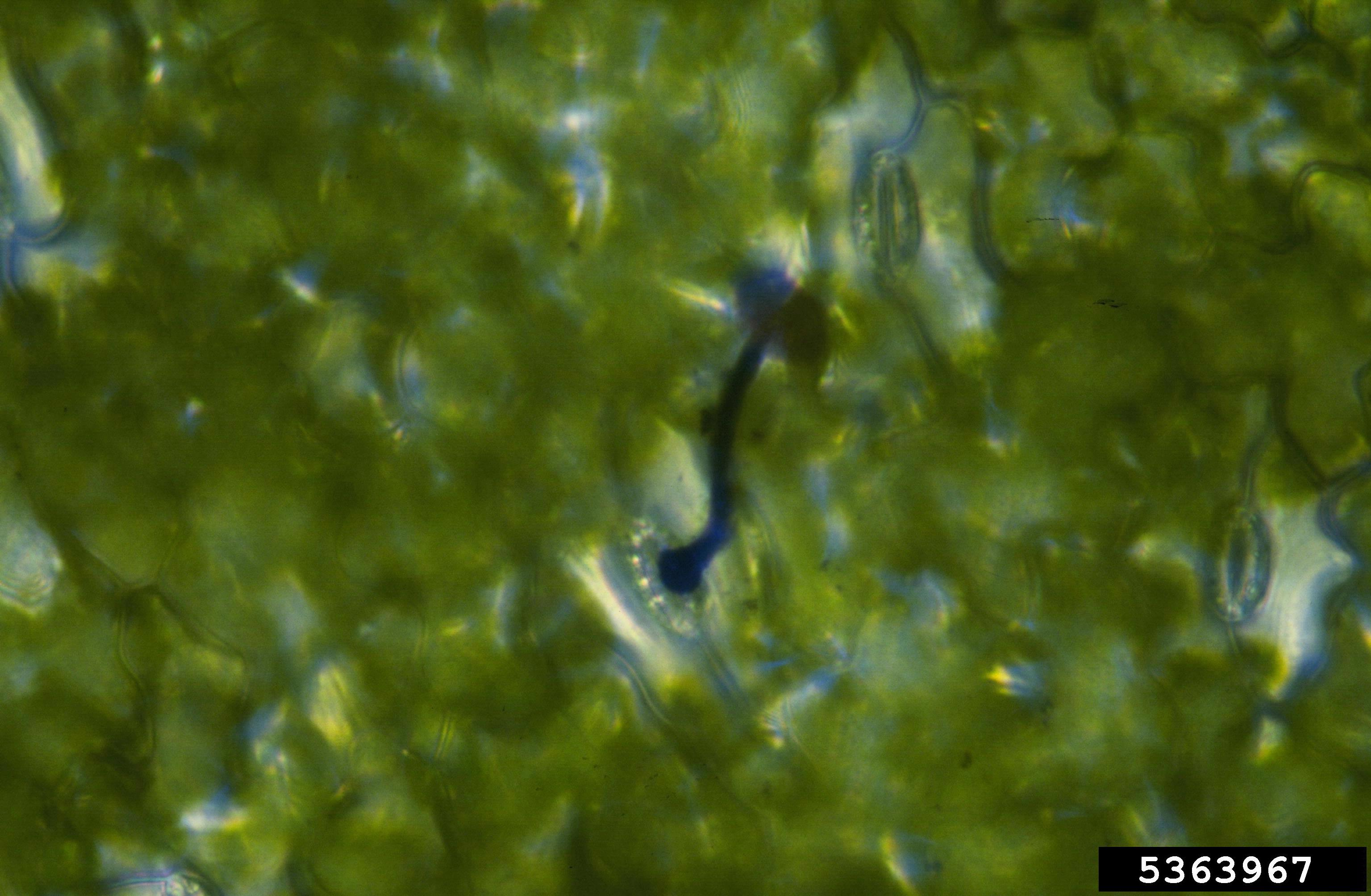
Uromyces appendiculatus, germ tube and appressorium

In response to surface signals, the germ tube tip undergoes a cell differentiation process to form a specialized infection structure, the appressorium. Frank B. (1883), in 'Ueber einige neue und weniger bekannte Pflanzenkrankheiten', coined the name "appressorium" for the adhesion body formed by the bean pathogen Gloeosporium lindemuthianum on the host surface.

Appressorium development involves a number of steps: nuclear division, first septum formation, germling emergence, tip swelling and second septum formation. Mitosis first occurs soon after surface attachment, and a nucleus from the second round of mitosis during tip swelling migrates into the hooked cell before septum formation. A mature appressorium normally contains a single nucleus. The outside plasma membrane of the mature appressorium is covered by a melanin layer except at the region in contact with the substratum, where the penetration peg, a specialized hypha that penetrates the tissue surface, develops. Cellular glycerol concentration sharply increases during spore germination, but it rapidly decreases at the point of appressorium initiation, and then gradually increases again during appressorium maturation. This glycerol accumulation generates high turgor pressure in the appressorium, and melanin is necessary for maintaining the glycerol gradient across the appressorium cell wall.

== Initiation ==
Appressoria are induced in response to physical cues including surface hardness and hydrophobicity, as well as chemical signals of aldehydes exogenous cAMP, ethylene, the host's ripening hormone and the plant cutin monomer hexadecanoic acid. Long chain fatty acids and the tripeptide sequence Arg-Gly-Asp inhibit appressorium induction.

Rust fungi only form appressoria at stomata, since they can only infect plants through these pores. Other fungi tend to form appressoria over anticlinal cell walls, and some form them at any location.

== See also ==
- Haustorium
