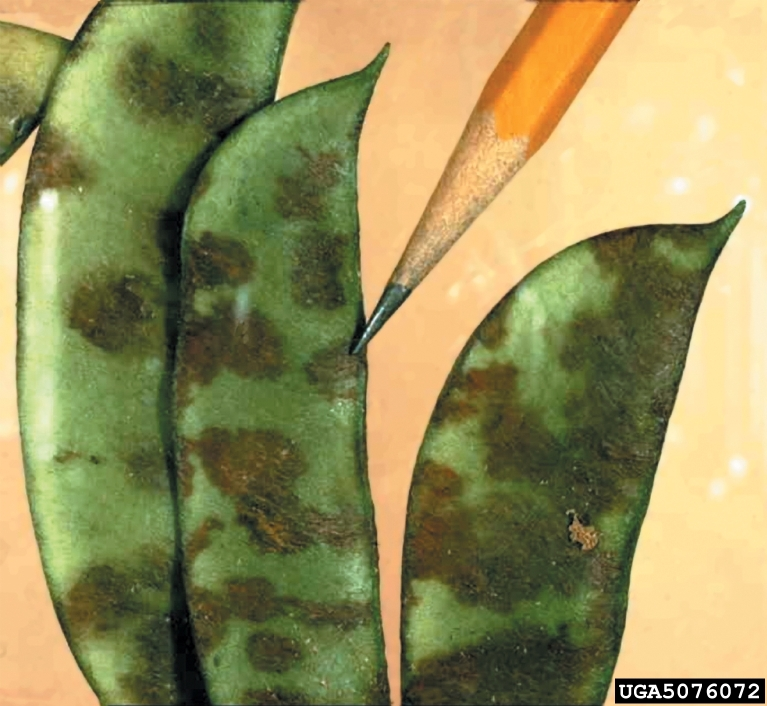
- C. lindemuthianum on bean pods

Scientific classification
- Kingdom: Fungi
- Division: Ascomycota
- Class: Sordariomycetes
- Order: Glomerellales
- Family: Glomerellaceae
- Genus: Colletotrichum; Corda, 1831

Species complexes
- See text

= Colletotrichum =

Genus of fungi

Colletotrichum (sexual stage: Glomerella) is a genus of fungi that are symbionts to plants as endophytes (living within the plant) or phytopathogens. Many of the species in this genus are plant pathogens, but some species may have a mutualistic relationship with hosts.

== History ==
The history of the Colletotrichum genus is a case study on the tension between the lumpers and splitters. While the genus Colletotrichum was first proposed in 1831, the exact definition of Colletotrichum and the species that belong in this genus has been in flux ever since. The biggest recent shift has been from a definition (of both the genus and the species within it) based on morphology to a definition based on a combination of morphology and molecular phylogenetics. The use of molecular phylogenetics has led to a huge increase in the number of recognized species in this genus, and the species are now organized into species complexes that usually have the name of their most widely known species. The name of a species when referring its namesake species complex will often have the suffix s.l. or sensu lato (in the broad sense) while that same name when referring to the specific species within the species complex will have the suffix of s.s. or sensu stricto (in the strict sense).

The most recent assessment of this genus identifies 248 species, most of which are categorized into 14 species complexes. If history is any indicator of the future, then the list of species complexes and species within this genus will continue to be redefined and reorganized as more information becomes available.

== Species and species complexes ==
=== Colletotrichum acutatum species complex ===
- Colletotrichum abscissum
- Colletotrichum acerbum
- Colletotrichum acutatum sensu stricto
- Colletotrichum arboricola
- Colletotrichum australe
- Colletotrichum brisbanense
- Colletotrichum cairnsense
- Colletotrichum carthami
- Colletotrichum chrysanthemi
- Colletotrichum citri
- Colletotrichum cosmi
- Colletotrichum costaricense
- Colletotrichum cuscutae
- Colletotrichum eriobotryae
- Colletotrichum fioriniae
- Colletotrichum godetiae
- Colletotrichum guajavae
- Colletotrichum indonesiense
- Colletotrichum javanense
- Colletotrichum johnstonii
- Colletotrichum kinghornii
- Colletotrichum laticiphilum
- Colletotrichum lauri
- Colletotrichum limetticola
- Colletotrichum lupini
- Colletotrichum melonis
- Colletotrichum nymphaeae
- Colletotrichum paranaense
- Colletotrichum paxtonii
- Colletotrichum phormii
- Colletotrichum pyricola
- Colletotrichum rhombiforme
- Colletotrichum roseum
- Colletotrichum salicis
- Colletotrichum scovillei
- Colletotrichum simmondsii
- Colletotrichum sloanei
- Colletotrichum tamarilloi
- Colletotrichum walleri
- Colletotrichum wanningense

=== Colletotrichum agaves species complex ===
- Colletotrichum agaves sensu stricto
- Colletotrichum euphorbiae
- Colletotrichum ledebouriae
- Colletotrichum neosansevieriae
- Colletotrichum sansevieriae

=== Colletotrichum boninense species complex ===
- Colletotrichum annellatum
- Colletotrichum beeveri
- Colletotrichum boninense sensu stricto
- Colletotrichum brasiliense
- Colletotrichum brassicicola
- Colletotrichum camelliae-japonicae
- Colletotrichum catinaense
- Colletotrichum citricola
- Colletotrichum colombiense
- Colletotrichum condaoense
- Colletotrichum constrictum
- Colletotrichum cymbidiicola
- Colletotrichum dacrycarpi
- Colletotrichum doitungense
- Colletotrichum feijoicola
- Colletotrichum hippeastri
- Colletotrichum karstii
- Colletotrichum limonicola
- Colletotrichum novae-zelandiae
- Colletotrichum oncidii
- Colletotrichum parsonsiae
- Colletotrichum petchii
- Colletotrichum phyllanthi
- Colletotrichum torulosum
- Colletotrichum watphraense

=== Colletotrichum dematium species complex ===
- Colletotrichum anthrisci
- Colletotrichum circinans
- Colletotrichum dematium sensu stricto
- Colletotrichum eryngiicola
- Colletotrichum fructi
- Colletotrichum hemerocallidis
- Colletotrichum insertae
- Colletotrichum jinshuiense
- Colletotrichum kakivorum
- Colletotrichum lineola
- Colletotrichum menispermi
- Colletotrichum orchidis
- Colletotrichum parthenocissicola
- Colletotrichum sambucicola
- Colletotrichum sedi
- Colletotrichum sonchicola
- Colletotrichum spinaciae

=== Colletotrichum destructivum species complex ===
- Colletotrichum americae-borealis
- Colletotrichum antirrhinicola
- Colletotrichum atractylodicola
- Colletotrichum bryoniicola
- Colletotrichum destructivum sensu stricto
- Colletotrichum fuscum
- Colletotrichum higginsianum
- Colletotrichum lentis
- Colletotrichum lini
- Colletotrichum ocimi
- Colletotrichum panacicola
- Colletotrichum pisicola
- Colletotrichum shisoi
- Colletotrichum tabacum
- Colletotrichum tanaceti
- Colletotrichum utrechtense
- Colletotrichum vignae

=== Colletotrichum dracaenophilum species complex ===
- Colletotrichum cariniferi
- Colletotrichum coelogynes
- Colletotrichum dracaenophilum sensu stricto
- Colletotrichum excelsum-altitudinum
- Colletotrichum parallelophorum
- Colletotrichum tongrenense
- Colletotrichum tropicicola
- Colletotrichum yunnanense

=== Colletotrichum gigasporum species complex ===
- Colletotrichum arxii
- Colletotrichum chiangraiense
- Colletotrichum gigasporum sensu stricto
- Colletotrichum jishouense
- Colletotrichum magnisporum
- Colletotrichum pseudomajus
- Colletotrichum radicis
- Colletotrichum serranegrense
- Colletotrichum vietnamense

=== Colletotrichum gloeosporioides species complex ===
- Colletotrichum aenigma
- Colletotrichum aeschynomenes
- Colletotrichum alatae
- Colletotrichum alienum
- Colletotrichum aotearoa
- Colletotrichum arecicola
- Colletotrichum artocarpicola
- Colletotrichum asianum
- Colletotrichum avicenniae
- Colletotrichum camelliae
- Colletotrichum changpingense
- Colletotrichum chrysophillum
- Colletotrichum cigarro
- Colletotrichum clidemiae
- Colletotrichum cobbittiense
- Colletotrichum conoides
- Colletotrichum cordylinicola
- Colletotrichum endophytica
- Colletotrichum fragariae
- Colletotrichum fructicola
- Colletotrichum fructivorum
- Colletotrichum gloeosporioides sensu stricto
- Colletotrichum grevilleae
- Colletotrichum grossum
- Colletotrichum hebeiense
- Colletotrichum hederiicola
- Colletotrichum helleniense
- Colletotrichum henanense
- Colletotrichum horii
- Colletotrichum hystricis
- Colletotrichum jiangxiense
- Colletotrichum kahawae
- Colletotrichum lumnitzerae
- Colletotrichum makassarense
- Colletotrichum musae
- Colletotrichum noveboracense
- Colletotrichum nupharicola
- Colletotrichum perseae
- Colletotrichum proteae
- Colletotrichum pseudotheobromicola
- Colletotrichum psidii
- Colletotrichum queenslandicum
- Colletotrichum rhexiae
- Colletotrichum salsolae
- Colletotrichum siamense
- Colletotrichum syzygiicola
- Colletotrichum tainanense
- Colletotrichum temperatum
- Colletotrichum theobromicola
- Colletotrichum ti
- Colletotrichum tropicale
- Colletotrichum viniferum
- Colletotrichum wuxiense
- Colletotrichum xanthorrhoeae
- Colletotrichum yulongense

=== Colletotrichum graminicola-caudatum species complex ===
- Colletotrichum alcornii
- Colletotrichum axonopodi
- Colletotrichum baltimorense
- Colletotrichum caudasporum
- Colletotrichum caudatum sensu stricto
- Colletotrichum cereale
- Colletotrichum duyunensis
- Colletotrichum echinochloae
- Colletotrichum eleusines
- Colletotrichum endophytum
- Colletotrichum eremochloae
- Colletotrichum tucumanensis
- Colletotrichum graminicola sensu stricto
- Colletotrichum hainanense
- Colletotrichum hanaui
- Colletotrichum jacksonii
- Colletotrichum miscanthi
- Colletotrichum navitas
- Colletotrichum nicholsonii
- Colletotrichum ochracea
- Colletotrichum paspali
- Colletotrichum somersetense
- Colletotrichum sublineola
- Colletotrichum zoysiae

=== Colletotrichum magnum species complex ===
- Colletotrichum brevisporum
- Colletotrichum cacao
- Colletotrichum liaoningense
- Colletotrichum lobatum
- Colletotrichum magnum sensu stricto
- Colletotrichum merremiae
- Colletotrichum okinawense
- Colletotrichum panamense

=== Colletotrichum orbiculare species complex ===
- Colletotrichum bidentis
- Colletotrichum lindemuthianum
- Colletotrichum malvarum
- Colletotrichum orbiculare sensu stricto
- Colletotrichum sidae
- Colletotrichum spinosum
- Colletotrichum tebeestii
- Colletotrichum trifolii

=== Colletotrichum orchidearum species complex ===
- Colletotrichum aracearum
- Colletotrichum cattleyicola
- Colletotrichum cliviicola
- Colletotrichum musicola
- Colletotrichum orchidearum sensu stricto
- Colletotrichum piperis
- Colletotrichum plurivorum
- Colletotrichum sojae
- Colletotrichum vittalense

=== Colletotrichum spaethianum species complex ===
- Colletotrichum bletillum
- Colletotrichum guizhouensis
- Colletotrichum incanum
- Colletotrichum lilii
- Colletotrichum liriopes
- Colletotrichum riograndense
- Colletotrichum spaethianum sensu stricto
- Colletotrichum tofieldiae
- Colletotrichum verruculosum

=== Colletotrichum truncatum species complex ===
- Colletotrichum acidae
- Colletotrichum curcumae
- Colletotrichum fusiforme
- Colletotrichum jasminigenum
- Colletotrichum truncatum sensu stricto

=== Singleton species ===
- Colletotrichum chlorophyti
- Colletotrichum coccodes
- Colletotrichum hsienjenchang
- Colletotrichum metake
- Colletotrichum nigrum
- Colletotrichum phaseolorum
- Colletotrichum pyrifoliae
- Colletotrichum rusci
- Colletotrichum sydowii
- Colletotrichum trichellum

==== Species names that are no longer valid or have been synonymized ====
- Colletotrichum arachidis
- Colletotrichum capsici
- Colletotrichum coffeanum
- Colletotrichum crassipes
- Colletotrichum derridis
- Colletotrichum gossypii
- Colletotrichum mangenotii
- Colletotrichum pandanicola
- Colletotrichum sublineolum
