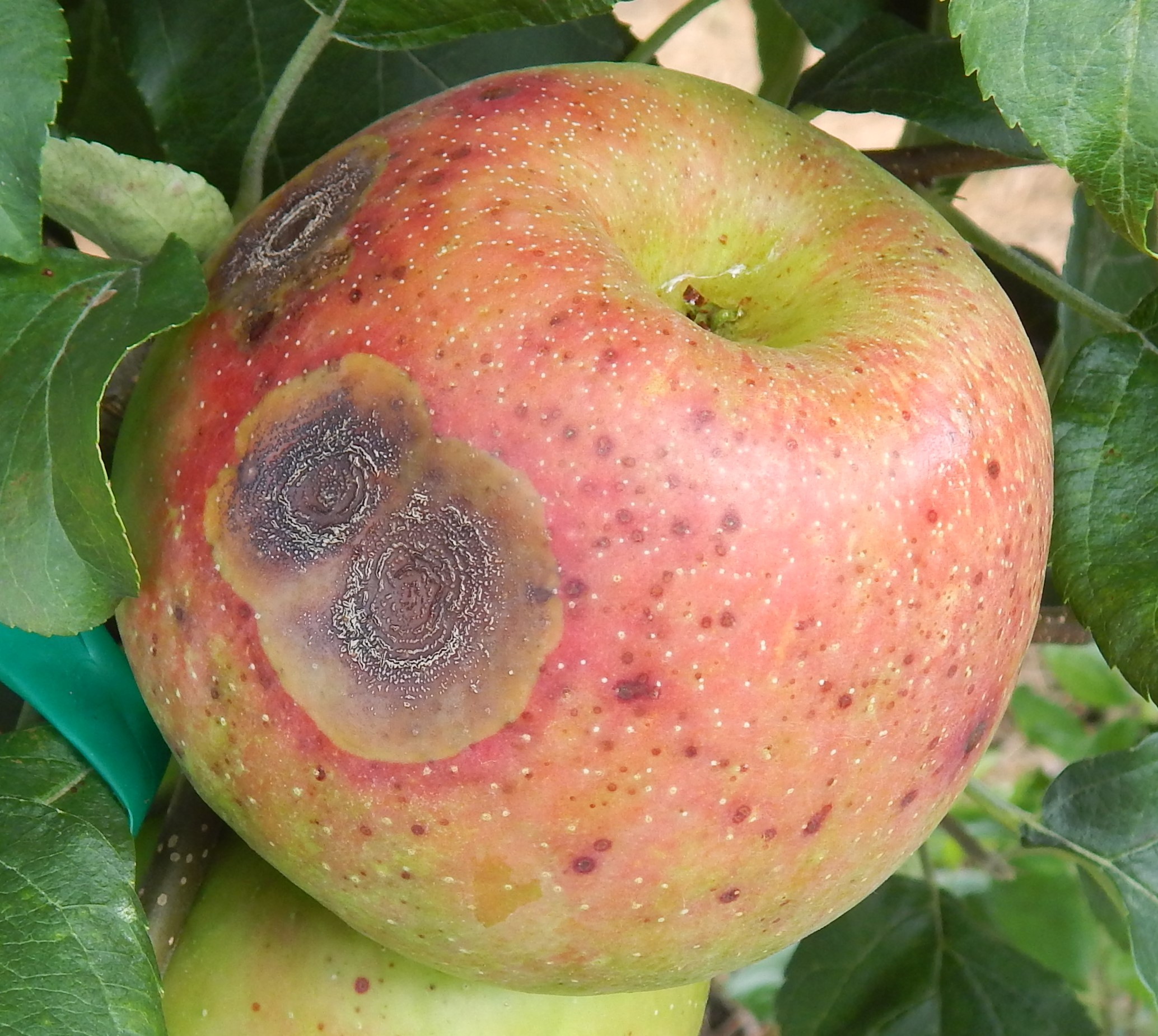
- Bitter rot on Honeycrisp Apple caused by Colletotrichum species complex

Scientific classification
- Kingdom: Fungi
- Division: Ascomycota
- Clade: Leotiomyceta
- (unranked): Sordariomyceta
- Class: Sordariomycetes
- Subclass: Hypocreomycetidae
- Order: Glomerellales; Chadef. ex Réblová, W. Gams & Seifert (2011)

Families
- Reticulascaceae; Glomerellaceae; Australiascaceae; Plectosphaerellaceae; Malaysiascaceae

= Glomerellales =

Order of fungi

Glomerellales is an order of ascomycetous fungi within the subclass Hypocreomycetidae (Sordariomycetes). The order includes saprobes, endophytes and pathogens on plants, animals and other fungi with representatives found all over the world in varying habitats.

Glomerellales members diagnostically present peritheciate ascomata with a 2-3 layered perithecial wall and a periphysate ostiolum. Paraphyses are tapered and thin-walled. The asci are unitunicate, 8-spored and inamyloid, and the apex is either thickened without visible discharge mechanism or thin-walled with a distinct annulus.

Unlike other orders within Hypocreomycetidae, members of the Glomerellales exhibit a darkly pigmented perithecia. The order was first recognized by Chadefaud (1960), although it was not validly published at this time. It has since been cited by Lanier et al. (1978) and invalidly published by Locquin (1984). However the Glomerellales was still not valid until the study by M. Réblová et al. in 2011 with three families viz. Australiascaceae, Glomerellaceae and Reticulascaceae based on multi-locus phylogenetic analysis.

== Ecology ==
Families Reticulascaceae and Malaysiascaceae are typically involved in nutrient cycling as saprobes on decaying plant matter. Australiascaceae contains many food plant pathogens in addition to saprobic species and Glomerellaceae with its single genus Colletotrichum likewise presents many important plant pathogens of which some have significant economical impact.

Several examples of well-known food pathogens can be found in Colletotrichum with members such as the Colletotrichum acutatum species complex associated with bitter rot of apple, Colletotrichum graminicola which causes disease in corn crops and Colletotrichum kahawae associated with coffee berry disease in Coffea arabica.

The genus rich family Plectosphaerellaceae holds a variety of both saprobes and plant pathogens, as well as several species of opportunistic animal pathogens. Some species are also used as biocontrol agents, making the Plectosphaerellaceae an important group for study on many levels.

== Taxonomy ==
Glomerellales contains five families and 31 placed genera (as of 2020):

- Reticulascaceae (Réblová & W. Gams, 2011)
- Blastophorum (Matsush., 1971)
- Cylindrotrichum (Bonord., 1851)
- Kylindria (DiCosmo, S.M. Berch & W.B. Kendr., 1983)
- Sporoschismopsis (Hol.-Jech. & Hennebert, 1972)
- Glomerellaceae (Locq. ex Seifert & W.G. Gams, 2011)
  - Colletotrichum (Corda, 1831)
- Australiascaceae (Réblová & W. Gams, 2011)
  - Monilochaetes (Halst. J., 1916)
- Plectosphaerellaceae (W. Gams, Summerbell & Zare, 2007)
- Acremoniisimulans (Tibpromma & K.D. Hyde, 2018)
- Acrostalagmus (Corda, 1838)
- Brunneochlamydosporium (Giraldo López & Crous, 2018)
- Brunneomyces (Giraldo, Gene & Guarro, 2017)
- Chlamydosporiella (Giraldo López & Crous, 2019)
- Chordomyces (Bilanenko, Georgieva & Grum-Grzhim., 2015)
- Furcasterigmium (Giraldo López & Crous, 2019)
- Fuscohypha (Giraldo López & Crous, 2019)
- Gibellulopsis (Bat. & H. Maia, 1959)
- Lectera (P.F. Cannon, 2012)
- Longitudinalis (Tibpromma & K.D. Hyde, 2017)
- Musicillium (Zare & W. Gams, 2007)
- Musidium (Giraldo López & Crous, 2019)
- Nigrocephalum (Giraldo López & Crous, 2019)
- Paragibellulopsis (Giraldo López & Crous, 2019)
- Paramusicillium (Giraldo López & Crous, 2019)
- Phialoparvum (Giraldo López & Crous, 2019)
- Plectosphaerella (Kleb., 1929)
- Sayamraella (Giraldo López & Crous, 2019)
- Sodiomycetes (A.A. Grum-Grzhim., 2019)
- Stachylidium (Link, 1809)
- Summerbellia (Giraldo López & Crous, 2019)
- Theobromium (Giraldo López & Crous, 2019)
- Verticillium (Nees, 1816)
- Malaysiascaceae (Tibpromma & K.D. Hyde, 2018)
  - Malaysiasca (Crous & M.J. Wingf., 2016)

Glomerellales also currently includes some genera Incertae sedis, including Ascodinea (Samuels, Cand & Magni, 1997) and the more recent Wenhuisporus (C.H. Kuo & Goh, 2022).

== History ==
Réblová et al. described Glomerellales in 2011 and simultaneously introduced the three families Reticulascaceae, Australiascaceae and Glomerellascaceae. In 2015 and 2016, the previously described Incertae sedis Sordariomycetes group Plectosphaerellales was placed in Glomerellales based on molecular data phylogenetic analyses. Tibpromma and K.D. Hyde later described a new family Malaysiascaceae (2018) to accommodate the previously described Incertae sedis Glomerellales genus Malaysiasca (Crous & M.J. Wingf., 2016).

After a convoluted path to legitimized description, Glomerellales has been established as a monophyletic group through phylogenetic analyses. However, there appears to be some discrepancy between the literature and some of the common species databases when it comes to one of its members, the family Australiascaceae. While publications refer to this group and its members as a family within Glomerellales based on phylogenetic analyses using molecular data, as of March 2022 several major databases place Australiascaceae in Chaetosphaeriales (GBIF, EOL, COL, MycoBank, see references or taxon identifiers below) with reference to the original Glomerellales description in Réblová et al. (2011) (which introduces Australiascaceae and places it in Glomerellales). There appears to be no discussion about this discrepancy or its cause as of yet.
