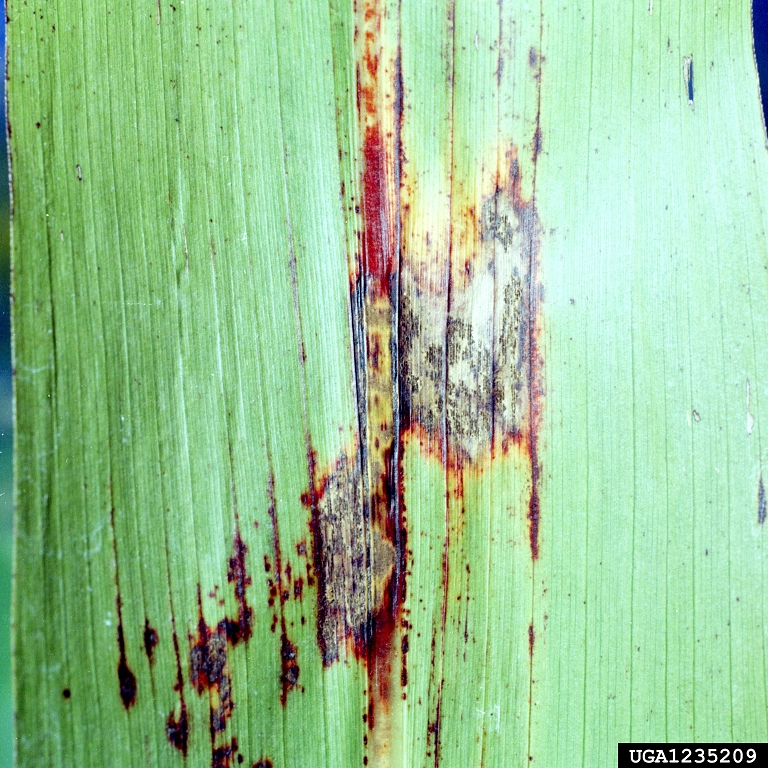
- Colletotrichum graminicola lesions on Sorghum

Scientific classification
- Kingdom: Fungi
- Division: Ascomycota
- (unranked): Sordariomyceta
- Class: Sordariomycetes
- Subclass: Hypocreomycetidae
- Order: Glomerellales
- Family: Glomerellaceae (Locq.) ex Seifert & W. Gams, 2007

Genera
- Colletotrichum

= Glomerellaceae =

Family of fungi

Glomerellaceae is a monotypic family of fungi in the class Sordariomycetes that contains only one genus, Colletotrichum.

== Genera ==
Colletotrichum (sexual stage is Glomerella)
