= Hairy nightshade =

Hairy nightshade is a common name for several plants and may refer to:

- Solanum physalifolium
- Solanum sarrachoides
- Solanum villosum
