= List of canola diseases =

This article is a list of diseases of rapeseed and canola (Brassica napus and B. rapa or B. campestris).

== Bacterial diseases ==
Bacterial diseases
Bacterial black rot	Xanthomonas campestris pv. campestris = Xanthomonas campestris pv. aberrans
Bacterial leaf spot	Xanthomonas campestris pv. raphani
Bacterial pod rot	Pseudomonas syringae pv. maculicola
Bacterial soft rot	Erwinia carotovora Pseudomonas marginalis pv. marginalis
Scab	Streptomyces spp. Streptomyces scabiei = Streptomyces scabies
Crown gall	Agrobacterium tumefaciens

== Fungal diseases ==
Fungal diseases
Alternaria black spot = dark pod spot (UK)	Alternaria brassicae Alternaria brassicicola Alternaria japonica = Alternaria raphani
Anthracnose	Colletotrichum gloeosporioides Glomerella cingulata [teleomorph] Colletotrichum higginsianum
Black leg = stem canker (UK)	Leptosphaeria maculans Phoma lingam [anamorph]
Black mold rot	Rhizopus stolonifer
Black root	Aphanomyces raphani
Brown girdling root rot	Rhizoctonia solani Thanatephorus cucumeris [teleomorph]
Cercospora leaf spot	Cercospora brassicicola
Clubroot	Plasmodiophora brassicae
Downy mildew	Peronospora parasitica
Fusarium wilt	Fusarium oxysporum f.sp. conglutinans
Gray mold	Botrytis cinerea Botryotinia fuckeliana [teleomorph]
Head rot	Rhizoctonia solani Thanatephorus cucumeris [teleomorph]
Leaf spot	Alternaria alternata Ascochyta spp.
Light leaf spot	Pyrenopeziza brassicae Cylindrosporium concentricum [anamorph]
Pod rot	Alternaria alternata Cladosporium spp.
Powdery mildew	Erysiphe radulescui
Ring spot	Mycosphaerella brassicicola Asteromella brassicae [anamorph]
Root rot	Alternaria alternata Fusarium spp. Macrophomina phaseolina Phymatotrichopsis omnivora Phytophthora megasperma Pythium debaryanum Pythium irregulare Rhizoctonia solani Thanatephorus cucumeris [teleomorph] Sclerotium rolfsii Athelia rolfsii [teleomorph]
Sclerotinia stem rot	Sclerotinia sclerotiorum
Seed rot, damping-off	Alternaria spp. Fusarium spp. Gliocladium roseum Nectria ochroleuca [teleomorph] Pythium spp. Rhizoctonia solani Thanatephorus cucumeris [teleomorph] Rhizopus stolonifer Sclerotium rolfsii
Root gall smut	Urocystis brassicae
Southern blight (leaf, root, and seed rot)	Sclerotium rolfsii
Verticillium wilt	Verticillium longisporum
White blight	Rhizoctonia solani Thanatephorus cucumeris [teleomorph]
White leaf spot = grey stem (Canada)	Pseudocercosporella capsellae = Cercosporella brassicae Mycosphaerella capsellae [teleomorph]
White rust = staghead	Albugo candida = Albugo cruciferarum (Peronospora sp. commonly present in staghead phase)
Yellows	Fusarium oxysporum

== Viral diseases ==
Viral diseases
Crinkle	genus Carmovirus, turnip crinkle virus (TCV)
Mosaic	genus Caulimovirus, cauliflower mosaic virus(CaMV) genus Cucumovirus, cucumber mosaic virus (CMV) genus Comovirus, radish mosaic virus (RaMV) genus Potyvirus, turnip yellow mosaic virus (TuMV)
Yellows	genus Luteovirus, beet western yellows virus (BWYV) genus Cytorhabdovirus, broccoli necrotic yellows virus (BNYV)

== Phytoplasmal diseases ==
Phytoplasmal diseases
Aster yellows and phyllody	Aster yellows phytoplasma

== Miscellaneous diseases and disorders ==
Miscellaneous diseases and disorders
Autogenic necrosis	Genetic disorder
Black speck	Physiological
Sulfur deficiency	Sulfur deficiency
Tipburn	Calcium deficiency
