= Verticillium longisporum =

Scientific classification
- Kingdom: Fungi
- Division: Ascomycota
- Class: Sordariomycetes
- Order: Glomerellales
- Family: Plectosphaerellaceae
- Genus: Verticillium
- Species: V. longisporum

Binomial name
- Verticillium longisporum (C.Stark) Karapapa, Bainbr. & Heale (1997)

Synonyms
- Verticillium dahliae var. longisporum C.Stark (1961)

Species of fungus

Verticillium longisporum, also known as Verticillium Wilt, is a fungal plant pathogen that commonly infects canola. V. longisporum can attack other brassica plants as well as woody ornamentals. A main symptom of the infected plant is wilting. In America, V. longsiporum primarily effects eudicot plants. This pathogen can be very devastating and hard to eradicate, responding only to expensive fumigation or fungal resistant plants.

== Host and symptoms ==
The main host of V. longisporum is canola. However, it can also affect brassica type plants. These include cabbage, broccoli, mustard, and cauliflower. It is common for Verticillium spp. to be virulent to more than one host.

Symptoms of wilts caused by V. longisporum include leaf wilting, necrosis, and stunting. Brown stripes on the Canola plant also become visible as it is produced. As the Canola plant matures, peeling the top layer back reveals microsclerotia grown from the fungus. The wilts caused by V. longisporum are identified based on the main symptom of wilting. When the pathogen enters the plant, it clogs the xylem and cause key nutrients to not reach stems or leaves, which cause a wilt. Another key feature of the pathogen is that symptoms are typically found on outer or lower parts of the plant in a localized area. Most plants can live with the disease based on the severity. Older plants, especially trees, will have an increased chance of survival while younger plants have a higher susceptibility of death caused by the disease. If a plant has a pre-existing disease, the chance of being infected and dying from the V. longisporum increases.

== Life cycle ==
Like most Verticillium spp., Verticillium longisporum is a fungus that primarily lives in the soil. The life cycle of V. longisporum is very similar to that of V. dahliae. V. longisporum is able to survive using overwintering structures that can survive in the soil, called microsclerotia. Microsclerotia are masses of hyphae that are produced in the dying part of the plant and are used to infect healthy plants. When a canola root is near the microsclerotia, the fungi will grow towards it. Root exudates cause the microsclerotia to germinate. Once the fungus has entered the root, it will produce hyphae to move through the plant. The fungi also use conidia to transport. Once the fungi reaches the xylem, it can quickly colonize the plant. This causes the plant to start slowly dying. This is due to fungal growth and plant defenses clogging the xylem, so the plant cannot take up nutrients in this area. Once there is enough dead plant tissue, the fungus will produce more microsclerotia. The process will then continue to repeat. This is the only known life cycle of V. longisporum. The pathogen is only known to cause asexual disease. The fungus is primarily spread via soil cultivation, harvesting, or any action that causes movement of the soil. Verticillium spp. do a spectacular job of being able to germinate, spread within the plant, and reproduce in most weather types. With this, water is usually necessary for the germination of the resting spore to first affect plants. This causes the disease to be most infectious during the spring when there is a lot of water in the ground and new, young plants are present.

== Environment ==
Verticillium longisporum is favorable in conditions that are hot and dry with soil and air temperatures of 15-19 °C and 15-23 °C. The disease easily enters the vascular system to infect when root and xylem function is reduced due to stressful conditions. Excess moisture and warm soil temperature protects the plant from V. longisporum and makes it less of a problem because the survival structures rapidly lose viability. The pathogen can survive harsh, cold weather and winters due to the thick walled microsclerotia it produces. V. longisporum is extremely difficult to eradicate due to its ability to endure fluctuating conditions.

== Importance ==
Verticillium longisporum is known to cause the disease Verticillium wilt in oilseed crops. This disease is responsible for major yield loss with reports as high as 72%. Oilseed is grown worldwide with a few countries being China, Canada, United Kingdom, and Australia. Historically, oilseed was used in the production of oil for lamps, soap making, and high temperature lubricating oils. More currently, it is produced for canola oil, biodiesel and a byproduct in animal feed. With the world’s drive to find a sustainable energy source and its need to consume large amount of meat, large yield losses can be very detrimental. In European cultivars only low-level resistance against this pathogen is found. The survival of the microsclerotia in the soil means that the field cannot grow oilseed for many years in order to avoid disease.

== See also ==
- List of canola diseases
- Verticillium Dahliae
