= Verticillium wilt =

Fungal disease of flowering plants

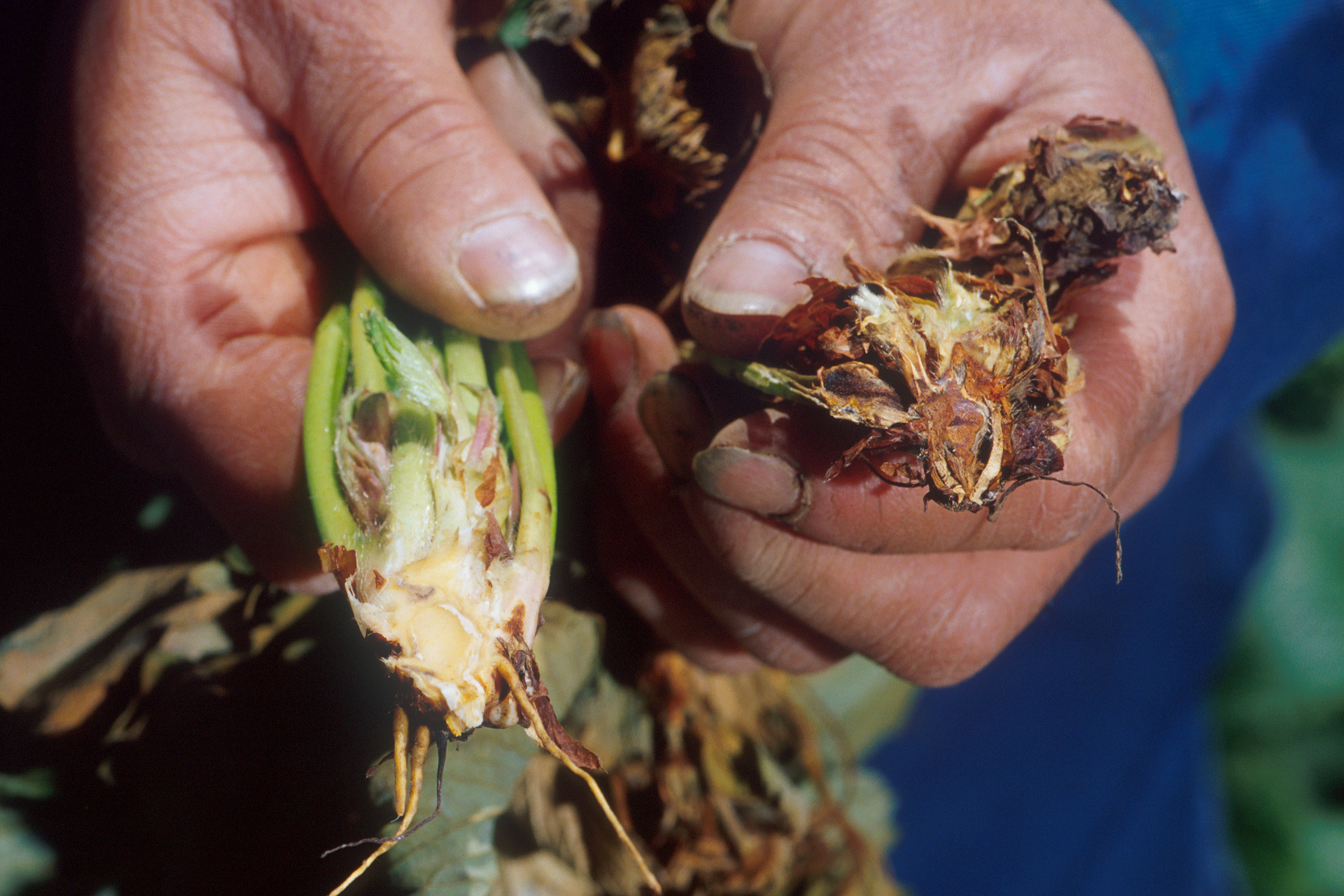
- Healthy strawberry plant (left) and strawberry plant infected with verticillium wilt (right)
- Causal agents: Verticillium albo-atrum; Verticillium dahliae; Verticillium longisporum; Verticillium nubilum; Verticillium theobromae; Verticillium tricorpus

Verticillium wilt is a wilt disease affecting over 350 species of eudicot plants. It is caused by six species within the Verticillium fungal genus: V. dahliae, V. albo-atrum, V. longisporum, V. nubilum, V. theobromae and V. tricorpus. Many economically important plants are susceptible including cotton, tomatoes, potatoes, oilseed rape, eggplants, peppers and ornamentals, as well as others in natural vegetation communities. Many eudicot species and cultivars are resistant to the disease and all monocots, gymnosperms and ferns are immune.

Signs are superficially similar to Fusarium wilts. There are no fungicides characterized for the control of this disease but soil fumigation with chloropicrin has been proven successful in dramatically reducing Verticillium wilt in diverse crops such as vegetables using plasticulture production methods, and in non-tarped potato production in North America . Additional strategies to manage the disease include crop rotation, the use of resistant varieties and deep plowing (to accelerate the decomposition of infected plant residue). In recent years, pre-plant soil fumigation with chloropicrin in non-tarped, raised beds has proven to be economically viable and beneficial for reducing wilt disease and increasing yield and quality of potato in North America. Soil fumigation is a specialized practice requiring special permits, equipment, and expertise, so qualified personnel must be employed.

== Hosts and symptoms ==
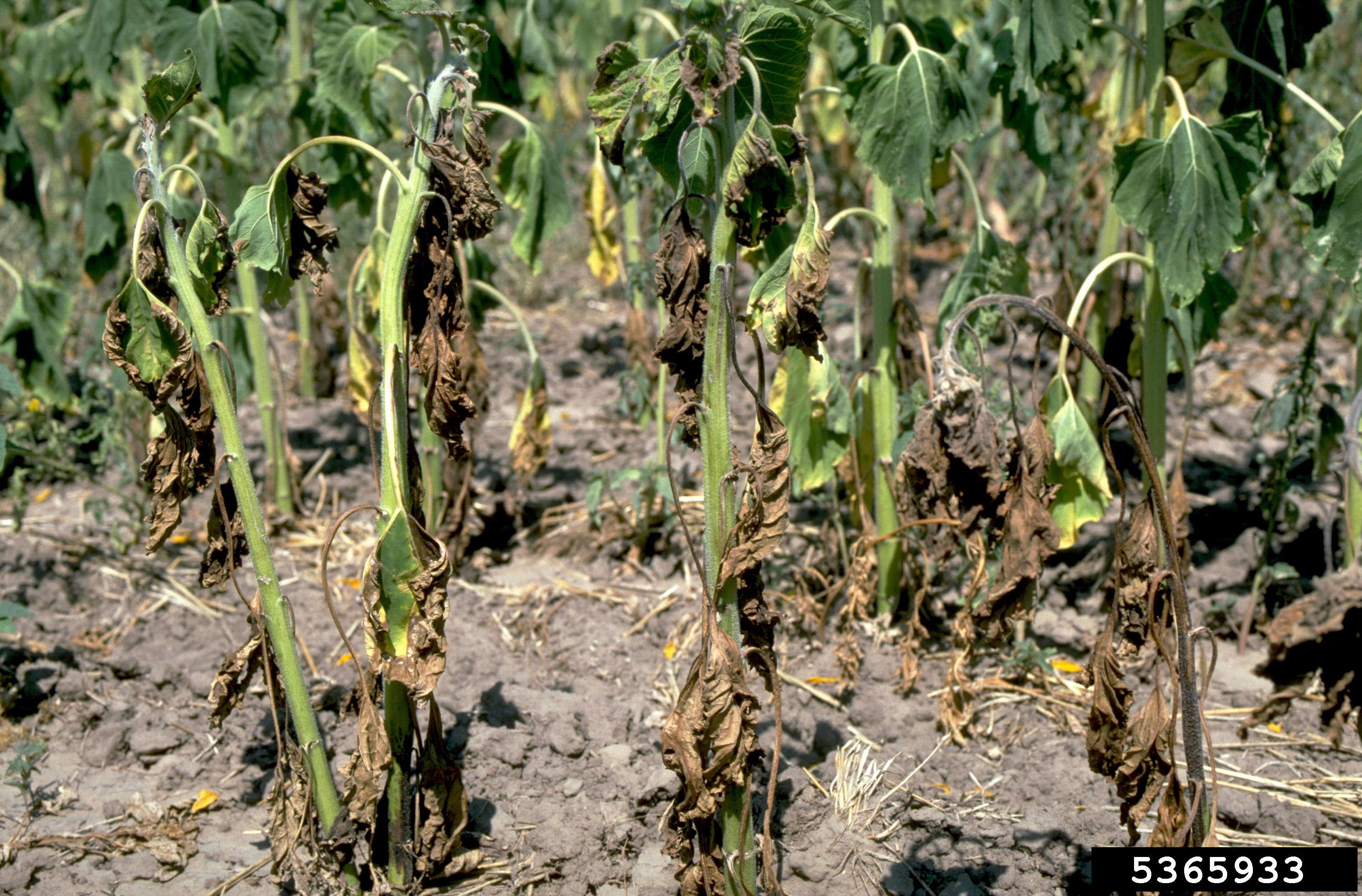
Verticillium dahliae infected sunflowers.

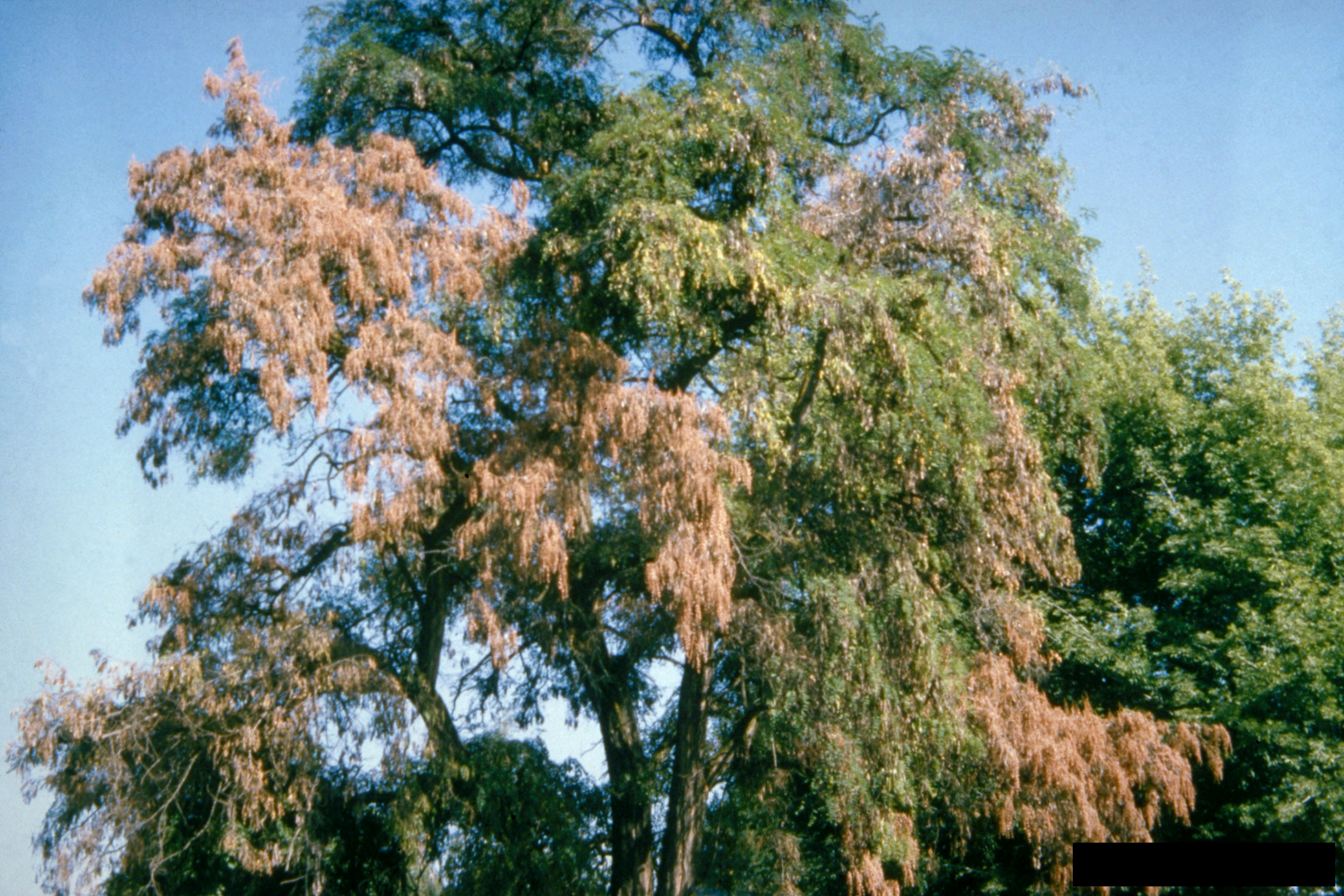
Verticillium albo-atrum infected tree crown.

Verticillium species attack a very large host range including more than 350 species of vegetables, fruit trees, flowers, field crops, and shade or forest trees. Most vegetable species have some susceptibility, resulting in a very wide host range. A list of known hosts is at the bottom of this page.

The symptoms are similar to most wilts with a few specifics unique to Verticillium. Wilt itself is the most common symptom, with wilting of the stem and leaves occurring due to the blockage of the xylem vascular tissues and therefore reduced water and nutrient flow. In small plants and seedlings, Verticillium can quickly kill the plant while in larger, more developed plants the severity can vary. Sometimes only one side of the plant will appear infected because once in the vascular tissues, the disease migrates mostly upward and not as much radially in the stem. Other symptoms include stunting, chlorosis or yellowing of the leaves, necrosis or tissue death, and defoliation. Internal vascular tissue discoloration might be visible when the stem is cut.

In Verticillium infections, the symptoms and effects will often only be on the lower or outer parts of plants or will be localized to only a few branches of a tree. In older plants, the infection can cause death, but often, especially with trees, the plant will be able to recover, or at least continue living with the infection. The severity of the infection plays a large role in how severe the signs are and how quickly they develop.

== Disease cycle ==
While Verticillium spp. are very diverse, the basic life cycle of the pathogen is similar across species, except in their survival structures. The survival structures vary by species with V. albo-atrum forming mycelium, V. dahliae forming microsclerotia, V. nigrescens and V. nubilum forming chlamydospores, and V. tricorpus forming all three. While resting, many factors such as soil chemistry, temperature, hydration, micro fauna, and non-host crops all have an effect on the viability of the resting structure. Mycelium have been observed remaining viable for at least 4 years, while microsclerotia have been observed in fields planted with non-host crops for over 10 years and even 15 years has been reported. Viability is reduced at these extremes, but the long survivability of these structures is an important aspect for Verticillium control.

When roots of a host crop come near the resting structure (about 2mm), root exudate promotes germination and the fungi grows out of the structure and toward the plant. Being a vascular wilt, it will try to get to the vascular system on the inside of the plant, and therefore must enter the plant. Natural root wounds are the easiest way to enter, and these wounds occur naturally, even in healthy plants because of soil abrasion on roots. Verticillium has also been observed entering roots directly, but these infections rarely make it to the vascular system, especially those that enter through root hairs.

Once the pathogen enters the host, it makes its way to the vascular system, and specifically the xylem. The fungi can spread as hyphae through the plant, but can also spread as spores. Verticillium produce conidia on conidiophores and once conidia are released in the xylem, they can quickly colonize the plant. Conidia have been observed traveling to the top of cotton plants, 115 cm (45 in), 24 hours after initial conidia inoculation, so the spread throughout the plant can occur very quickly. Sometimes the flow of conidia will be stopped by cross sections of the xylem, and here the conidia will spawn, and the fungal hyphae can overcome the barrier, and then produce more conidia on the other side.

A heavily infected plant can succumb to the disease and die. As this occurs, the Verticillium will form its survival structures and when the plant dies, its survival structures will be where the plant falls, releasing inoculates into the environment. The survival structures will then wait for a host plant to grow nearby and will start the cycle all over again.

Besides being long lasting in the soil, Verticillium can spread in many ways. The most common way of spreading short distances is through root to root contact within the soil. Roots in natural conditions often have small damages or openings in them that are easily colonized by Verticillium from an infected root nearby. Air borne conidia have been detected and some colonies observed, but mostly the conidia have difficulty developing above ground on healthy plants. In open channel irrigation, V. dahliae have been found in the irrigation ditches up to a mile from the infected crop.

Without fungicidal seed treatments, infected seeds are easily transported and the disease spread, and Verticillium has been observed remaining viable for at least 13 months on some seeds. Planting infected seed potatoes can also be a source of inoculum to a new field. Finally, insects have also been shown to transmit the disease. Many insects including potato leaf hopper, leaf cutter bees, and aphids have been observed transmitting conidia of Verticillium and because these insects can cause damage to the plant creating an entry for the Verticillium, they can help transmit the disease.

== Environment ==
While Verticillium wilts often have the same symptoms of Fusarium wilts, Verticillium can survive cold weather and winters much better than Fusarium, which prefers warmer climates. The resting structures of Verticillium are able to survive freezing, thawing, heat shock, dehydration, and many other factors and are quite robust and difficult to get rid of. The one factor they do not tolerate well is extended periods of anaerobic conditions (such as during flooding).

Verticillium will grow best between 20 and 28 degrees Celsius, but germination and growth can occur well below (or above) those temperatures. Still, Verticillium will generally not survive in the branches and trunks of infected trees during hot, dry seasons in regions such as summer in southern California. This does not generally "cure" the entire tree, however, and recurrence can happen via a reinfection from the roots during winter and spring. Water is necessary for resting structure germination, but is not as important for the spread of the fungus as in many other fungi. While not an environmental requirement for the fungus, stressed plants, often brought on by environmental changes, are easier to attack than healthy plants, so any conditions that will stress the plant but not directly harm the Verticillium will be beneficial for Verticillium wilt development.

== Management ==
Verticillium wilt begins as a mild, local infection, which over a few years will grow in strength as more virile strains of the fungus develop. If left unchecked the disease will become so widespread that the crop will need to be replaced with resistant varieties, or a new crop will need to be planted altogether.

Control of Verticillium can be achieved by planting disease–free plants in uncontaminated soil, planting resistant varieties, and refraining from planting susceptible crops in areas that have been used repeatedly for solanaceous crops. Soil fumigation can also be used, with chloropicrin being particularly effective in reducing disease incidence in contaminated fields.

In tomato plants, the presence of ethylene during the initial stages of infection inhibits disease development, while in later stages of disease development the same hormone will cause greater wilt. Tomato plants are available that have been engineered with resistant genes that will tolerate the fungus while showing significantly lower signs of wilting.

Verticillium albo-altrum, V. dahliae and V. longisporum can overwinter as melanized mycelium or microsclerotia within live vegetation or plant debris. As a result, it can be important to clear plant debris to lower the spread of disease. V. dahliae and V. longisporum are able to survive as microsclerotia in soil for up to 15 years.

== Importance ==
Verticillium wilt occurs in a broad range of hosts but has similar devastating effects on many of these plants. In general, it reduces the quality and quantity of a crop by causing discoloration in tissues, stunting, and premature defoliation and death. Stock from infested nurseries may be restricted. Once a plant is infected, there is no way to cure it. Verticillium wilt is especially a concern in temperate areas and areas that are irrigated. Verticllium spp. can naturally occur in forest soils and when these soils are cultivated, the pathogen will infect the crop.

The Salinas Valley in California has had severe problems with Verticillium wilt since 1995, most likely due to flooding in the winter of 1995. Many areas in the Salinas and Pajaro Valleys are unable to grow lettuce due to the high levels of Verticillium dahliae in the soil. Potatoes grown in Verticillium infested soils may have a reduced yield between 30 and 50% compared to potatoes grown in "clean" soil. Verticillium wilt has also caused a shift in peppermint cultivation from the Midwest in the mid- to late-1800s to western states such as Oregon, Washington and Idaho, to new, non-infested areas within these states now.

== Lists of plants susceptible or resistant ==
Replanting susceptible species on the site of a removed plant that has succumbed to V. albo-atrum or V. dahliae is inadvisable because of the heightened risk of infection. Instead, resistant or immune varieties should be used. The following two lists show both susceptible and resistant/immune plants by Latin name.

(*) indicates that the plant occurs on both lists because different varieties or cultivars vary in their resistance.
(#) indicates that some strains are resistant.
(+) indicates susceptibility to some European strains of Verticillium albo-atrum.

=== Susceptible plants ===
- Abelmoschus esculentus (also known as Hibiscus esculentus) (Okra)
- Abutilon spp. (Abutilon)
- Acer spp. (Maple)
- Acer negundo (Box Elder)
- Aconitum (Monkshood, Aconite)
- Aesculus hippocastanum (Horsechestnut)
- Aesculus glabra (Ohio Buckeye)
- Ailanthus altissima (Tree of Heaven)
- Albizia (Mimosa)
- Amaranthus retroflexus (Rough Pigweed)
- (*) Amelanchier (Serviceberry)
- Antirrhinum majus (Snapdragon)
- Arabidopsis thaliana (Thale cress)
- Arachis hypogaea (Peanut)
- Aralia cordata (Udo)
- Aralia racemosa (American spikenard)
- Armoracia lapathifolia (Horseradish)
- Aster spp. (Aster)
- Atropa belladonna (Belladonna)
- Aucuba (Aucuba)
- Berberis (Barberry)
- Brassica napus (Oilseed rape, Rapeseed)
- Brassica napobrassica (Rutabaga, Rapeseed)
- Brassica oleracea var. botrytis (Cauliflower)
- Brassica oleracea var. capitata (Cabbage)
- Brassica oleracea var. gemmifera (Brussels Sprouts)
- Buxus (Box, boxwood)
- Calceolaria spp. (Slipperwort)
- Callirhoe papaver (Poppy mallow)
- Callistephus chinensis (Chinese Aster)
- Camellia (Camellia)
- Campanula spp. (Bellflower)
- Campsis radicans (Trumpet Creeper)
- Cannabis sativa (Hemp, Marijuana)
- Capsicum spp. (Pepper)
- Carpobrotus edulis (Ice Plant)
- Carthamus tinctorius (Safflower)
- Carya illinoinensis (Pecan)
- Catalpa speciosa (Northern Catalpa)
- Catalpa bignonioides (Southern Catalpa)
- Celosia argentea (Cockscomb)
- Centaurea cyanus (Cornflower, Bachelor's button)
- Centaurea imperialis (Sweet Sultan)
- Ceratonia siliqua (Carob)
- Cercis canadensis (Eastern Redbud)
- Cercis siliquastrum (Judas Tree)
- Chenopodium (Goosefoot)
- (#) Chrysanthemum spp. (Chrysanthemum, Marguerite etc.)
- Chrysanthemum leucanthemum (Oxeye Daisy)
- Cinnamomum camphora (Camphor tree)
- Cistus palhinhai (Rock rose)
- Cistus x purpureus (Orchid Spot rock rose)
- Citrullus vulgaris (Watermelon)
- Cladrastis lutea (Yellow wood)
- Clarkia elegans (Clarkia)
- Coreopsis lanceolata (Tickseed)
- (*) Cornus (Dogwood)
- Cosmos (Cosmos)
- Cotinus coggygria (Smoke Tree)
- Cupaniopsis anacardioides (Carrotwood)
- Cucumis melo (Honeydew, Cantaloupe and other melons)
- Cucumis sativus (Cucumber)
- Cucurbita pepo (Pumpkin)
- Cydonia oblonga (Quince)
- Cynara cardunculus (Globe artichoke)
- Dahlia variabilis (Dahlia)
- Delphinium ajacis (Rocket larkspur)
- Digitalis purpurea (Foxglove)
- Dimorphotheca sinuata (Cape marigold)
- Diospyros virginiana (persimmon)
- Dodonaea viscosa (Hopseed)
- Echinacea purpurea (Eastern purple coneflower)
- Elaeagnus (Oleaster, Russian Olive)
- Erica spp. (Heather)
- Erigeron (Fleabane)
- Eschscholzia californica (California poppy)
- Ficus benjamina (weeping fig)
- Ficus retusa (Indian Laurel)
- (#) Fragaria chiloensis (Strawberry)
- Fraxinus pennsylvanica (Ash)
- Fremontodendron spp. (Flannel bush, Fremontia)
- Fuchsia spp. (Fuchsia)
- Gerbera jamesonii (Transvaal daisy)
- Gossypium spp. (Cotton)
- Gymnocladus dioicus (Kentucky Coffeetree)
- Hebe bollonsii (Hebe)
- Hebe x carnea 'Carnea' (Hebe)
- Hebe lewisii (Hebe)
- Hedera (Ivy)
- Helianthus spp. (Sunflower)
- Helichrysum bracteatum (Strawflower)
- Heliotropium arborescens (Heliotrope)
- Humulus (Hop)
- Impatiens balsamina (Garden balsam)
- Impatiens walleriana (Busy Lizzie)
- Jasminum (Jasmine)
- Juglans regia (English walnut)
- Koelreuteria paniculata (goldenrain tree)
- Lampranthus spectabilis (Ice plant)
- Lathyrus odoratus (Sweet pea)
- Liatris spp. (Gayfeather)
- Ligustrum spp. (Privet)
- Linum usitatissimum (Linseed)
- Liriodendron tulipifera (tulip tree)
- Lobelia erinus (Lobelia)
- Lonicera (Honeysuckle)
- Lupinus polyphyllus (Lupin)
- (#) Lycopersicon esculentum (Tomato)
- Maclura pomifera (Osage orange)
- Magnolia (Magnolia)
- Matthiola incana (Stock)
- Melia azedarach (Chinaberry, Persian Lilac)
- Mentha spp. (Mint)
- Monarda fistulosa (Wild Bergamot)
- Nandina domestica (Heavenly bamboo)
- Nicotiana benthamiana (Australian tobacco)
- Nyssa sylvatica (Black Gum)
- Olea europaea (Olive)
- Osteospermum (African daisy)
- Paeonia spp. (Peony)
- Panax quinquefolius (American ginseng)
- Papaver orientale (Oriental poppy)
- Parthenium argentatum (Guayule)
- Parthenocissus (Virginia Creeper)
- Pelargonium spp. (Pelargonium, Geranium)
- Persea americana (Avocado)
- Petunia (Petunia)
- Pistacia (Pistachio)
- Phlox spp. (Phlox)
- Phellodendron (Cork Tree)
- Physalis alkekengi (Chinese lantern plant)
- Polemonium spp. (Polemonium)
- Populus tremula (European aspen)
- Prunus (Cherry, Plum, Peach, Almond, other stone fruit)
- Pyrola spp. (Pyrola)
- Quercus palustris (Pin Oak)
- Quercus rubra (Red oak)
- Raphanus sativus (Radish)
- Reseda odorata (Mignonette)
- Rhaphiolepis (India Hawthorn, Yeddo Hawthorn)
- Rheum rhaponticum (Rhubarb)
- Rhododendron (Azalea, Rhododendron)
- Rhus (Sumac, Lemonade berry)
- Ribes (Gooseberry, Black, White, Red and other currants)
- Ricinus communis (Castor bean)
- Robinia pseudoacacia (Black Locust)
- Romneya coulteri (Tree poppy)
- Rorippa islandica (Marsh Cress)
- Rosa (Rose)
- Rosmarinus officinalis (Rosemary)
- (#) Rubus (Black-, Rasp-, Dew- and other berries)
- Rudbeckia serotinia (Black-eyed susan)
- Salpiglossis sinuata (Painted tongue)
- Salvia farinacea (Mealycup sage)
- Salvia haematodes (Sage)
- Salvia azurea (Blue sage)
- Sambucus spp. (Elderberry)
- Sassafras albidum (Sassafras)
- Schinus (Pepper Tree)
- Schizanthus pinnatus (Butterfly flower)
- Senecio cruentus (Cineraria)
- Senecio vulgaris (Groundsel)
- Sisymbrium irio (London rocket)
- Solanum aethiopicum (Ethiopian Eggplant)
- Solanum carolinense (Carolina horsenettle)
- Solanum elaeagnifolium (White horsenettle)
- Solanum melongena (Eggplant)
- Solanum nigrum (Black nightshade)
- Solanum sarrachoides (Hairy Nightshade)
- Solanum tuberosum (Potato)
- Sorbus torminalis (Wild Service Tree)
- Spinacia oleracea (Spinach)
- Spirea (Meadowsweet, Spirea)
- Styphnolobium (Japanese pagoda tree)
- Syringa (Lilac)
- Taraxacum officinale (Dandelion)
- Tetragonia tetragonioides (formerly T. expansa) (New Zealand spinach)
- (*) Tilia (Lime, Linden)
- Trachelospermum jasminoides (Star jasmine)
- Tragopogon porrifolius (Salsify)
- Ulmus americana (American elm)
- Ulmus procera (English elm)
- Ulmus rubra (Slippery elm)
- Venidium spp. (Namaqualand daisy)
- Viburnum spp. (Viburnum, Wayfaring tree)
- Vigna sesquipedalis (Yard-long bean)
- Vigna sinensis (Cowpea)
- Vitis (Grapevine)
- Weigela (Weigela)

=== Plants resistant or immune ===
==== Clades ====
- Polypodiopsida (ferns and allies)
- Gymnospermae (pines, firs, cycads, ginkgos, etc.)
- Monocotyledoneae (grasses, bananas, palms, lilies, etc.)
- Cactaceae (cacti)

==== Species ====
- Acer pseudoplatanus (Sycamore)
- Ageratum spp. (Ageratum)
- Alnus spp. (Alder)
- Alyssum spp. (Alyssum)
- Althaea rosea (Hollyhock)
- (*) Amelanchier spp. (Serviceberry)
- Anemone spp. (Anemone)
- Apium graveolens (Celery)
- Aquilegia spp. (Columbine)
- Arctostaphylos spp. (Manzanita)
- Asimina triloba (Pawpaw)
- Asparagus officinalis (Asparagus)
- Begonia semperflorens (Waxy or fibrous Begonia)
- Begonia tuberhybrida (Tuberous Begonia)
- Bellis perennis (English daisy)
- Betula spp. (Birch, Hophornbeam)
- Brassica oleracea Italica Group (Broccoli)
- Browallia spp. (Browallia)
- Buxus spp. (Boxwood)
- Calendula officinalis (Marigold)
- Carpinus spp. (Ironwood, Hornbeam)
- Carya (Hickory, Pecan)
- Castanea mollissima (Chinese chestnut)
- Ceanothus spp. (Californian Lilac, Ceanothus, Red root)
- Celtis spp. (Hackberry)
- Cercidiphyllum japonicum (Katsura Tree)
- Cheiranthus cheiri (Wallflower)
- Cistus corbariensis (White rock rose)
- Cistus salvifolius (Sage-leaf rock rose)
- Cistus tauricus (Rock rose)
- Citrus spp. (Orange, Lemon, Grapefruit, etc.)
- Cleome spp. (Cleome)
- (*) Cornus spp. (Dogwood)
- Crataegus spp. (Hawthorn)
- Daucus carota (Carrot)
- Dianthus spp. (Carnation, Pink, Sweet William)
- Eucalyptus spp. (Eucalyptus)
- Fagus spp. (Beech)
- Ficus carica (Fig)
- Gaillardia spp. (Gaillardia)
- Geum spp. (Geum)
- Gleditsia spp. (Honey locust)
- Gypsophila paniculata (Baby's breath)
- Helianthemum nummularium (Sun rose)
- Helleborus niger (Hellebore, Christmas Rose)
- Heuchera sanguinea (Coral bells)
- Iberis spp. (Candytuft)
- Ilex spp. (Holly)
- Impatiens sultani (Hardy Busy Lizzy)
- Ipomoea batatas (Sweet potato)
- Juglans spp. (Walnut, Butternut)
- Juniperus spp. (Juniper)
- Lactuca spp. (Lettuce)
- Lantana spp. (Lantana)
- Larix spp. (larch)
- Liquidambar styraciflua (Sweet gum)
- Lunaria annua (Honesty)
- (+) Malus spp. (Apple)
- (+) Medicago sativa (Alfalfa)
- Mimulus spp. (Monkey flower)
- Morus spp. (Mulberry)
- Nemesia strumosa (Nemesia)
- Nemophila menziesii (Baby blue eyes)
- Nerium oleander (Oleander)
- Nierembergia frutescens (Cupflower)
- Oenothera spp. (Evening primrose)
- Penstemon spp. (Penstemon)
- Phaseolus spp. (Bean)
- Pisum sativum (Pea)
- Platanus spp. (Sycamore, Plane tree)
- Platycodon grandiflorus (Balloon flower)
- Populus (Poplar)
- Portulaca grandiflora (Moss rose)
- Potentilla spp. (Potentilla)
- Primula spp. (Primrose)
- Pyracantha spp. (Firethorn)
- (+) Pyrus spp. (Pear)
- Quercus alba (White oak)
- Quercus falcata (Southern red oak)
- Quercus phellos (Willow oak)
- Quercus virginiana (Live oak)
- Ranunculus asiaticus (Persian buttercup)
- Saintpaulia ionantha (African violet)
- Scabiosa atropurpurea (Scabious)
- Salix spp. (Willow)
- Sorbus aucuparia (European mountain ash)
- (*) Tilia (Lime, Linden)
- Torenia fournieri (Wishbone plant)
- Tropaeolum majus (Nasturtium)
- Umbellularia californica (Californian laurel)
- Verbena hybrida (Verbena)
- Veronica x franciscana (Hebe)
- Veronica elliptica (syn. Hebe x menziesii) (Hebe)
- Veronica salicifolia (Hebe)
- Vinca minor (Periwinkle)
- Viola spp. (Pansy, Viola, Violet)
- Zelkova serrata (Zelkova)
- Zinnia spp. (Zinnia)
