= Moderator lamp =

Oil lamp with a spring mechanism

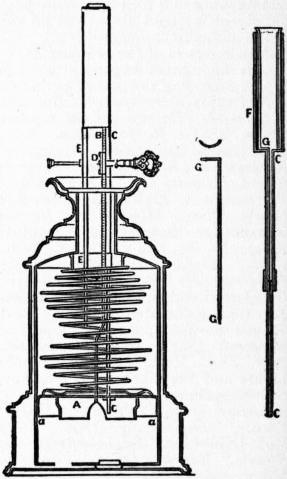
Sectional diagram of a moderator lamp

The moderator lamp is a type of 19th century oil lamp. It displaced the more complex Carcel lamp which used a clockwork pump. Its mechanism was simpler and required less maintenance or repair. The moderator lamp was invented in 1837 by Charles-Louis-Félix Franchot (1809-1881). Like the Carcel lamp the oil reservoir was below the burner and it allowed 360 degree illumination. Earlier oil lamps such as the Argand had a reservoir above the burner which made them top heavy and obscured some of the light. The reliability of the mechanism led to them being adopted in lighthouses.

== Description ==
A moderator lamp provides a pressurized supply of oil to the lamp wick by use of a spiral spring-loaded piston operating on a cylindrical oil reservoir. A regulating mechanism, the "moderator", compensates for the varying force of the spring as the piston descends. The moderator is a wire that runs through a tube in the center of the piston. When the spring is near the top of the reservoir, the wire runs through the full length of the tube. As the piston and tube lowers, and the spring force decreases, the wire is withdrawn from the tube and the flow of oil encounters less resistance. A steady stream of oil flows upward to the wick, with excess oil falling back into the reservoir above the piston.

The piston, made of leather discs clamped between metal washers, was also fitted with a valve to allow the piston to be withdrawn and the reservoir to be filled with oil. A winding key was provided with a rack, so that the piston could be raised and tension placed on the spring. These lamps were fueled by vegetable oil such as colza oil or rapeseed oil. These oils would be too thick to travel up a lamp wick without some applied pressure.

A disadvantage of the lamp was that the weight mechanism had to be manually raised several times in one evening. If this was not done the wick burned.

Moderator lamps replaced the more complex clockwork-driven Carcel lamps and were widely used by the end of the 19th century, for both residential lighting and for lighthouses.
