= Solanum alatum =

Solanum alatum may refer to three different species of plants:

- Solanum alatum Dunal, a taxonomic synonym for Hoehne's nightshade (Solanum hoehnei)
- Solanum alatum Moench, a taxonomic synonym for hairy nightshade (Solanum villosum)
- Solanum alatum Seem. & J.A.Schmidt, a taxonomic synonym for shrubby nightshade (Solanum robustum)
