= Avirulence on Ve1 (Ave1) =

Protein

Avirulence on Ve1 is a protein first described from the fungal plant-pathogen, Verticillium dahliae, and is encoded by the Ave1 gene. The presence of Ave1 in an isolate of Verticillium dahliae conveys an avirulence phenotype when infecting a Tomato host that possesses the R-gene Ve1.

== Orthologous genes ==
Orthologs of Ave1 have been identified in a number of plant pathogenic fungi.

Gene Name	Accession	Organism	Isolate
VdAve1	JN616379	Verticillium dahliae	VdLs17
VdAve1	JQ625338	Verticillium dahliae	Ls16
VdAve1	JQ625339	Verticillium dahliae	CBS381.66
VdAve1	JQ625340	Verticillium dahliae	JR2
VdAve1	JQ625341	Verticillium dahliae	Vd14.01
FoAve1	JQ283440	Fusarium oxysporum f.sp. lycopersici	Fol4287
ChAve1	JQ283439	Colletotrichum higginsianum	
CbAve1	JQ583777	Cercospora beticola	
