= Antoine Quinquet =

French pharmacist (1745–1803)

- Born: 9 March 1745; Soissons, France
- Died: 1803 (aged 57–58)
- Known for: Quinquet lamp

Antoine Quinquet (9 March 1745 – 1803) was a French pharmacist born in Soissons. In 1760 he was apprenticed to an apothecary in Soissons and in 1777 he moved to Paris where he worked for Antoine Baumé. He then travelled to Geneva, where he met Aimé Argand. In 1779, he returned to Paris and opened his own pharmacy there.

== Other scientific interests ==
In 1783, he participated, with Aimé Argand, in the construction of a balloon which was presented to the King by Étienne Montgolfier.

He was interested in better lighting and, also in 1783, he improved on the Argand lamp by adding a glass chimney. These lamps were sold under his own name and became known as Quinquet lamps in France.

He was also interested in magnetism, mineralogy and the formation of hailstones.

In 1794, he became chief pharmacist at the National Hospital.

== Death ==
Quinquet died in 1803.
