= Eastern black nightshade =

Eastern black nightshade may refer to the following plant species:

- Solanum alatum
- Solanum americanum
- Solanum emulans
- Solanum ptychanthum
