= Osuga =

Osuga may refer to:

- Osuga (Tvertsa), a tributary of the river Tvertsa in Russia
- Osuga (Vazuza), a tributary of the river Vazuza in Russia
- Osuga Glacier, a glacier in Victoria Land, Antarctica
- osuga, a Luo name for a species of African nightshade
