= Carcel =

Former French unit for measuring the intensity of light

The carcel is a former French unit for measuring the intensity of light. The unit was defined in 1860 as the intensity of a Carcel lamp with standard burner and chimney dimensions, which burnt colza oil (obtained from the seed of the plant Brassica campestris) at a rate of 42 grams of colza oil per hour with a flame 40 millimeters in height.

In modern terminology, one carcel equals about 9.74 candelas.
