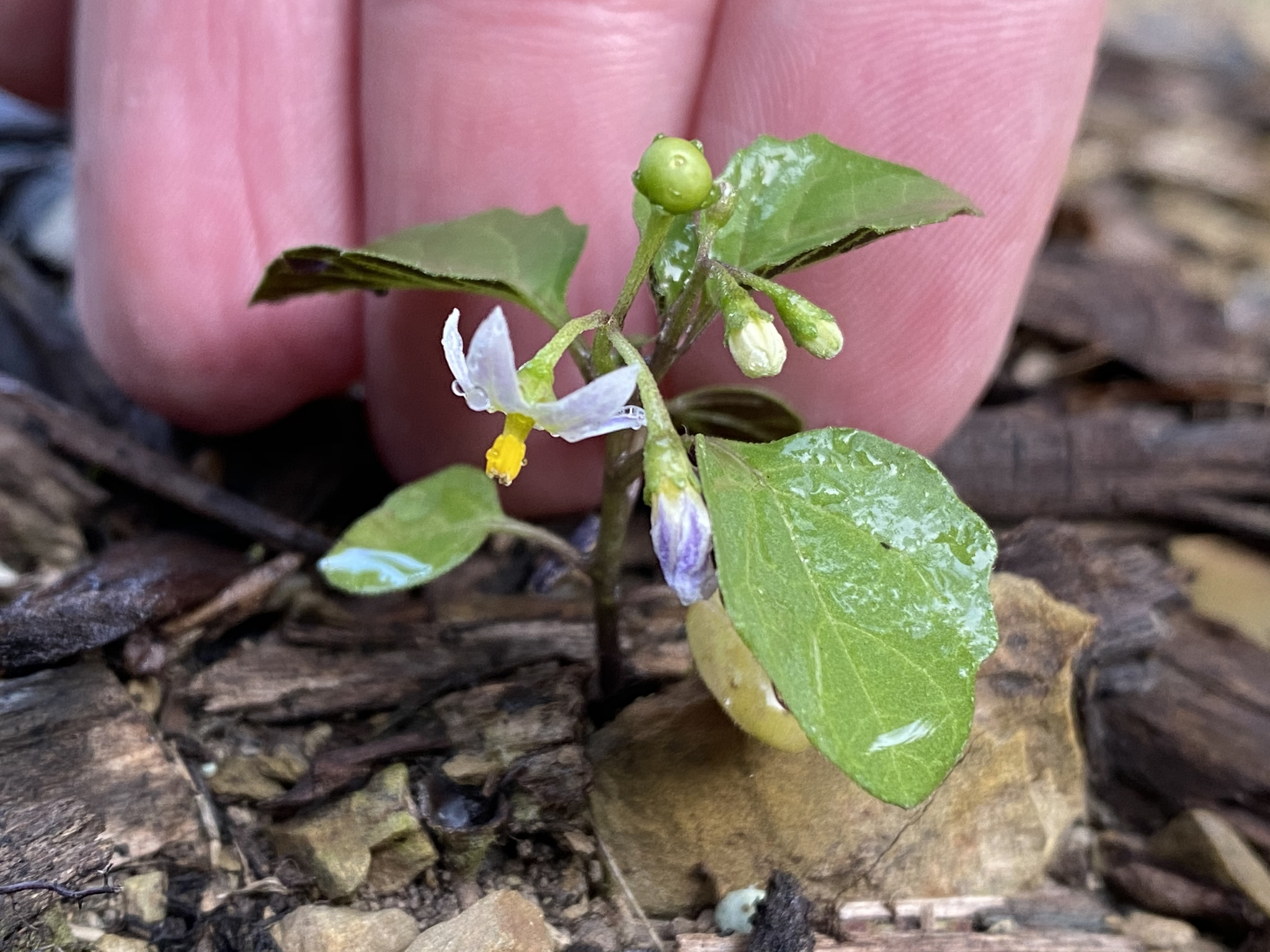

Scientific classification
- Kingdom: Plantae
- Clade: Tracheophytes
- Clade: Angiosperms
- Clade: Eudicots
- Clade: Asterids
- Order: Solanales
- Family: Solanaceae
- Genus: Solanum
- Species: S. emulans

Binomial name
- Solanum emulans Raf.

Synonyms
- List: Solanum adventitium Polg.; Solanum dillenianum Polgar; Solanum heterogonum Dunal; Solanum nigrum var. virginicum L.; Solanum pterocaulon var. heterogonum Dunal

= Solanum emulans =

Species of plant

Solanum emulans, commonly known as eastern black nightshade, is a species of flowering plant in the family Solanaceae. It is native to all Canadian provinces (except British Columbia) and nearly all of the United States (except the Pacific coast states and Nevada), and it has been introduced to scattered locales in Europe. There have been considerable taxonomic difficulties associated with this widespread taxon and its relatives Solanum americanum, S. nigrum, and S. villosum, all of which are in the subsection Solanum of the genus Solanum.
