= Solanum nitidibaccatum =

- In Austria

Scientific classification
- Kingdom: Plantae
- Clade: Tracheophytes
- Clade: Angiosperms
- Clade: Eudicots
- Clade: Asterids
- Order: Solanales
- Family: Solanaceae
- Genus: Solanum
- Species: S. nitidibaccatum

Binomial name
- Solanum nitidibaccatum Bitter

Synonyms
- Solanum physalifolium var. nitidibaccatum (Bitter) Edmonds; Bosleria nevadensis A.Nelson; Solanum nigrum var. frutescens Macloskie; Solanum nitidibaccatum f. integrifolium C.H.Blom; Solanum patagonicum C.V.Morton; Solanum stylesianum Dunal

Species of nightshade

Solanum nitidibaccatum, known as green nightshade, is a species of flowering plant in the nightshade family, Solanaceae. It is an annual native to Argentina, central and southern Chile, Bolivia, and Peru in South America.

It has previously been considered a variety of Solanum physalifolium.
