= Charles-Louis-Félix Franchot =

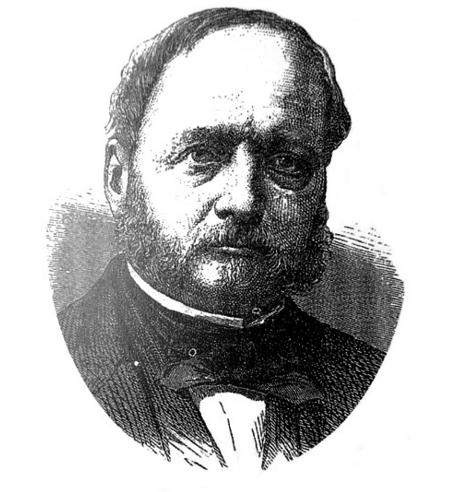
- Born: September 16, 1809; Saint-Venant
- Died: July 31, 1881 (aged 71); Ancerville
- Occupations: Tax officer Inventor

Charles-Louis-Félix Franchot (English: /frænˈʃoʊ/, French: [ʃaʁl lwi feliks fʁɑ̃ʃo]; 16 September 1809, Saint- Venant - 31 July 1881, Ancerville) was a French designer, inventor, and mechanical engineer. He worked as a tax officer and built his own inventions.

== Biography ==
His father fought in the revolutionary, and then Napoleonic armies and ended his career with the rank of lieutenant colonel. He was made officer of the legion of honor (1807) and received the title of baron of the Empire. His mother was Marie Dieudonne Wallart de Maranville.

In 1840, he started to work as a mechanic.

He invented a hot air machine (presented at the Academy of Sciences which abstains, however, from reporting on the invention) that, according to some scientists, best meets the Carnot cycle. Around 10 years after the Stirling engine, Franchot re-invented the regenerator (he called it the "Calefactor") without knowing the existence of Stirling's invention.

In 1836, he filed a patent for his Moderator lamp. The lamp had the advantage of simplicity in its mechanism when compared to other pump operated lamps designed in the 1820s. It became a cheap and popular oil lamp. The lamp was produced by the lamp manufacturers JAC (39, rue du Faubourg Saint-Martin) and Hadrot (rue des Fossés-Montmartre).

A patent dispute later arose with the brothers Levavasseur who claimed to have created the lamp design. The patent judges ruled in 1845 against Franchot.

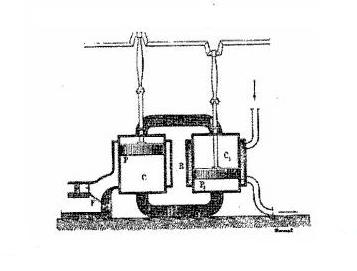
Nineteenth century diagram of Francholet's hot air engine.

In 1854 he invented a hot air engine similar to the earlier Stirling engine but with two double acting cylinders which minimized thermal loses.

He died unmarried at Ancerville in 1881, aged 71. Six years later, at the request of his will, his remains were re-interred on his former estate at Franchot ponds. His grave is marked by an oak tree planted at that time and is surrounded by wrought iron railings. There is an enameled plate with his portrait and an inscription.

== Honors ==
- 1855: Knight of the Legion of Honour
