= Alternaria black spot of canola =

Fungal plant disease

Alternaria black spot of canola or grey leaf spot is an ascomycete fungal disease caused by a group of pathogens including: Alternaria brassicae, A. alternata and A. raphani. This pathogen is characterized by dark, sunken lesions of various size on all parts of the plant, including the leaves, stem, and pods. Its primary economic host is canola. In its early stages it only affects the plants slightly by reducing photosynthesis, however as the plant matures it can cause damage to the seeds and more, reducing oil yield as well.

== Host and symptoms ==
The major canola species that are susceptible to Alternaria black spot include Brassica rapa and Brassica napus (which are modified forms of rapeseed or brown mustard). The Canola Council of Canada has reported that B. rapa is more susceptible to the disease than B. napus, because the latter has leaf wax, which provides more tolerance to black spot disease.

There are no macroscopic signs of the pathogen, however conidia and fungal hyphae can be observed microscopically inside lesions. Symptoms can be observed at every stage of the life cycle and on almost every part of the plant, including in the seedling stage on cotyledons and in later growth stages on leaves, leaf petiole, stem, flowers, pods and seeds. A characteristic symptom of the pathogen is the name itself: black spots. Brown, black or dark grey lesions, surrounded by a yellow halo can be observed on lower leaves during the beginning stages of infection and can vary in size from 1 to 20mm. Lesions can combine to cause leaf death and premature defoliation. These lesions can vary in size and color, and can rapidly spread to upper leaves, stems, and pods in favorable conditions. Infected pods will show dark, sunken lesions. If the lesion is large enough to infect the pod early in the season, they may fail to fully develop, and drop to the ground. Severely spotted pods dry, shrink, and may split open prematurely, causing the shrunken, discolored seeds inside to drop to the ground. Infection of the pods is the most economically concerning symptom of Alternaria black spot, because this is the part of the plant where the oil is produced.

== Environment ==
Alternaria black spot of canola can be found all over the world, but it is most prevalent in mild, humid climates. The prevalence of the disease varies from year to year based on fluctuations in temperature and moisture, especially during host podding and maturity. Periods of hot, dry conditions will interrupt epidemics, while frequent rains or dews and temperatures near 20 °C favor epidemics. Alternaria spp. require 95% relative humidity and temperature between 15 °C to 20 °C for conidial germination.

== Disease cycle ==
Alternaria black spot is a polycyclic disease. Spring infections begin with either infected seed or spores that survived in crop residues or from cruciferous weeds. Common cruciferous weeds are members of the mustard family. In the spring, initial spores can persist in the environment and survive without a host, until conditions are favorable for infection. Conidia spores can be dispersed by rain splash or wind. Once there is enough moisture, they will germinate, penetrate into the plant and cause the black lesions. These spots on the leaves can then continue to produce more inoculum in the form of conidia. This secondary inoculum can then infect nearby plants or the same plant again. The cycle will keep occurring as long as conditions are favorable. Seeds can become infected if lesions develop on the pod, or spores can mechanically infect seeds in the combine during harvest.

When a spore lands on plant tissue, it infects via an appresorium and infection peg that directly penetrates the leaf. This process takes only one to five days; if it has not penetrated the host by then, it will likely not at all. The pathogen can also enter through a wound or natural opening if the opportunity is available.

== Management ==
Unless nearby farms are vigilant about rotating and sanitation, crop rotations are not as effective with Alternaria black spot due to the traveling ability of the spores. Burying crop residues that could release spores has proven to be helpful, however if even 10% of crop residues are left above ground, this is still enough to cause an outbreak. There are currently no resistant varieties of canola; however, some are more tolerant than others. B. napus varieties have been shown to be less susceptible than others, because they have more leaf wax.

Swathing as opposed to straight combining has been shown to be an effective method for reducing the level of infection in the seed. This is especially important in seed production of canola Swathing is the method of cutting the crop but leaving it on top of the stubble left in the field. This allows it to dry faster in the field before harvest, as opposed to direct harvest and storage.

Starting with clean seed is also an important factor in preventing infection. Even if fungicides can prevent disease from infected seed, the infected seed will most likely have reduced vigor. There are registered seed treatments in some countries, however fungicide seed treatments alone often cannot prevent infection of a field, as inoculum can overwinter in debris as well. Spray fungicides applied at 95% flowering have been shown to decrease economic losses due to the pathogen. Fungicides in combination with an integrated pest management plan has been shown to be the most effective method of management.

== Importance ==
Global production of canola has risen from the sixth largest to the second largest oil crop in the world. It is also the second largest feed meal after soybean meal. Black spot of canola can cause substantial yield reductions of up to 36%. The greatest yield loss from Alternaria black spot comes from pod shatter. Pod shatter results from uneven drying of the disease-infected pods causing them to split, particularly under dry, windy conditions in the swath. This disease also reduces seed quality by increasing the green seed count (seeds not at full maturity), reducing seed weight, decreasing protein of seed, and decreasing the percent germination in harvested seed. An increased green seed count can lead to reduced oil content, which is concerning as the seed oil is where canola holds its value as a crop.
