= Argand lamp =

Oil lamp with a gravity feed

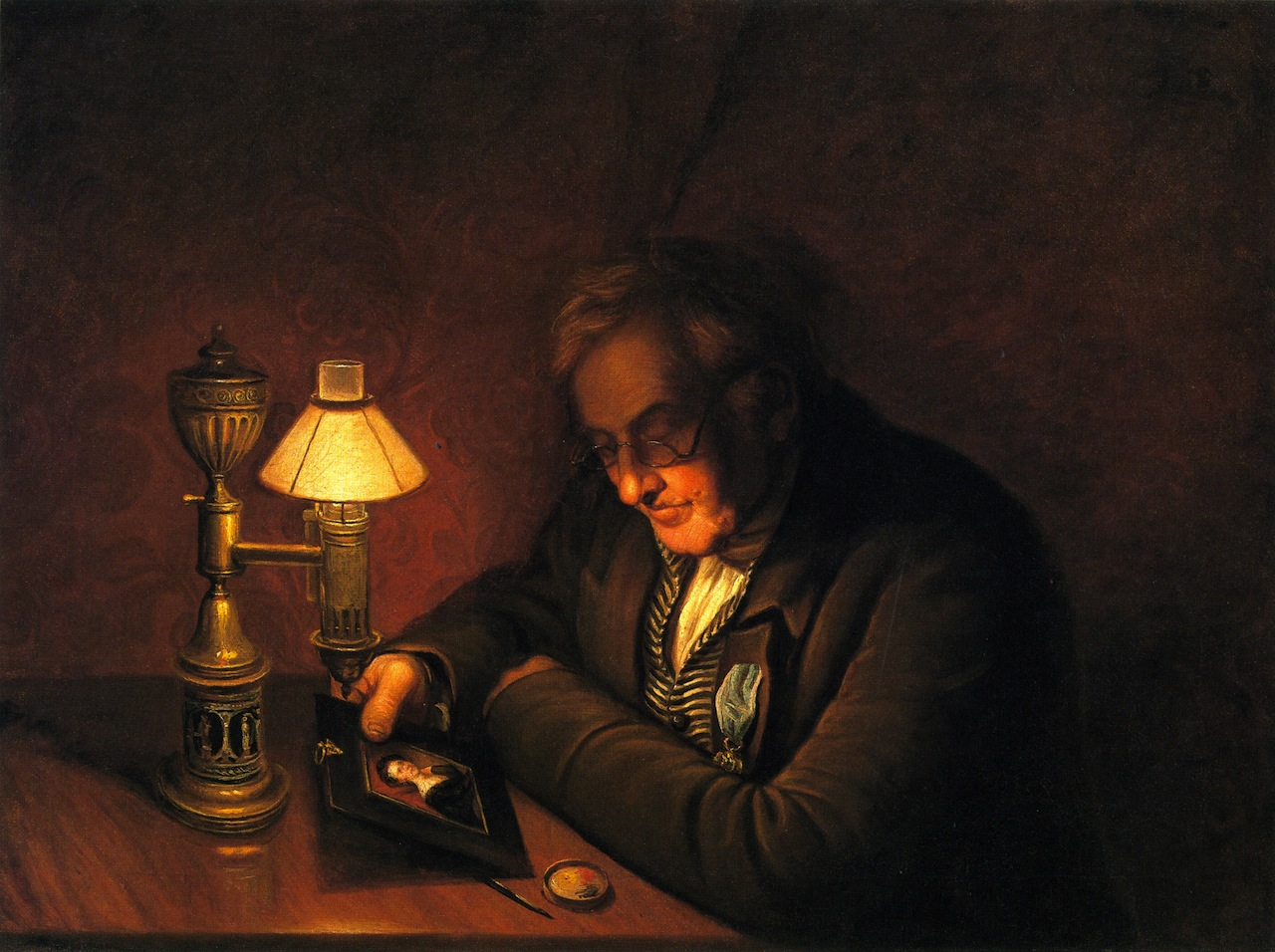
An Argand lamp in use in A Portrait of James Peale, done in 1822 by Charles Willson Peale

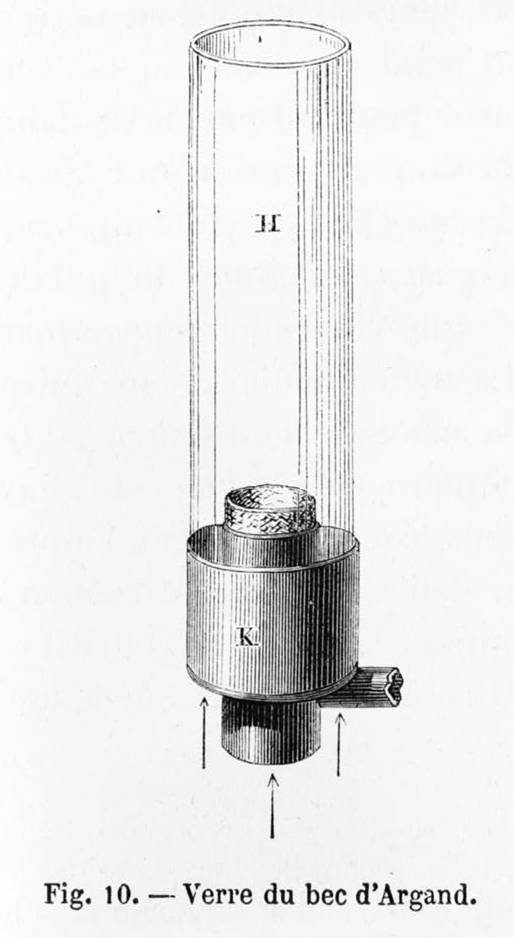
Argand lamp with circular wick and glass chimney. Illustration from Les Merveilles de la science (1867–1869) by Louis Figuier.

The Argand lamp is a type of oil lamp invented in 1780 by Aimé Argand. Its output is 6 to 10 candelas, brighter than that of earlier lamps. Its more complete combustion of the candle wick and oil than in other lamps required much less frequent trimming of the wick.

In France, the lamp is called "Quinquet", after Antoine-Arnoult Quinquet, a pharmacist in Paris, who used the idea originated by Argand and popularized it in France. Quinquet sometimes is credited with the addition of the glass chimney to the lamp.

== Design ==
The Argand lamp had a sleeve-shaped wick mounted so that air can pass both through the center of the wick and also around the outside of the wick before being drawn into a cylindrical chimney which steadies the flame and improves the flow of air. Early models used ground glass which was sometimes tinted around the wick.

An Argand lamp used whale oil, seal oil, colza, olive oil or other vegetable oil as fuel which was supplied by a gravity feed from a reservoir mounted above the burner.

A disadvantage of the original Argand arrangement was that the oil reservoir needed to be above the level of the burner because the heavy, sticky vegetable oil would not rise far up the wick. This made the lamps top heavy and cast a shadow in one direction away from the lamp's flame. The Carcel lamp of 1800, which used a clockwork pump to allow the reservoir to sit beneath the burner, and Franchot's spring-driven Moderator lamp of 1836 avoided these problems.

The same principle was also used for cooking and boiling water due to its 'affording much the strongest heat without smoke'.

== History ==
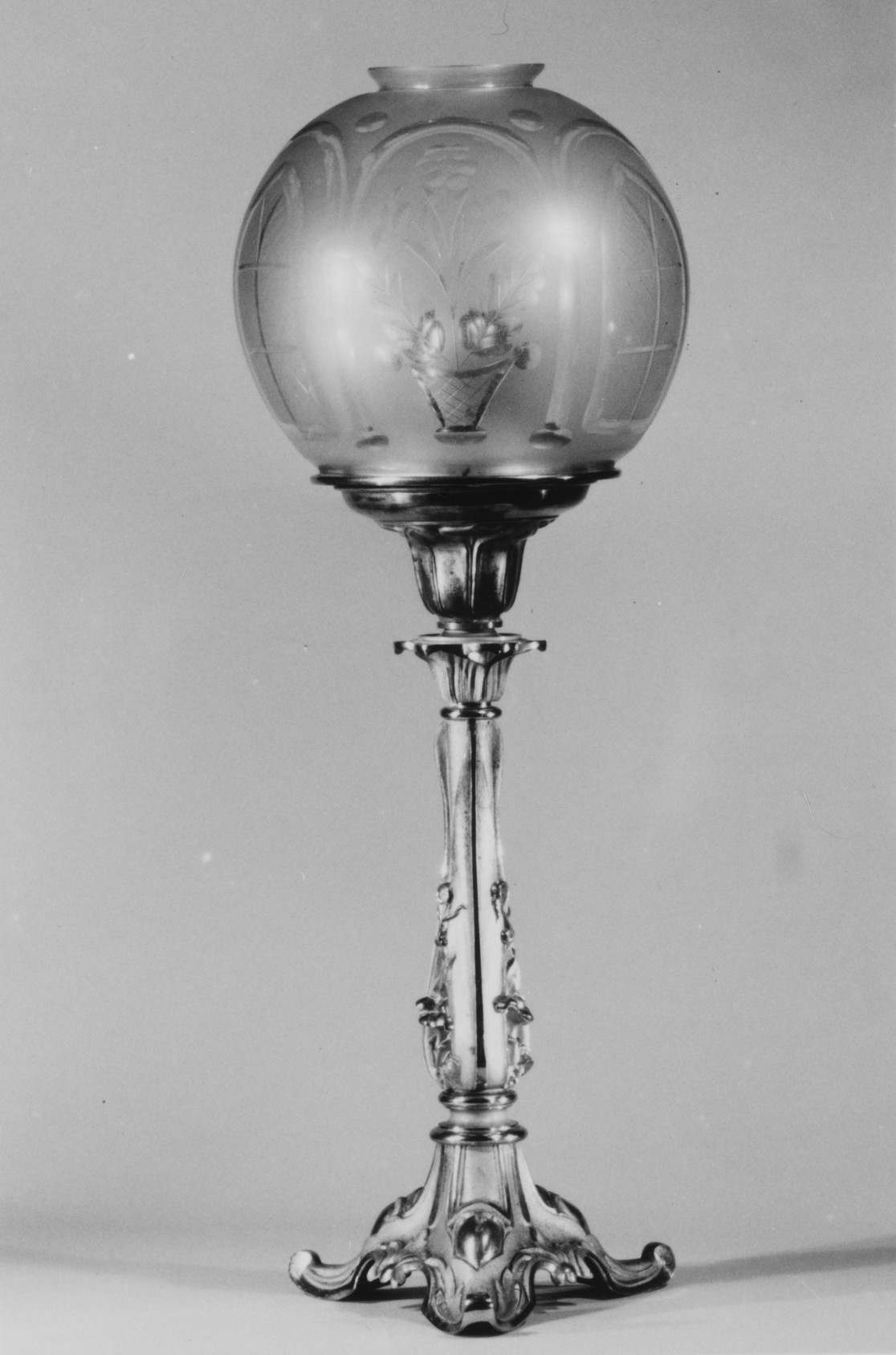
An astral lamp, an Argand lamp designed so that the reservoir does not cast a separate shadow

The Argand lamp was introduced to Thomas Jefferson in Paris in 1784 and according to him gave off "a light equal to six or eight candles."

These new lamps, much more complex and costly than the previous primitive oil lamps, were first adopted by the wealthy, but soon spread to the middle classes and eventually the less well-off as well. Argand lamps were manufactured in a great variety of decorative forms and quickly became popular in America. They were much used as theatrical footlights.

It was the lamp of choice until about 1850 when kerosene lamps were introduced. Kerosene was cheaper than vegetable oil, it produced a whiter flame, and as a liquid of low viscosity it could easily travel up a wick eliminating the need for complicated mechanisms to feed the fuel to the burner.

== See also ==
- Bude-Light: a very bright vegetable oil lamp that works by introducing oxygen into the center of an Argand burner.
- Lewis lamp
