= African nightshade =

Name for several species of flowering plant

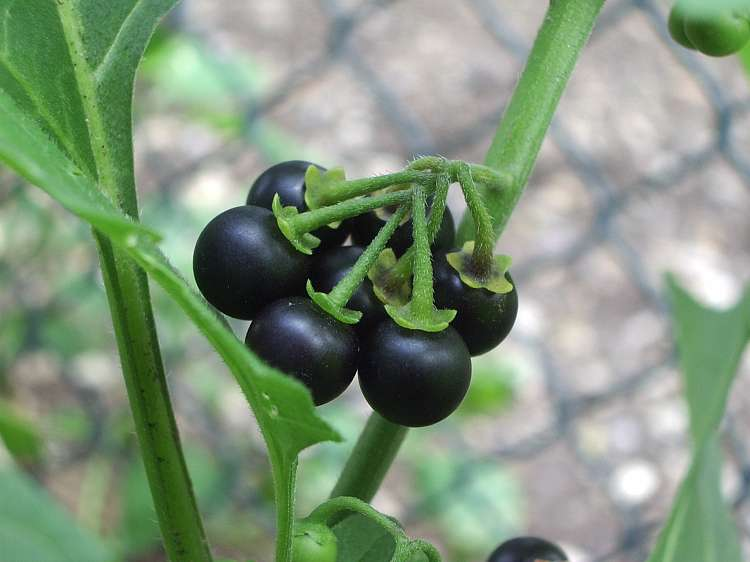
Black nightshade (Solanum nigrum) berries

African nightshades are several species of plants in the section Solanum of the genus Solanum that are commonly consumed as leafy vegetables and herbs. African nightshades are grown in both high and lowland areas in West and East Africa, particularly in Nigeria and Cameroon.The Nso people call it Nyuuseji, and the Kom people call it Mbasi. There is a large variation in diversity of the African nightshades, which have many nutritional and medicinal benefits, even though the family of nightshade is commonly known as comprising dangerous weeds or poisonous plants. Species known as African nightshade include Solanum scabrum, Solanum villosum, Solanum nigrum, and Solanum americanum. Other common names for African nightshade are Black nightshade and Narrow-leaved nightshade. Local names of African nightshade include managu (Kikuyu), mnavu (Swahili), rinagu (Kisii), tsisutsa (Luhya), osuga (Luo), isoiyot (Kipsigis), kitulu (Kamba), ormomoi (Maa), ndunda (Taita), nsugga (Luganda), sochot (Keiyo), and esisogho (Lukhonzo).

== Description ==
African nightshade is an erect dicot with many branches, growing 0.5 to 1.0 m (1 ft 8 in to 3 ft 3 in) high. The plant has thin, oval leaves which are about 15 cm (6 in) in length and purplish in colour. The plant has numerous flowers that are black or purple and round berries, which are about 0.75 cm (0.30 in) in diameter, having small, flat, yellowish seeds. The berries of this plant can be black or orange, depending on the species. There are many diversities in African nightshades related to growth patterns, leaf sizes, tastes (bitterness) flowering time, colour, as well as nutritional and nutraceutical value, along with quantities and composition of anti-nutrient factors.

== History, geography, ethnography ==
The origin of the majority of Solanum species is within South America. The most popular African representatives of Solanum can also be found in areas of Europe and Asia, but the most valued nightshade species vegetable, said to be S. scabrum, is native to Australia. African nightshade is largely domesticated in Nigeria, but also popular in Kenya. African nightshade has historically been known as "food for the poor" by the middle class of areas like Kenya. Traditionally, African nightshade was collected from the wild and given as a souvenir by family and friends, who were traveling from rural areas to town dwellers. Due to promotion by NGOs and research and other interest groups, this trend has changed based on awareness of nutritional and medicinal benefits. African nightshade has become a domesticated and commercialized production from commercial and substance farming.

== Growing conditions ==
African nightshade is propagated from seeds. It performs well in a varying degree of climatic conditions, but grows best within cool, high-moisture environments in both medium and high altitudes. Shady conditions cause a reduction in total plant weight, as well as leaf yield. Though African nightshade can tolerate shade, growth is better when the plant is exposed to full sunlight. For adequate growth of African nightshades, and annual rainfall of approximately 500–1,200 mm (20–47 in) is necessary. African nightshades grow in a variety of soils but require large amounts of nutrients and are best adjusted to soils with high nitrogen, phosphorus and are rich in organic matter. Nitrogen fertilizer increases leaf yields 1.5–2.5 fold. Sandy loam to friable clay soils with a pH of 6.0–6.5 are appropriate.

Though African nightshades are not drought tolerant, procedures can be done to help retain moisture such as mulching with tall grass. Selected breeding can be useful as a method for diversity development, with excellent potential, so long as the variety is preserved and utilized. African nightshade is ready for harvest four weeks past transplanting. Picking is done in weekly intervals and the African nightshade can be sun-dried on banana leaves post-harvest as a means of preservation. Comparing African nightshade to other high-value and high-yielding horticultural crops, it produces low leaf yields and is considered uneconomical, however it is in high demand in some areas for its health, nutritional, and medicinal benefits.

== Pests and diseases ==
Pests and diseases of African nightshade are similar to those of family Solanaceae and include aphids, spider mites, and early blight. Aphids feed by sucking plant sap, causing the leaves to curl, which is unattractive to customers, as well as a chance of drying out or death of the plant. Regular monitoring and spot spraying with biopesticides, when necessary, can help reduce infestations. The feeding of spider mites may cause a decrease in plant growth, flowering, and number of berries and seeds. Avoiding particular pyrethroids may help reduce the occurrence of spider mite outbreaks. Overhead irrigation or strong jet wash plants can knock off spider mites and destroy their webs.

== Nutritional information ==
The leaves of African nightshade consist of 87.2 g water, 1.0 mg iron, 4.3 g protein, 38 kcalories, 5.7 g carbohydrates, 1.4 g fibre, 442 mg calcium, 20 mg ascorbic acid, 3660 μg β-Carotene, 75 mg phosphorus, and 0.59 mg riboflavin per 100 g fresh weight. The leaves also contain high levels of vitamin A, B, and C, and phenolics and alkaloids, including cocaine, quinine, nicotine, and morphine. Solanum species like S. macrocarpon, S. scabrum and S. villosum are found in many Kenyan vegetable gardens. A diet incorporating African nightshade is recommended for pregnant or nursing mothers, as it is good for people with iron deficiencies, and malaria patients.

== Uses ==
The leaves of African nightshade are eaten as a cooked vegetable, sometimes mixed with other vegetables. Some varieties have a bitter taste and others have a 'sweet' taste which is generally after they have been boiled and the water has been thrown away. The fresh fruit is also eaten.
