= Ami Argand =

Genevan physicist and chemist

François-Pierre-Amédée Argand
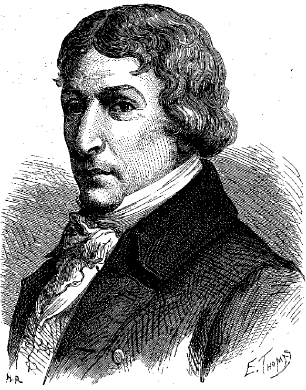
- Born: 5 July 1750; Geneva, Republic of Geneva
- Died: 14 or 24 October 1803 (aged 53); Geneva, France
- Known for: Oil lamp
- Scientific career
- Fields: Chemistry; physics

François-Pierre-Amédée Argand, known as Ami Argand (5 July 1750 – 14 or 24 October 1803) was a Genevan physicist and chemist. He invented the Argand lamp, a great improvement on the traditional oil lamp.

== Early life and education ==
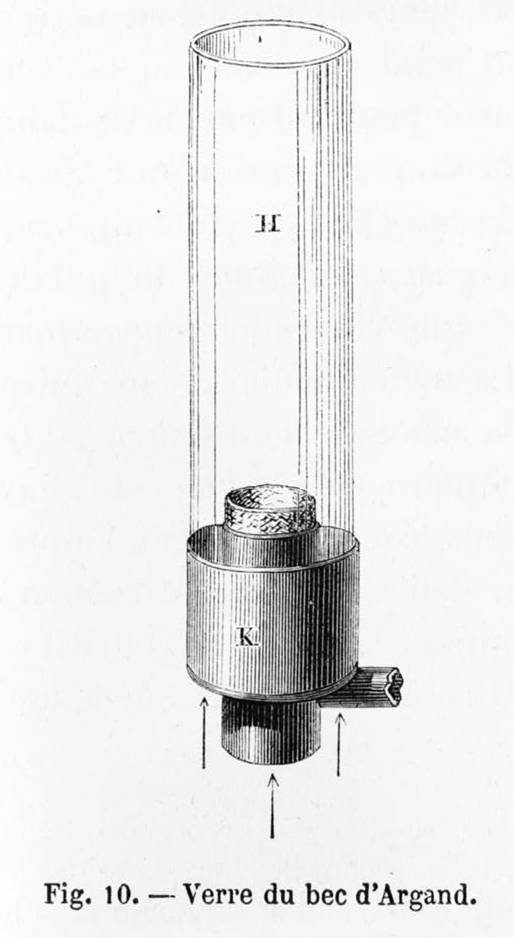
Illustration of the Argand lamp, which appears in Les meirvelles de la science, published in 1867 by Louis Figuier

Francois-Pierre-Amédée Argand was born in Geneva, Republic of Geneva, the ninth of ten children. His father was a watchmaker, who intended for him to enter the clergy. However, he had an aptitude more for science, and became a pupil of the noted botanist and meteorologist Horace-Bénédict de Saussure. He published several scientific papers on meteorological subjects while in Paris in his late twenties. He took a teaching post in chemistry and developed some ideas for improving the distillation of wine into brandy, and, with his brother, successfully built a large distillery.

== Career ==
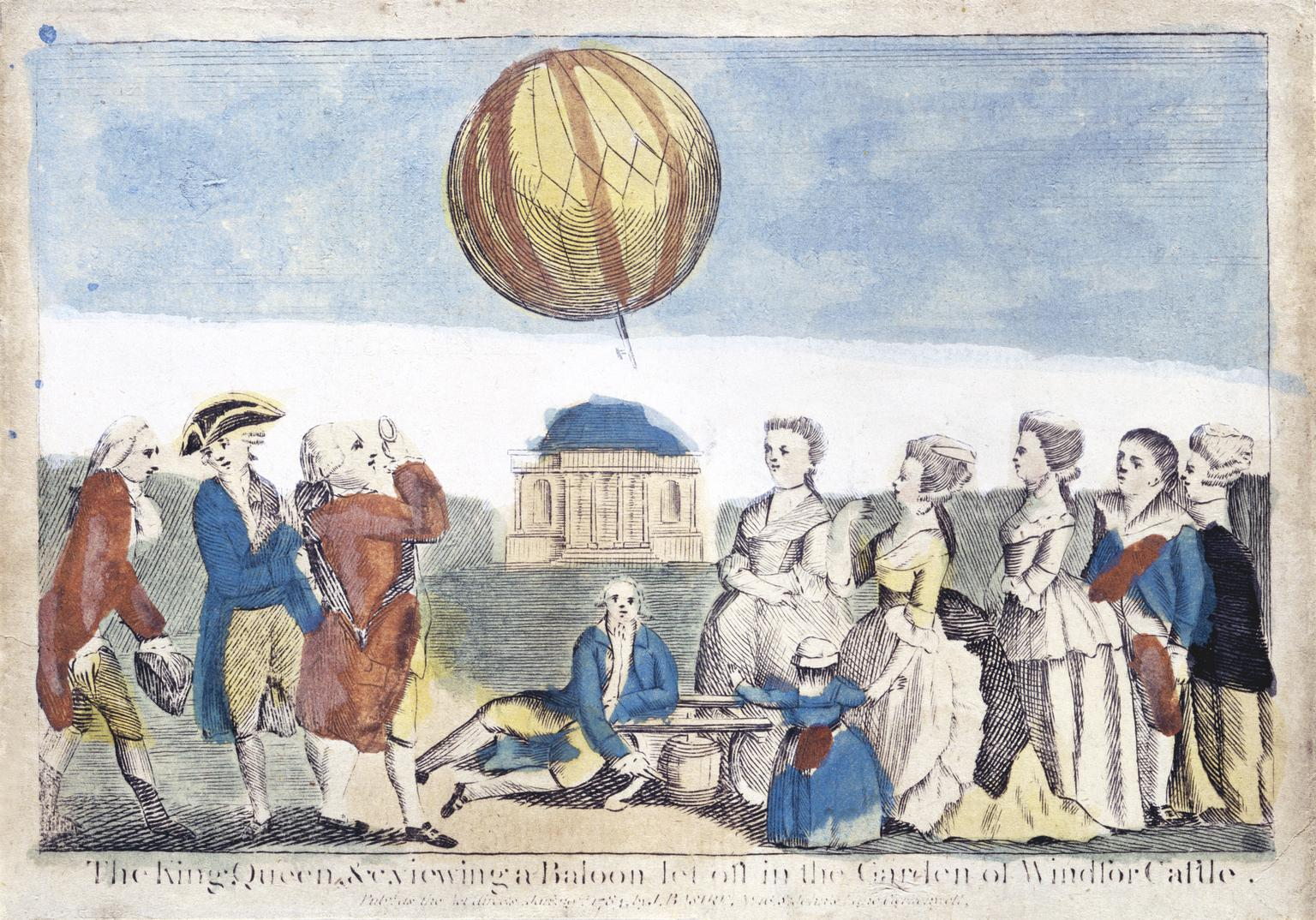
Argand demonstrating his balloon to George III and Queen Charlotte at Windsor Castle on 26 November 1783

During this period, in 1780, he started to invent improvements on the conventional oil lamp. The basic idea was to have a cylindrical wick which air could flow through and around, increasing the intensity of the light produced. A cylindrical chimney enhanced the air flow and a series of experiments gave the proportions for optimum operation. A mechanism for raising and lowering the wick allowed some adjustment and optimization as well. The light was much brighter than a candle (by a factor of five to ten), burned cleanly, and was cheaper than using candles.

In 1783, Argand met Montgolfier brothers Jacques-Étienne and Joseph-Michel in France and became closely involved with his sensational experiments to devise a hot air balloon. When he was there, his acquaintance Antoine-Aroult Quinquet, to whom he had shown an early prototype, began to manufacture the lamps himself, with minor change, and successfully fought a protracted legal battle for patent infringement.

Many problems attended the successful development of a lamp that could be a commercial success. Argand experimented with all of them, searching for practical compromises. The design manufacture of the wick was solved by a lacemaker. The type of glass to use next to the hot flame was a problem eventually solved. All available types of oil to use were tested, and methods to purify them for use were the subject of a number of experiments. Whale oil was eventually settled on, which eventually created an important new industry. The mechanism for holding the wick and moving it up and down went through many variations. Even the solder used to fabricate the oil reservoir was a problem when it was discovered that the soft solder joints leaked. The invention of the lamp did not consist, then, of only one invention, but rather of the improvement and development of a complete system of parts all working together, not unlike Edison's invention of the electrical lighting system that was to again revolutionize lighting over a century later.

In October of the same year, he determined to manufacture his lamp, in England. He eventually formed a partnership with William Parker and Matthew Boulton to manufacture the lamp. In 1784, he received a patent for his design. Argand also formed a close relationship with James Watt who performed some experiments on the lamp's efficiency and advised him on waging his court battles.

The demand for the lamps was high, and the partners had many difficulties at first in manufacturing them, but they eventually became the standard source of illumination in homes and shops. Many imitators and improvers evolved new variations, and thousands of shops sprang up to produce them in the next decades. They were eventually displaced by the kerosene lamp in about 1850.

The invention of the lamp was not, in the end, profitable for Argand.

== Illness and death ==
He contracted malaria and suffered from it for twenty years before dying in Geneva at age 53.
