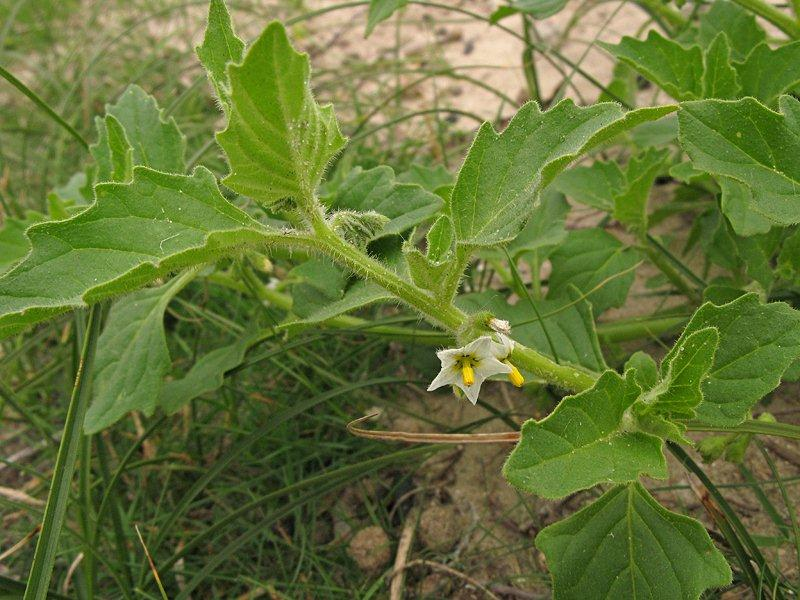
- Naturalized in Belgium

Scientific classification
- Kingdom: Plantae
- Clade: Tracheophytes
- Clade: Angiosperms
- Clade: Eudicots
- Clade: Asterids
- Order: Solanales
- Family: Solanaceae
- Genus: Solanum
- Species: S. physalifolium

Binomial name
- Solanum physalifolium Rusby

Synonyms
- Solanum nitidibaccatum Bitter; Solanum sarachoides auct. non Sendtner [misapplied]; Solanum villosum auct. non (L.) P. Mill. [misapplied]

= Solanum physalifolium =

Species of flowering plant

Solanum physalifolium, known as hoe nightshade, Argentine nightshade, green nightshade and hairy nightshade, is a species in the family Solanaceae (the nightshade family). Native to Argentina, Bolivia and Chile, it is widely naturalized in Australia, New Zealand, Europe, western Canada and the north western United States. Solanum physalifolium has been widely but incorrectly known as Solanum sarrachoides, a different species. It has been listed as a noxious weed in the US states of Kansas and Michigan under this misapplied name.

== Taxonomy ==
Two varieties have been recognized:

- Solanum physalifolium var. nitidibaccatum (Bitter) Edmonds, sometimes considered a separate species, Solanum nitidibaccatum Bitter
- Solanum physalifolium var. physalifolium

== Description ==
Solanum physalifolium is an annual herbaceous plant growing from a taproot. It reaches a height of 10–90 cm (4–35 in). There are no leaves at the base of the stem. The leaves along the stem are ovoid to deltoid (egg-shaped to triangular), 2–8 cm (0.8–3.1 in) long by 1.5–5 cm (0.6–2.0 in) across. The leaf margins are variable and may be toothed, untoothed or wavy. Both the stems and leaves have soft hairs, often somewhat sticky. The flowers are arranged in small clusters and have white to pale blue petals, each 5–10 mm (0.2–0.4 in) wide with lobes that are angled outwards or backwards. The sepals form a cup around the fruit, which is a yellowish globular berry about 6–7 mm (0.2–0.3 in) in diameter.
