= William Parker (glassmaker) =

British glassmaker

William Parker (probably born in the 18th century–1817) was a British glassmaker and inventor.

Based in London, William Parker gained renown for his glass cutting and manufacturing. The foremost chandelier manufacturer of the late 18th century, he provided aristocratic, noble, and royal houses with fine glass chandeliers. The glass chandeliers in the Bath Assembly Rooms are some of his most notable works and are marked "Parker, Fleet Street, London.

Parker also specialized in manufacturing glass for scientific instruments: William Parker and Son, of Fleet Street, London, supplied British chemist Joseph Priestley with lenses and bell jars for many of his experiments, and continued to do so after Priestley’s move to America.

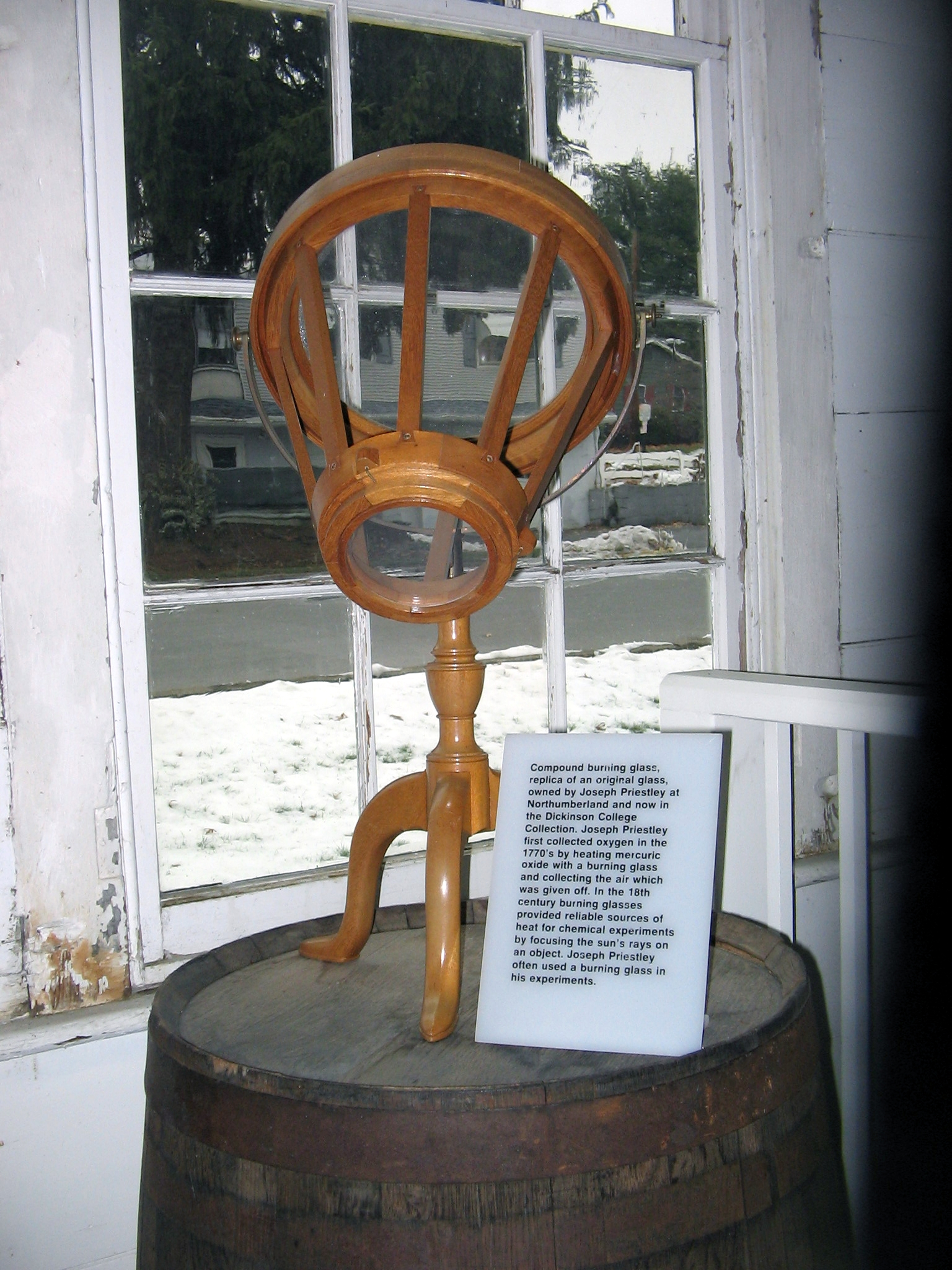
A replica (on a smaller scale) of the burning lens owned by Joseph Priestley, in his laboratory

In 1784, William Parker sent the American Philosophical Society a large burning lens device which could focus the sun's rays, thereby melting or fusing various substances. One year later, he was elected as a member to the society.
