= Broccoli necrotic yellows virus =

Virus classification
- (unranked): Virus
- Realm: Riboviria
- Kingdom: Orthornavirae
- Phylum: Negarnaviricota
- Class: Monjiviricetes
- Order: Mononegavirales
- Family: Rhabdoviridae
- Virus: Broccoli necrotic yellows virus

Synonyms
- Broccoli necrotic yellows cytorhabdovirus

Species of virus

Broccoli necrotic yellows virus (BNYV) is a plant pathogenic virus of the family Rhabdoviridae. The virus was previously assigned to the species Cytorhabdovirus brassicae, but this species was abolished due to lack of sequence data.
