= Carcel lamp =

Oil lamp with a clockwork pump mechanism

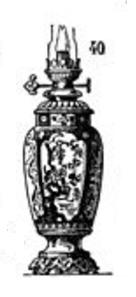
An ornate carcel lamp of the nineteenth century. A clockwork motor in the base pumps a heavy vegetable oil from the vase like reservoir to the burner at the top.

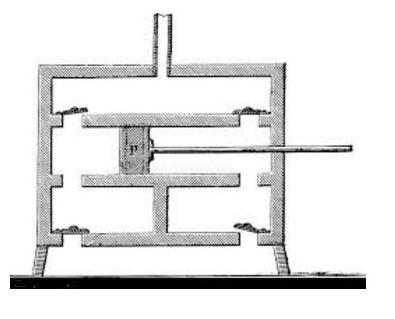
The pump mechanism used to pump lamp oil to the burner in the Carcel lamp of 1800. The pump was immersed in the lamp oil reservoir. The piston was powered by a clockwork motor, which is not shown.

The Carcel lamp was an efficient lighting device used in the nineteenth century for domestic purposes and in France as the standard measure for illumination.

The lamp was invented in 1800 by the French watchmaker Bertrand Guillaume Carcel (1750–1812) to overcome the disadvantages of the Argand-type lamps then in use. The vegetable - mostly colza - oils then available were thick and would not travel far up a wick. The Argand lamps used a gravity feed which meant that the oil reservoir was located above the burner, casting a shadow and making the lamp top heavy. Carcel designed a lamp with the oil reservoir under the burner, in the body of the lamp. To keep the oil moving up to the burner, Carcel housed a clockwork mechanism in the lamp base that drove a small pump submerged in the oil tank. The winding key was located at the bottom of the lamp base.

Another innovative feature was that fuel was pumped into the wick tubes at a greater volume than was necessary for burning so that it overflowed the top of the wicks, thus cooling the burner.

The advantages Carcel claimed for his lamp in his 1800 patent in Paris were that the movement operated unattended, the oil could be used to the last drop, the lamp would stay lit for sixteen hours continuously without refilling, and it provided illumination for several persons at the same time with a single burner.

They were complex devices however, and were expensive and prone to problems in the mechanism. They were most popular in wealthier European cities. Their unpopularity was partially due to the necessity of having to return them to the (mostly European) manufacturers for repair. In 1829 the simpler Moderator lamp was invented, which dispensed with clockwork and used only a weighted piston to move the oil, and this eventually superseded them.

The French physical standard Carcel lamp consisted of a cylindrical Argand burner, and gave the standard brightness when 42 grams of colza oil were consumed per hour. The supply and draught were regulated by clockwork.

== See also ==
- List of obsolete units of measurement
