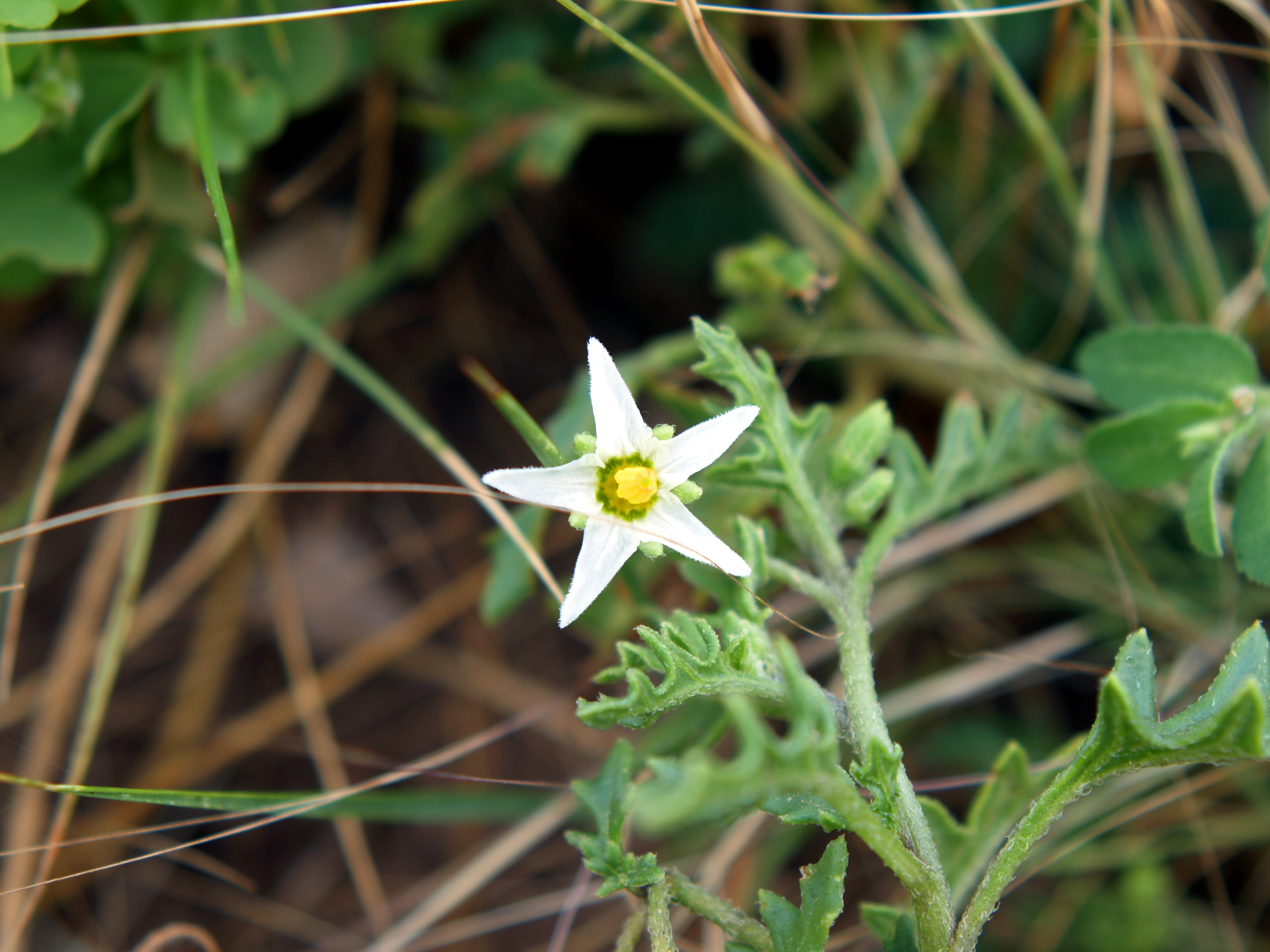

Scientific classification
- Kingdom: Plantae
- Clade: Tracheophytes
- Clade: Angiosperms
- Clade: Eudicots
- Clade: Asterids
- Order: Solanales
- Family: Solanaceae
- Genus: Solanum
- Species: S. sarrachoides

Binomial name
- Solanum sarrachoides Sendtn.

= Solanum sarrachoides =

Species of nightshade plant

Solanum sarrachoides is a species of South American nightshade known as the hairy nightshade or leafy-fruited nightshade.

The scientific name Solanum sarrachoides was long misused for a different species, Solanum physalifolium, by various authors. The original misidentified S. sarrachoides were held to be the variety S. physalifolium var. nitidibaccatum (also treated as distinct species, Solanum nitidibaccatum). The actual S. sarrachoides was also considered a variety of S. tweedianum, under this plant's obsolete name S. atriplicifolium, as established by Gilli based on Nees.

S. sarrachoides occurs as an introduced species in the Southeastern United States and many other parts of the world.
