= Rapeseed oil =

Type of vegetable oil

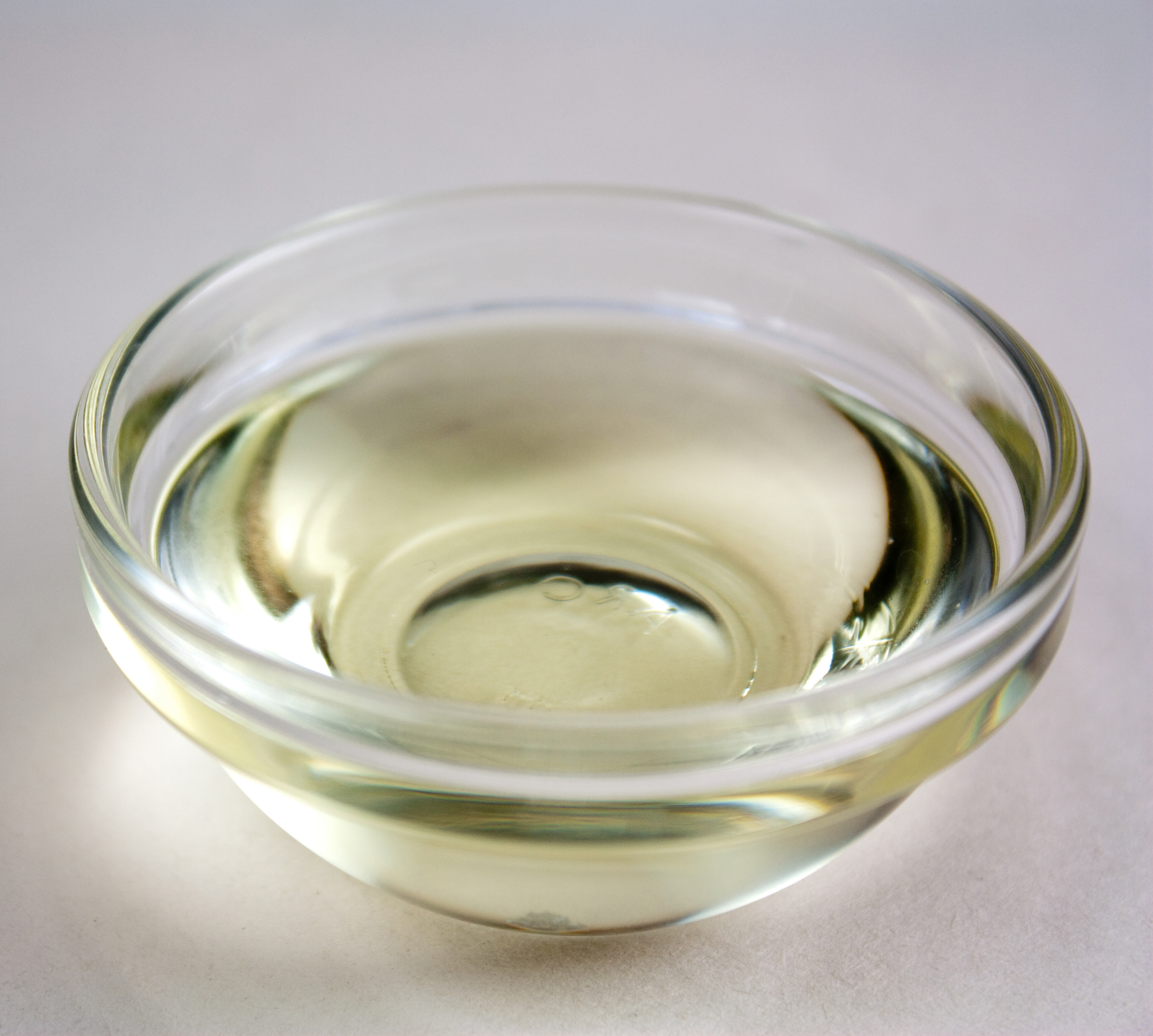
Canola oil

Rapeseed oil is one of the oldest known vegetable oils. There are both edible and industrial forms produced from rapeseed, the seed of several cultivars of the plant family Brassicaceae (mustards). The term "rapeseed" applies to oilseeds from the species Brassica napus and Brassica rapa, while the term canola refers to specific rapeseed varieties bred to produce oil for use in human and animal foods. Canola refers to a cultivar developed by Canadian researchers in the mid 1970s. In manufacturing, the edible varieties of canola are required to contain less than 2% erucic acid in Canada, the United States, European Union, and many other countries.

Canola is produced as low erucic acid rapeseed (LEAR) oil and is generally recognized as safe (GRAS) by the United States Food and Drug Administration (FDA).

In commerce, non-food varieties are typically called colza oil. In 2022, Canada, Germany, China, and India were the leading producers of rapeseed oil, accounting together for 41% of the world total.

== History ==
The name for rapeseed comes from the Latin word rapum meaning turnip. Turnip, rutabaga (swede), cabbage, Brussels sprouts, and mustard are related to rapeseed. Rapeseed belongs to the genus Brassica. Brassica oilseed varieties are some of the oldest plants cultivated, with documentation of its use tracing back to India 4,000 years ago, and use in China and Japan 2,000 years ago. Its use in Northern Europe for oil lamps is documented to have started in the 13th century. Rapeseed oil extracts were first put on the market in 1956–1957 as food products, but these had several unacceptable properties. That form of rapeseed oil had a distinctive taste and a greenish colour due to the presence of chlorophyll, and still contained a higher concentration of erucic acid.

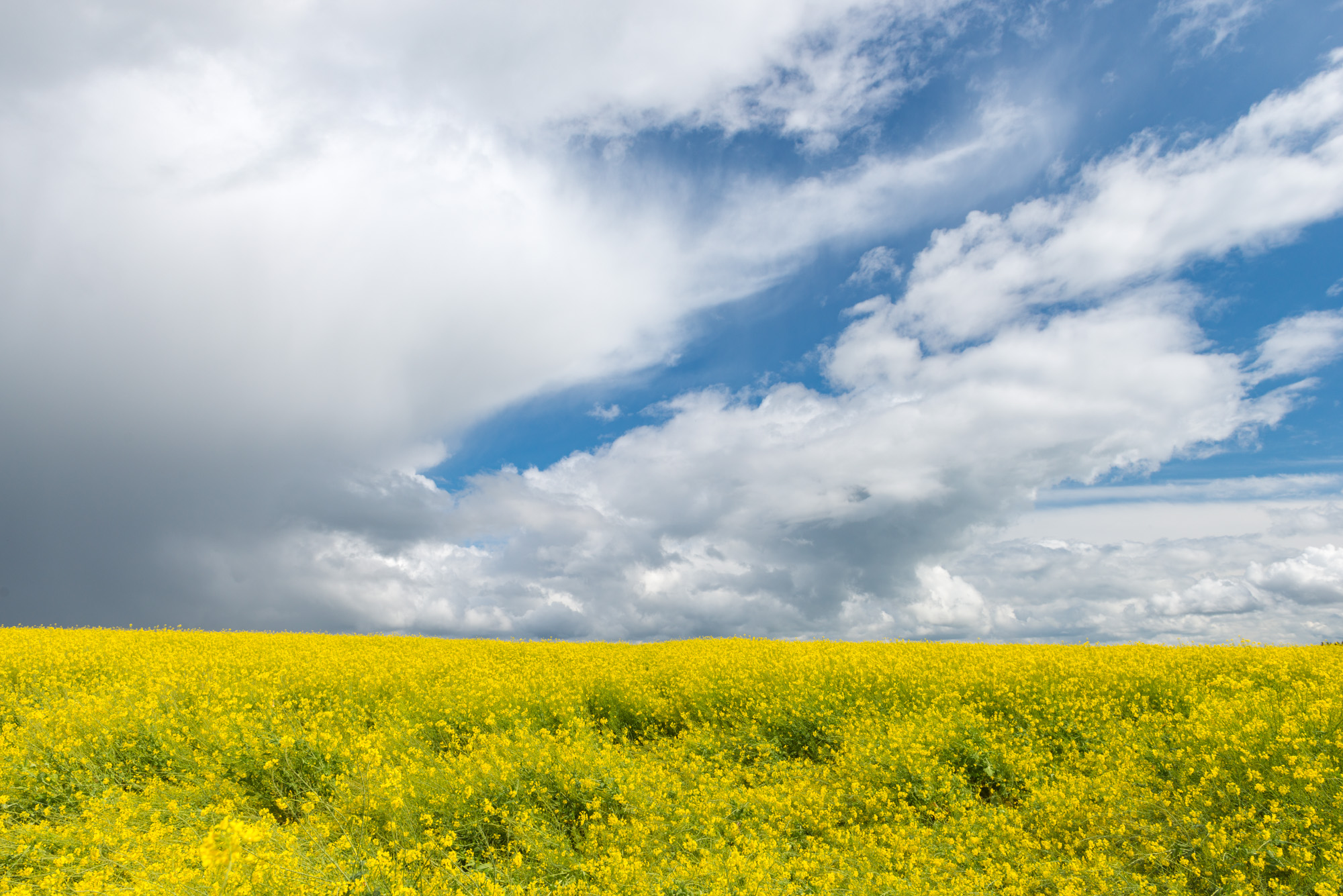
Canola field

Canola was bred from rapeseed cultivars of B. napus and B. rapa at the University of Manitoba in the early 1970s to contain much less erucic acid. This work was performed at the National Research Council of Canada laboratories in Saskatoon using gas liquid chromatography. Canola was originally a trademark name of the Rapeseed Association of Canada; the name is a portmanteau of "can" from Canada and "ola" referring to "oil", and avoids the negative associations with the unrelated term rape. Canola is now a generic term for edible varieties of rapeseed oil in North America and Australasia; the change in name also serves to distinguish it from natural rapeseed oil, which has much higher erucic acid content.

A genetically engineered rapeseed that is tolerant to the herbicide Roundup (glyphosate) was first introduced to Canada in 1995 (Roundup Ready). A genetically modified variety developed in 1998 is considered to be the most disease- and drought-resistant canola variety to date. In 2009, 90% of the Canadian crop was herbicide-tolerant. In 2005, 87% of the canola grown in the US was genetically modified. In 2011, out of the 31 million hectares of canola grown worldwide, 8.2 million (26%) were genetically modified.

A 2010 study conducted in North Dakota found glyphosate- or glufosinate-resistance transgenes in 80% of wild natural rapeseed plants, and a few plants that were resistant to both herbicides. This may reduce the effectiveness of the herbicide tolerance trait for weed control over time, as the weed species could also become tolerant to the herbicide. However, transgene prevalence in the wild is unclear; the study only sampled along roadsides and "feral populations could have become established after trucks carrying cultivated GM seeds spilled some of their load during transportation".

Genetically modified canola attracts a price penalty compared to non-GM canola; in Western Australia, it is estimated to be 7.2% on average.

== Production ==
Rapeseed oil production 2023, millions of tonnes
Canada	4.4
China	4.3
Germany	4.2
India	4.1
France	1.9
Russia	1.6
Poland	1.5
World	31.4
Source: FAOSTAT of the United Nations

In 2023, world production of rapeseed oil was 31 million tonnes, led by Canada, China, Germany, and India as the largest producers each with more than four million tonnes, accounting for 54% of the total when combined (table).

Production of rapeseed oil

Per capita production of rapeseed oil

== Production process ==
Canola oil is made at a processing facility. The most common extraction method is slightly heating and then crushing the seed. Almost all commercial canola oil is then extracted using hexane solvent, which is recovered at the end of processing. Finally, the canola oil is refined using water precipitation and organic acid to remove gums and free fatty acids, filtering to remove color, and deodorizing using steam distillation. Cold-pressed and expeller-pressed canola oil are also produced on a more limited basis. Canola vegetable oils certified as organic are required to be from non-GMO rapeseed.

About 44% of a seed is oil, with the remainder as a canola meal used for animal feed. About 23 kg (51 lb) of canola seed makes 10 L (2.64 US gal) of canola oil. The average density of canola oil is 0.92 g/ml (7.7 lb/US gal; 9.2 lb/imp gal).

Canola oil is a key ingredient in many foods. Its reputation as a healthful oil has created high demand in markets around the world, and overall it is the third-most widely consumed vegetable oil, after soybean oil and palm oil.

The oil has many non-food uses and, like soybean oil, is often used interchangeably with non-renewable petroleum-based oils in products. Non-food uses include industrial lubricants, biodiesel, candles, lipsticks, and newspaper inks.

== Nutrition and health ==
Canola oil
Nutritional value per 100 g
- Energy: 3,700 kJ (880 kcal)
- Carbohydrates: 0 g
- Starch: 0 g
- Sugars: 0 g
- Dietary fiber: 0 g
- Fat: 100 g
- Saturated: 7.4 g
- Trans: 0.4 g
- Monounsaturated: 63.3 g
- Polyunsaturated omega−3 omega−6: 28.1 g 9.1 g 18.6 g
- Protein: 0 g
Vitamins and minerals
Vitamins	Quantity %DV^{†}
Vitamin A equiv. beta-Carotene lutein zeaxanthin	0% 0 μg 0% 0 μg 0 μg
Vitamin A	0 IU
Thiamine (B1)	0% 0 mg
Riboflavin (B2)	0% 0 mg
Niacin (B3)	0% 0 mg
Pantothenic acid (B5)	0% 0 mg
Vitamin B6	0% 0 mg
Folate (B9)	0% 0 μg
Vitamin B12	0% 0 μg
Vitamin C	0% 0 mg
Vitamin E	117% 17.5 mg
Vitamin K	59% 71.3 μg
Minerals	Quantity %DV^{†}
Calcium	0% 0 mg
Iron	0% 0 mg
Magnesium	0% 0 mg
Manganese	0% 0 mg
Phosphorus	0% 0 mg
Potassium	0% 0 mg
Sodium	0% 0 mg
Zinc	0% 0 mg
- Other constituents: Quantity
- Water: 0 g
- Full link to USDA FoodData Central entry
- ^{†}Percentages estimated using US recommendations for adults, except for potassium, which is estimated based on expert recommendation from the National Academies.

=== Nutritional content ===
Canola oil is 100% fat, composed of 63% monounsaturated fat, 28% polyunsaturated fat, and 7% saturated fat (table). The ratio of linoleic acid (an omega-6 fatty acid) to alpha-linolenic acid (an omega-3 fatty acid) is 2:1 (table). A 100 g (3.5 oz) reference amount of canola oil provides 880 calories of food energy and is a rich source of vitamin E (117% of the Daily Value, DV) and vitamin K (59% DV) (table).

=== Health research ===
Reviews indicate that consumption of canola oil can reduce blood levels of cholesterol and low-density lipoprotein (LDL) – two risk factors for cardiovascular diseases – and may help reduce body weight.

In 2006, canola oil was given a qualified health claim by the United States Food and Drug Administration for lowering the risk of coronary heart disease, resulting from its significant content of unsaturated fats; the allowed claim for food labels states:

"Limited and not conclusive scientific evidence suggests that eating about 1 1/2 tablespoons (19 grams) of canola oil daily may reduce the risk of coronary heart disease due to the unsaturated fat content in canola oil. To achieve this possible benefit, canola oil is to replace a similar amount of saturated fat and not increase the total number of calories you eat in a day. One serving of this product contains [x] grams of canola oil."

=== Erucic acid ===
Compound	Family	% of total
Oleic acid	ω-9	61%
Linoleic acid	ω-6	21%
Alpha-linolenic acid	ω-3	11% 9%
Saturated fatty acids		7%
Palmitic acid		4%
Stearic acid		2%
Trans fat		0.4%
Erucic acid		0.01% <0.1%

Although wild rapeseed oil contains significant amounts of erucic acid, the cultivars used to produce commercial, food-grade canola oil were bred to contain less than 2% erucic acid, an amount deemed not significant as a health risk. The low-erucic trait was due to two mutations changing the activity of LEA1 and KCS17.

The erucic acid content in canola oil has been reduced over the years. In western Canada, a reduction occurred from the average content of 0.5% between 1987 and 1996 to a current content of 0.01% from 2008 to 2015. Other reports also show a content lower than 0.1% in Australia and Brazil.

To date, no health effects have been associated with dietary consumption of erucic acid by humans; but tests of erucic acid metabolism in other species imply that higher levels may be detrimental. Canola oil produced using genetically modified plants has also not been shown to explicitly produce adverse effects.

Canola oil is generally recognized as safe.

=== Glucosinolates ===
Another chemical change in canola is the reduction of glucosinolates. As the oil is extracted, most of the glucosinolates are concentrated into the seed meal, an otherwise rich source of protein. Livestock have varying levels of tolerance to glucosinolates intake, with some being poisoned relatively easily. A small amount of glucosinolates also enters the oil, imparting a pungent odor.

Further reduction of glucosinolate levels remains important for the use of rapeseed meal in animal feed.

It is not completely clear which genetic changes from plant breeding resulted in the current reduction in this group of chemicals.

Comparison of fats and smoke points among vegetable oils

=== Comparison to other vegetable oils ===
Properties of vegetable oils The nutritional values are expressed as percent (%) by mass of total fat.
Type	Processing treatment	Saturated fatty acids	Monounsaturated fatty acids		Polyunsaturated fatty acids				Smoke point
Type	Processing treatment	Saturated fatty acids	Total	Oleic acid (ω−9)	Total	α-Linolenic acid (ω−3)	Linoleic acid (ω−6)	ω−6:3 ratio	Smoke point
Avocado		11.6	70.6	67.9	13.5	1	12.5	12.5:1	250 °C (482 °F)
Brazil nut		17.6	26.7	26.1	55.7	0.1	55.6	457:1	208 °C (406 °F)
Canola		7.4	63.3	61.8	28.1	9.1	18.6	2:1	204 °C (400 °F)
Coconut		82.5	6.3	6	1.7	0.019	1.68	88:1	175 °C (347 °F)
Corn		12.9	27.6	27.3	54.7	1	58	58:1	232 °C (450 °F)
Cottonseed		25.9	17.8	19	51.9	1	54	54:1	216 °C (420 °F)
Cottonseed	hydrogenated	93.6	1.5		0.6	0.2	0.3	1.5:1	
Flaxseed/linseed		9.0	18.4	18	67.8	53	13	0.2:1	107 °C (225 °F)
Grape seed		9.6	16.1	15.8	69.9	0.10	69.6	very high	216 °C (421 °F)
Hemp seed		7.0	9.0	9.0	82.0	22.0	54.0	2.5:1	166 °C (330 °F)
High-oleic safflower oil		7.5	75.2	75.2	12.8	0	12.8	very high	212 °C (414 °F)
Olive (extra virgin)		13.8	73.0	71.3	10.5	0.7	9.8	14:1	193 °C (380 °F)
Palm		49.3	37.0	40	9.3	0.2	9.1	45.5:1	235 °C (455 °F)
Palm	hydrogenated	88.2	5.7		0				
Peanut		16.2	57.1	55.4	19.9	0.318	19.6	61.6:1	232 °C (450 °F)
Rice bran oil		25	38.4	38.4	36.6	2.2	34.4	15.6:1	232 °C (450 °F)
Sesame		14.2	39.7	39.3	41.7	0.3	41.3	138:1	
Soybean		15.6	22.8	22.6	57.7	7	51	7.3:1	238 °C (460 °F)
Soybean	partially hydrogenated	14.9	43.0	42.5	37.6	2.6	34.9	13.4:1	
Sunflower oil		8.99	63.4	62.9	20.7	0.16	20.5	128:1	227 °C (440 °F)
Walnut oil	unrefined	9.1	22.8	22.2	63.3	10.4	52.9	5:1	160 °C (320 °F)

== Uses ==
B. napus is the source for canola as a high quality vegetable oil for human food products, and as a high-protein pomace to feed fish and farm animals. Canola oil is favored for its culinary qualities, and is used widely as a salad oil, for shortening, margarine, in deep frying, baking, sandwich spreads, and non-dairy creamers.

Apart from its use for human consumption, rapeseed oil is extensively used as a lubricant for machinery, in cosmetics, printing inks, fabrics, plastic products, and pesticides. It was widely used in European domestic lighting before the advent of coal (city) gas or kerosene. It was the preferred oil for train pot lamps, and was used for lighting railway coaches in the United Kingdom before gas lighting, and later electric lighting, were adopted. Burned in a Carcel lamp, it was part of the definition of the French standard measure for illumination, the carcel, for most of the nineteenth century. In lighthouses, such as in early Canada, rapeseed oil was used before the introduction of mineral oil. Rapeseed oil was used with the Argand burner because it was cheaper than whale oil. Rapeseed oil was burned to a limited extent in the Confederacy during the American Civil War.

=== Biodiesel ===
Rapeseed oil is used as diesel fuel, either as biodiesel, straight in heated fuel systems, or blended with petroleum distillates for powering motor vehicles. Biodiesel may be used in pure form in newer engines without engine damage and is frequently combined with fossil-fuel diesel in ratios varying from 2% to 20% biodiesel.

Rapeseed oil is the preferred oil stock for biodiesel production in Europe, Canada, and the United States, partly because rapeseed produces more oil per unit of land area compared to other oil sources, such as soybeans, but primarily because canola oil has a carbon footprint substantially lower than conventional diesel fuel.

=== Other edible rapeseed oils ===
Some less-processed versions of rapeseed oil are used for flavor in some countries. Chinese rapeseed oil was originally extracted from the field mustard. In the 19th century, rapeseed (B. rapa) was introduced by European traders, and local farmers crossed the new plant with field mustard to produce semi-winter rapeseed. Their erucic acid content was reduced to modern "canola" levels by breeding with Canadian low-erucic acid cultivar "ORO". Chinese rapeseed oil has a distinctive taste and a greenish colour due to the different processing method: seeds are roasted and expeller-pressed to obtain the oil. A centrifuge is used to remove solids, followed by a heating step. The resultant oil is heat-stable and fundamental to Sichuan cuisine.

In India, mustard oil is used in cooking. In the United Kingdom and Ireland, some chefs use a "cabbagey"-tasting rapeseed oil processed by cold-pressing.

== Spanish rapeseed poisoning outbreak ==
In 1981, there was an oil poisoning outbreak, later known as toxic oil syndrome that was attributed to people consuming what they thought was olive oil but turned out to be rapeseed oil that had been denatured with 2% aniline (phenylamine). The substance was intended for industrial use but had been illegally refined in an attempt to remove the aniline. It was then fraudulently sold as olive oil, mainly in street markets, mostly in the Madrid area.

== Gallery ==
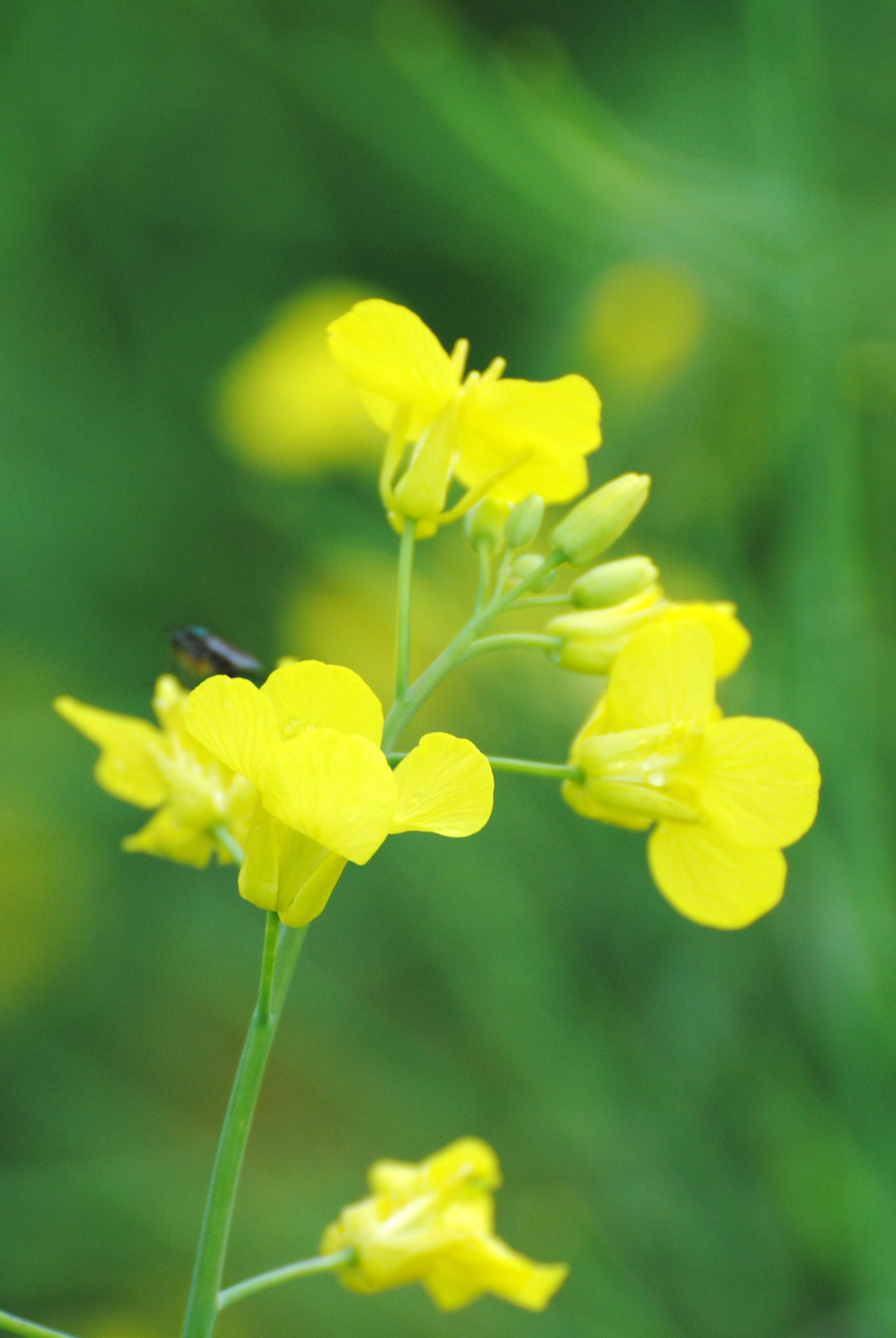
Close-up of canola blooms

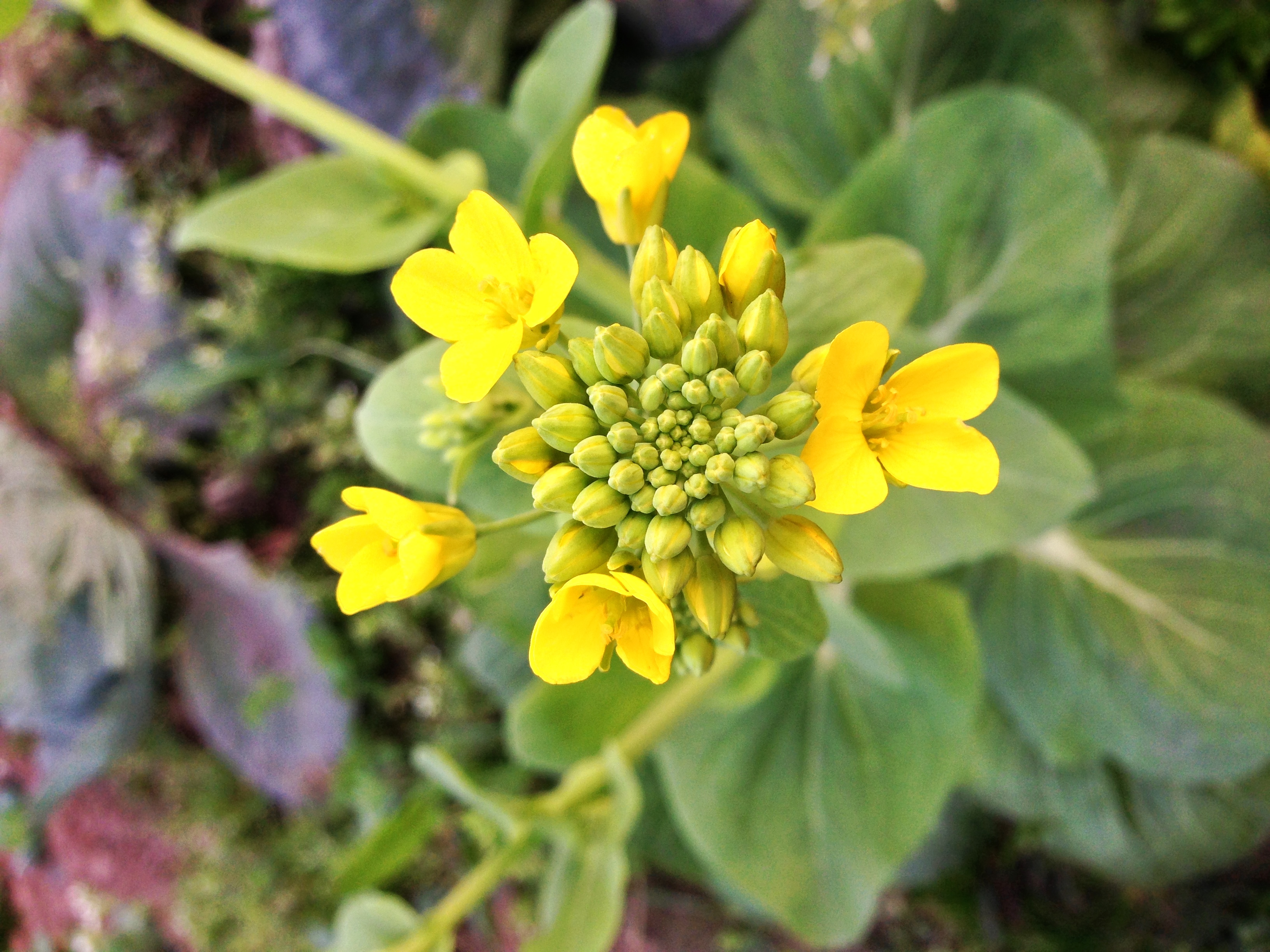
Canola flower

Bottles of rapeseed oil

== See also ==
- Botanol, a flooring material derived from canola oil
- List of canola diseases
- Triangle of U
