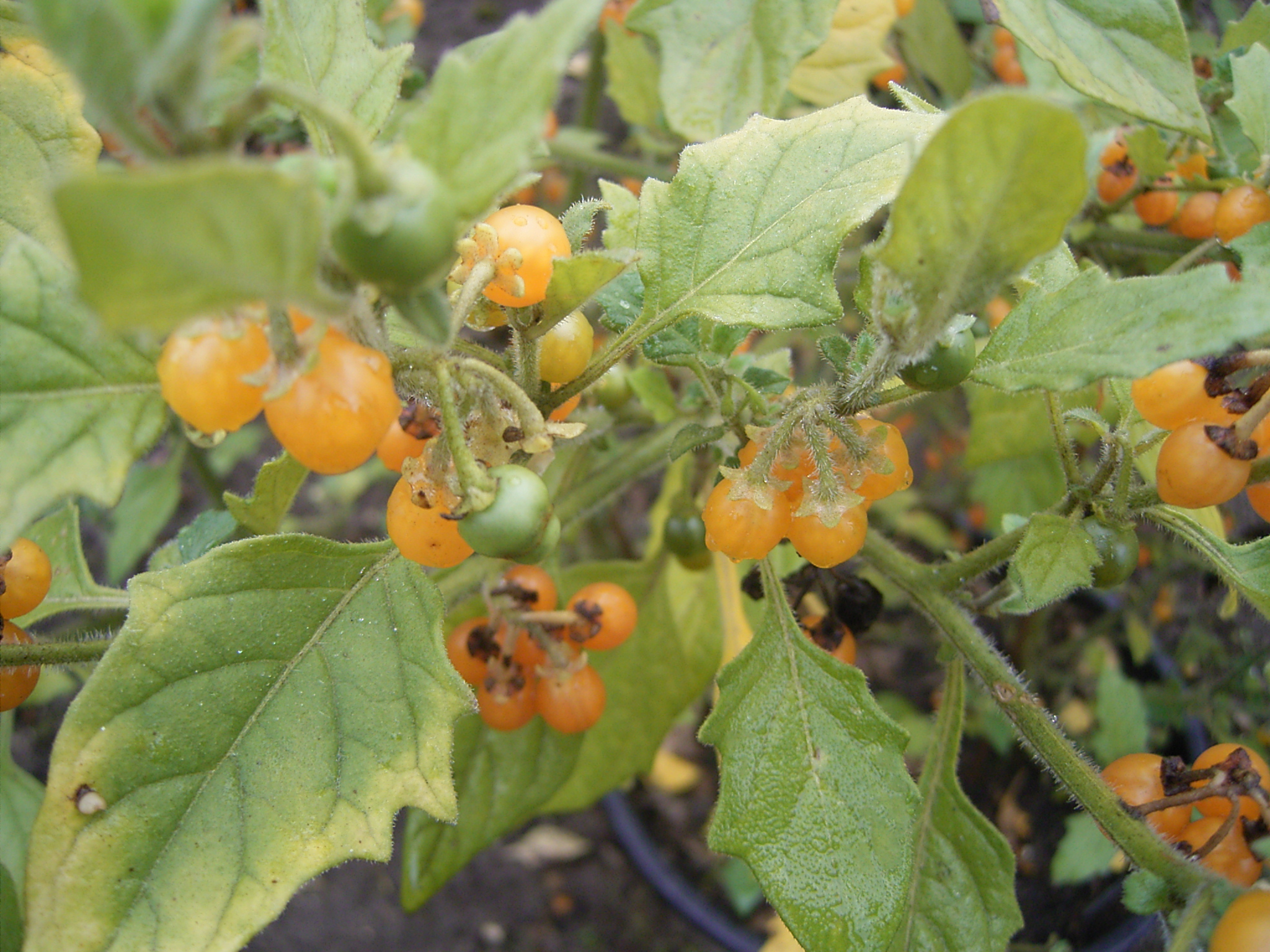

Scientific classification
- Kingdom: Plantae
- Clade: Tracheophytes
- Clade: Angiosperms
- Clade: Eudicots
- Clade: Asterids
- Order: Solanales
- Family: Solanaceae
- Genus: Solanum
- Species: S. villosum

Binomial name
- Solanum villosum Mill.

Synonyms
- List: Solanum luteum subsp. villosum (Mill.) Dostál; Solanum aegyptiacum Forssk.; Solanum alatum Moench; Solanum arenarium Schur; Solanum canescens Kit. ex Kanitz; Solanum carmanicum Schönb.-Tem.; Solanum cerinum Otto; Solanum erythraeum Dunal; Solanum flavum Kit. ex Schult.; Solanum hildebrandtii A.Braun & C.D.Bouché; Solanum humile Bernh. ex Willd.; Solanum incanum Kit. ex Kanitz; Solanum incanum Kit. ex Schult.; Solanum incertum Dunal; Solanum kitaibelii Schult.; Solanum luteovirescens C.C.Gmel.; Solanum luteum Mill.; Solanum miniatum Bernh. ex Willd.; Solanum minutiflorum Dunal; Solanum morella proles alatum (Moench) Rouy & Foucaud; Solanum morella var. flavum (Kit. ex Schult.) Rouy & Foucaud; Solanum morella subsp. luteum (Mill.) Rouy; Solanum morella proles ochroleucum (Bastard) Rouy & Foucaud; Solanum nigrum aegyptiacum Lam. ex C.C.Gmel.; Solanum nigrum subsp. alatum (Moench) Čelak.; Solanum nigrum proles alatum (Moench) Rouy; Solanum nigrum var. alatum (Moench) Fiori; Solanum nigrum f. angulosum Döll; Solanum nigrum var. aurantium Maire; Solanum nigrum var. croceum Neilr.; Solanum nigrum f. glabrum Chiov.; Solanum nigrum var. humile Fr.; Solanum nigrum subsp. humile (Fr.) Hartm.; Solanum nigrum f. humile (Fr.) Döll; Solanum nigrum var. induratum Boiss.; Solanum nigrum subsp. luteovirescens (C.C.Gmel.) Kirschl.; Solanum nigrum subsp. luteum (Mill.) Kirschl.; Solanum nigrum var. luteum Neilr.; Solanum nigrum var. luteum Döll; Solanum nigrum var. miniatum (Bernh. ex Willd.) Hartm.; Solanum nigrum subsp. miniatum (Bernh. ex Willd.) Hartm.; Solanum nigrum var. ochroleucum (Bastard) P.Fourn.; Solanum nigrum subvar. ochroleucum (Bastard) Coss. & Germ.; Solanum nigrum subsp. ochroleucum (Bastard) Corb.; Solanum nigrum proles ochroleucum (Bastard) Rouy; Solanum nigrum subsp. puniceum Kirschl.; Solanum nigrum var. rubrum (L.) Aiton; Solanum nigrum var. sancti-marini Pamp.; Solanum nigrum var. suffruticosum (Schousb. ex Willd.) Moris; Solanum nigrum subsp. villosum (L.) Ehrh.; Solanum nigrum f. villosum Döll; Solanum nigrum subsp. villosum Hartm.; Solanum nigrum var. villosum L.; Solanum nilagiricum Schltdl.; Solanum ochroleucum Bastard; Solanum olgae Pojark.; Solanum olivaceum Kit. ex Kanitz; Solanum patens Lowe.; Solanum plebeium A.Rich.; Solanum pseudovillosum Schur; Solanum puniceum C.C.Gmel.; Solanum purpureilineatum Sabnis & Bhatt; Solanum rubrum L.; Solanum sinaicum Boiss.; Solanum suffruticosum Schousb. ex Willd.; Solanum transcaucasicum Pojark.; Solanum villosum Lam.; Solanum villosum (L.) Willd.; Solanum viridescens Rchb.; Solanum vulgatum var. luteum Spenn.; Solanum woronowii Pojark.; Solanum zelenetzkii Pojark.; Witheringia rubra (L.) J.Rémy

= Solanum villosum =

Species of plant

Solanum villosum, also known as the hairy nightshade, red nightshade, or woolly nightshade, is a species of sprawling annual weed. It is found in Europe, western Asia, northern Africa and is also naturalized in Australia and North America (PoWo Map).

== Description ==
An annual herb, to 70 cm, slightly to densely hairy. The leaf blade is ovate, up to 8 cm long, 3–6 cm wide, entire or shallowly lobed, and petioles to 4.5 cm long. Clusters of 3–8–flowers in the inflorescence. The corolla is white or may be purple-tinged. Followed by dull light red or orange-yellow (depending on subspecies) globular berries, 5–9 mm diam. The seeds are 1.7–2.3 mm long and pale yellow. Compared to S. nigrum, aside from fruit colour the peduncles are moderate (S. nigrum peduncles can become quite long relative to the pedicels).
