= List of Vaccinium diseases =

Diseases of Vaccinium species, including blueberry, cranberry, bilberry, etc:

== Oomycetes ==
- Phytophthora cinnamomi

== Fungi ==
Ascomycetes
Mummy berry	Monilinia vaccinii-corymbosi
Botryosphaeria stem canker	Botryosphaeria corticis
Fusicoccum canker/Godronia canker	Godronia cassandrae
Phomopsis canker/Phomopsis twig blight and fruit rot	Phomopsis sp.
Botrytis blight and fruit rot/Botrytis blossom blight	Botrytis cinerea
Powdery mildew	Microsphaera penicillata var. vaccinii
Anthracnose/Anthracnose fruit rot of Blueberry	Colletotrichum acutatum species complex: C. fioriniae; C. simmondsii; C. salicis; C. nymphaeae; Colletotrichum gloeosporioides species complex: C. siamense; C. fructicola
Bitter rot of Cranberry	Colletotrichum acutatum species complex: C. fioriniae; Colletotrichum gloeosporioides species complex: C. fructivorum; C. rhexiae; C. temperatum; C. siamense (syn. C. melanocaulon); C. fructicola
Basidiomycetes
Leaf Rust of Blueberry and Lingonberry	Naohidemyces vaccinii
Leaf Rust of Cranberry	Pucciniastrum vaccinii

=== Bacteria ===
- Ralstonia solanacearum
- Xylella fastidiosa, including

- X. f. subsp. fastidiosa
- X. f. subsp. multiplex

== Viruses ==
- and various viruses
