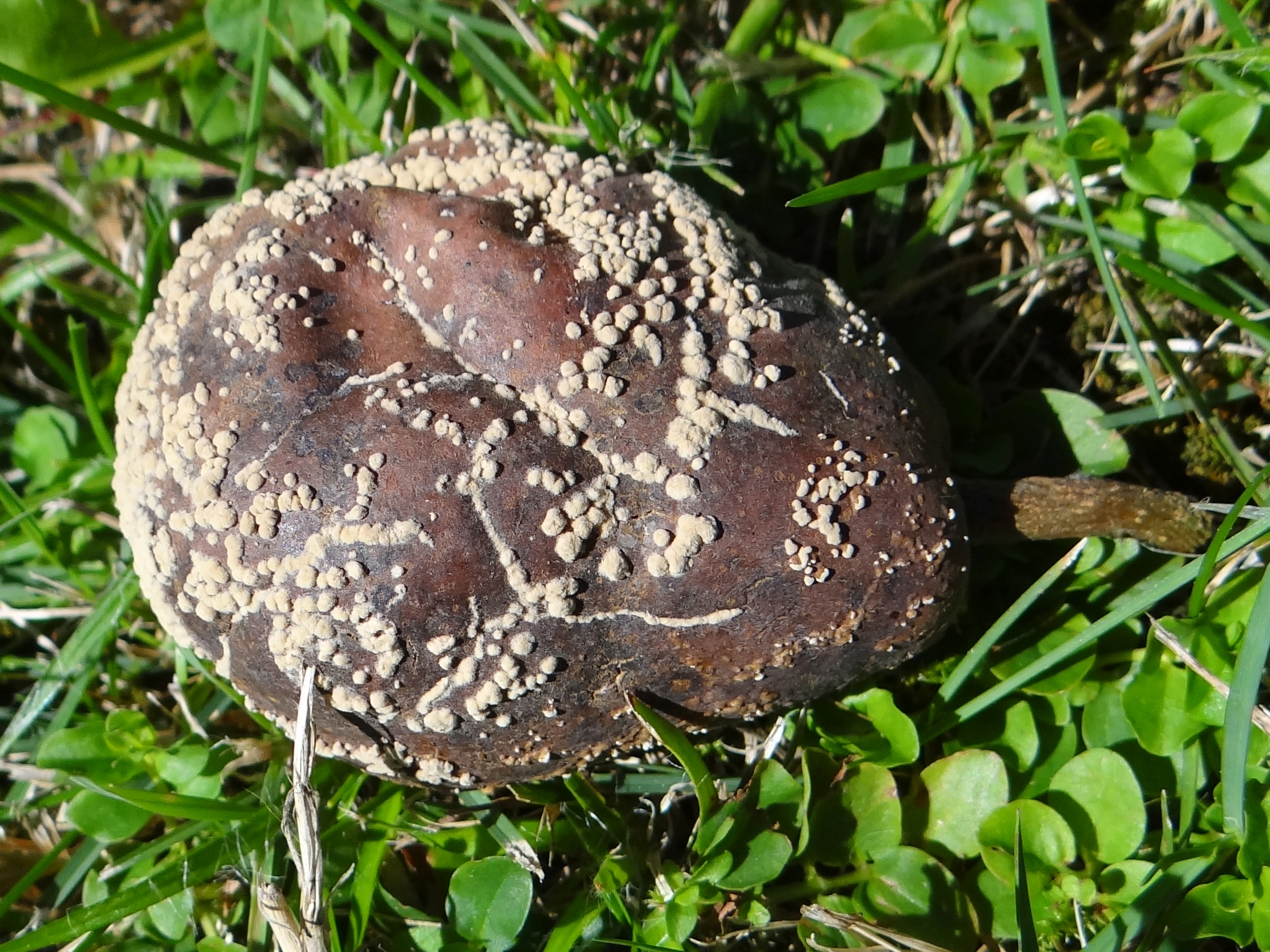
- Monilinia fructigena on a pear

Scientific classification
- Kingdom: Fungi
- Division: Ascomycota
- Class: Leotiomycetes
- Order: Helotiales
- Family: Sclerotiniaceae
- Genus: Monilinia
- Species: M. fructigena

Binomial name
- Monilinia fructigena Honey, (1945)

Synonyms
- Monilia fructigena Schumach., (1801); Sclerotinia fructigena (J.Schröt.) Norton, (1905); Sclerotinia fructigena Aderh., (1905); Stromatinia fructigena (J.Schröt.) Boud., (1907)

= Monilinia fructigena =

Species of fungus

Monilinia fructigena is a plant pathogen in the fungus kingdom causing a fruit rot of apples, pears, plums, peaches and cherries.

== Classification ==
Three Monilinia species cause brown rot of fruit (Monilinia laxa, Monilinia fructicola, Monilinia fructigena); Monilinia fructigena is found most commonly to cause brown rot in fruits of the Pome family and Rosaceae family. The genus Monilinia could be viewed as divided into two sections, Disjunctoriae and Junctoriae; M. fructigena belongs to Junctoriae. These ‘sections’ are the resulting attempt to further differentiate Monilinia into two separate classifications based on morphology, the specialization of the pathogens’ hosts, and the biological process of infection. Belonging to the section Junctoriae entails possessing no disjunctor cells in between the mature spores contained in the conidial chains. Differentiation in the laboratory of the three main Monilinia species can be quite difficult. In a report by De Cal and Melgarejo, it was demonstrated that the species can be differentiated through altering the light exposure to a long-wave UV light and dark cycle. Monilinia fructigena and Monilinia fructicola can be recognized from Monilinia laxa in this experiment, as M. laxa possesses a noticeably short distance from the conidia to the first germ tube branch. Furthermore, M. fructigena and M. fructicola can be individually distinguishable through measuring the maximum diametric growth rate of the culture. The maximum growth rate of M. fructigena was just 8 mm/2 days, whilst M. fructicola expanded its diameter by 20 mm after two days. Conidia produced by Monilinia fructigena are noted to be dry spores, and are not discharged, but pulled away on currents of wind. The conidiophores are short and unspecialized, and perform as a means to elevate the spore chains above infected tissues to provide better exposure to air currents. Except for the occasion of a desiccated infected fruit falling to the ground, peduncles and fruits carrying the pathogen are in the perfect place for further dispersal of airborne spores—in a tree, of course. Infection of fruits by M. fructigena can take place during all periods of development, from the fruitlet to the mature fruit.

== Hosts and symptoms ==
When infection occurs during or shortly after pollination, asymptomatic growth of the pathogen allows the fruit to mature normally. However, as the fruit ripens, small circular brown spots begin developing and quickly rotting on the flesh's surface; given plenty of moisture, conidial pustules develop on the infected areas. On mature infected fruits, brown rot spreads quickly throughout the fruit as a brown decay of the flesh. In areas/climates with high relative humidity, conidial tufts appear at the surface of the fruit; when RH is low, the fruit simply desiccates. Fruit rot caused by the brown rot pathogen Monilinia fructigena is a notorious ailment found in Malus domestica—the apple tree—with the fungus occasionally spreading from the infected fruit to the branches, causing cankering. With apple infections, a varying symptom can occur within the fruits, causing what is commonly known as “black apple”. This symptom entails the color of the rot changing from brown to a deep shade of black. The apple skin remains shiny and unbroken, and shrinkage of the actual tissue does not occur until later in development, where it often rots quickly in storage. Fruit rot is commonly found on apples, pears, and plums, but is less often found within peaches, nectarines, or apricots.

== Disease cycle ==
Within the short span of several days, the entire ripe fruit is rotten and rife with conidial tufts and/or vegetative growth of mycelium. When relative humidity surrounding the fruit is low, conidial tufts and mycelium do not develop. After dropping in a mummified form to the ground, the pathogen overwinters, eventually sending up apothecia to produce the wind-carried ascospores that arrive on new plant tissues. Fallen infected tissues that possess sufficient moisture to undergo the sporulation process often provide a source of secondary inoculation. Under the right conditions, mycelial growth takes place, forming a hardened sclerotia sphere-shape around the core or seed of the fruit. As this mycelial/stroma growth is taking place, the outside of the fruit rots away. The resulting germination utilizes a third type of spore called a “microconidia” that acts as a spermatia in sexual reproduction. Roberts and Dunegan postulated that the means of aerial distribution of conidia resulted in widespread transportation to new hosts, while rain performs well as a means of washing the conidia into more favorable conditions. Conidia are not the only primary way Monilinia fructigena has been observed to be propagated in nature. There are numerous insects, such as wasps, beetles, flies, and butterflies that have been recognized as vectors of Monilinia spp. Birds wounding the tree or its fruits have been identified as possible wound-causing agents that allow the fungus to enter the host.

== Environment and management ==
In a study conducted over a period of four years by Holb and Scherm (2007), it was reasonably concluded that the use of integrated management along with inorganic insecticides attributed a lower infection rate (6.4%) than plots using just organic insecticides (20.1%). With Monilinia fructigena, primary infection of the pathogen occurs through wounds; vector control may be a more logical route of attempting to control the fungus. It was also found that certain fungicides, namely pyraclostrobin and boscalid, applied after spring bloom were effective against Monilinia fructigena as a means of combating primary infection. Conidia produced by Monilinia fructigena are also spread by the wind in times of high temperatures and low relative humidity; conidia can also be spread by rain drops. When spores are spread by rain dislodging the conidia, the added water also provides a supply of moisture for germination and mycelial development.

== Photographs ==
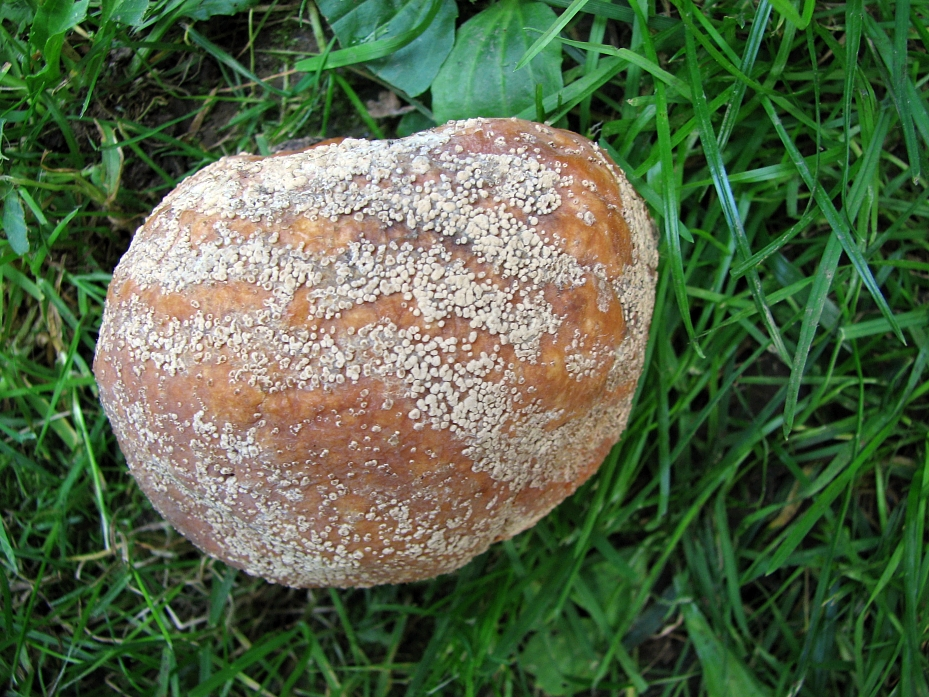

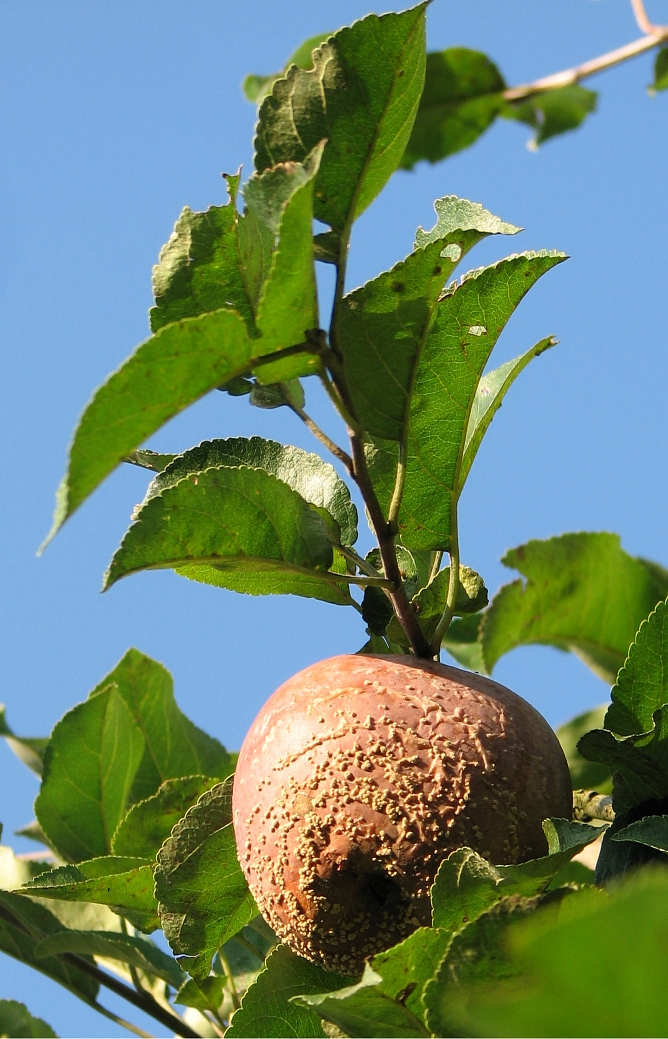

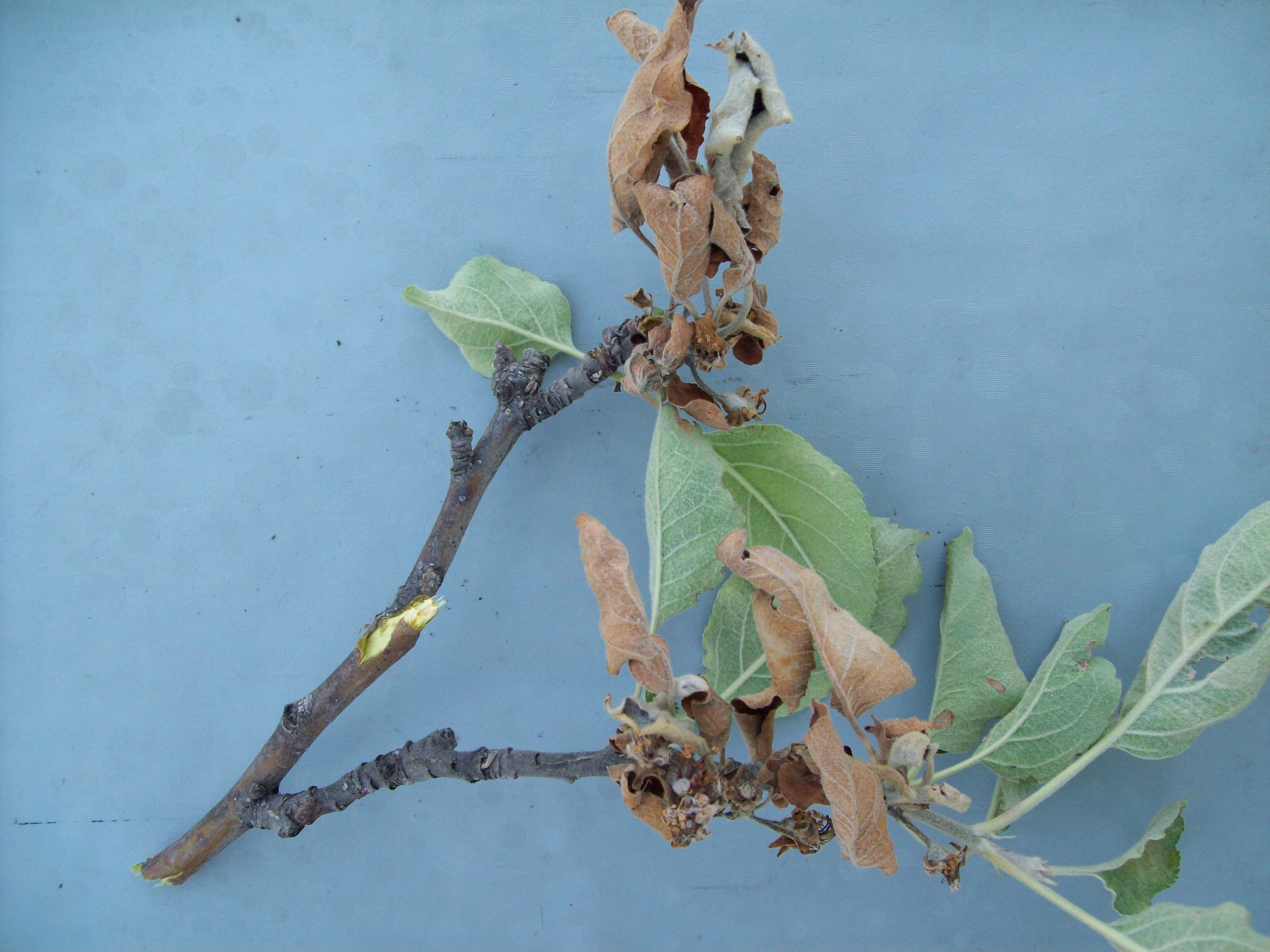
