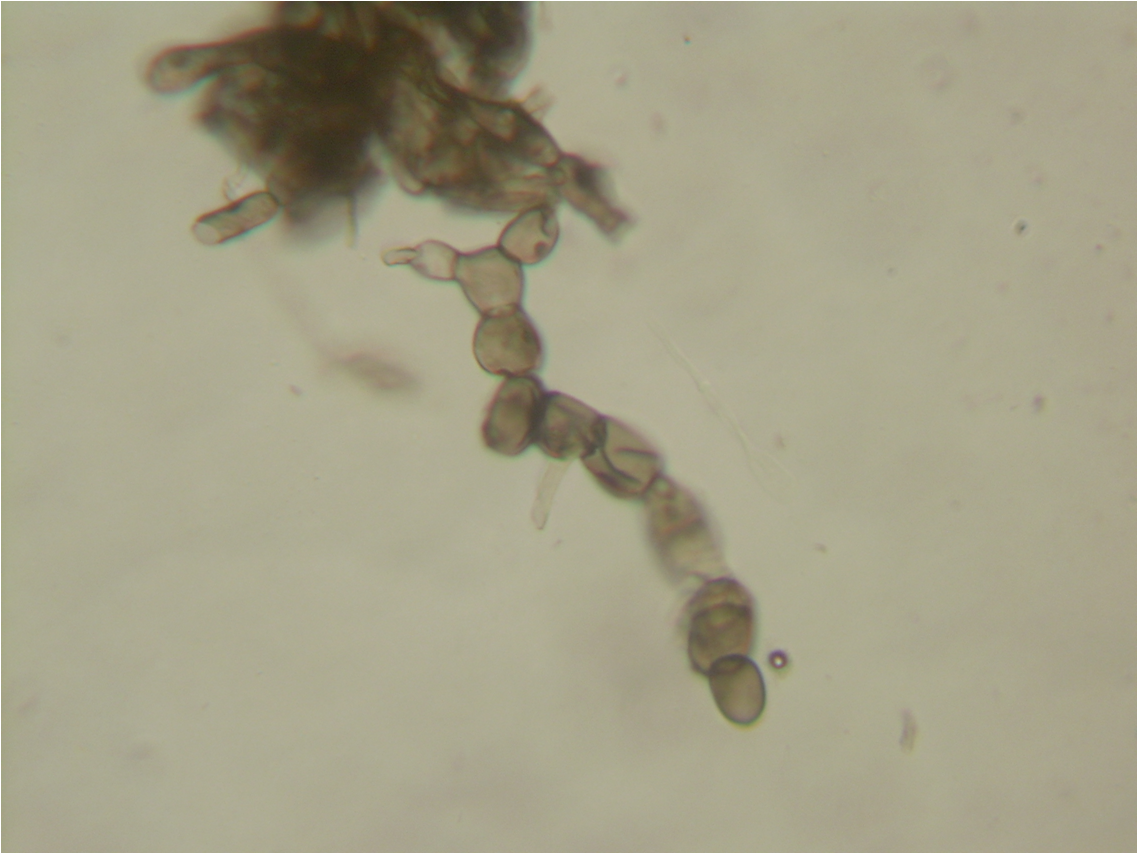
- Spores of the anamorph of Monilinia

Scientific classification
- Domain: Eukaryota
- Kingdom: Fungi
- Division: Ascomycota
- Class: Leotiomycetes
- Order: Helotiales
- Family: Sclerotiniaceae
- Genus: Monilinia; Honey

Type species
- Monilinia fructicola (G.Winter) Honey

= Monilinia =

Genus of fungi

Monilinia is a genus of fungi in the family Sclerotiniaceae.

Monilinia fungi are pathogens to Rosaceae and Ericaceae and often cause major losses to crops. The genus is sometimes divided into two sections based on whether they possess disjunctors - these are small structures in mature fungi that help with spore dispersal. There are about thirty known species in this genus. Most studies of the fungi focus on their pathogenic effects toward apples, pears and other fruits. The diseases they cause include brown rot and dry berry disease.

In Japan, some species have pharmacological uses.

== Species ==
The Global Biodiversity Information Facility lists:

1. Monilinia alpina L.R.Batra
2. Monilinia amelanchieris (J.M.Reade) Honey
3. Monilinia ariae (Schellenb.) Whetzel
4. Monilinia aroniae Honey
5. Monilinia aucupariae (F.Ludw.) Whetzel
6. Monilinia azaleae Honey
7. Monilinia baccarum (J.Schröt.) Whetzel
8. Monilinia cassiopes (Rostr.) L.Holm
9. Monilinia corni (J.M.Reade) Honey
10. Monilinia cydoniae (Schellenb.) Whetzel
11. Monilinia demissa (B.F.Dana) Honey
12. Monilinia emarginata Honey
13. Monilinia empetri (Lagerh.) B.Erikss.
14. Monilinia fructicola (G.Winter) Honey
15. Monilinia fructigena (Pers.) Honey
16. Monilinia gaylussaciae L.R.Batra
17. Monilinia gregaria (B.F.Dana) Honey
18. Monilinia jezoensis Yuk.Takah., T.Sano & Y.Harada
19. Monilinia johnsonii (Ellis & Everh.) Honey
20. Monilinia kusanoi (Henn. ex Takah.) W.Yamam.
21. Monilinia laxa (Aderh. & Ruhland) Honey
22. Monilinia ledi (Navashin) Whetzel
23. Monilinia linhartiana (Prill. & Delacr.) Dennis
24. Monilinia linhartiana (Prill. & Delacr.) N.F.Buchw.
25. Monilinia magalospora (Woronin) Whetzel
26. Monilinia mali (Takah.) Whetzel
27. Monilinia megalospora (Woronin) Whetzel
28. Monilinia mespili Whetzel
29. Monilinia mume (Hara) W.Yamam.
30. Monilinia mumeicola (Y.Harada, Y.Sasaki & T.Sano) Sand.-Den. & Crous
31. Monilinia olympia L.R.Batra
32. Monilinia oxycocci (Woronin) Honey
33. Monilinia padi (Woronin) Honey
34. Monilinia polycodii (J.M.Reade) Honey
35. Monilinia polystroma (G.Leeuwen) L.M.Kohn
36. Monilinia seaveri (Rehm) Honey
37. Monilinia ssiori Y.Harada, M.Sasaki & T.Sano
38. Monilinia urnula (Weinm.) Whetzel
39. Monilinia vaccinii-corymbosi (J.M.Reade) Honey
- Note: Monilinia rubi has also been placed as Rhizoctonia rubi
