= Bitter rot of apple =

Plant disease

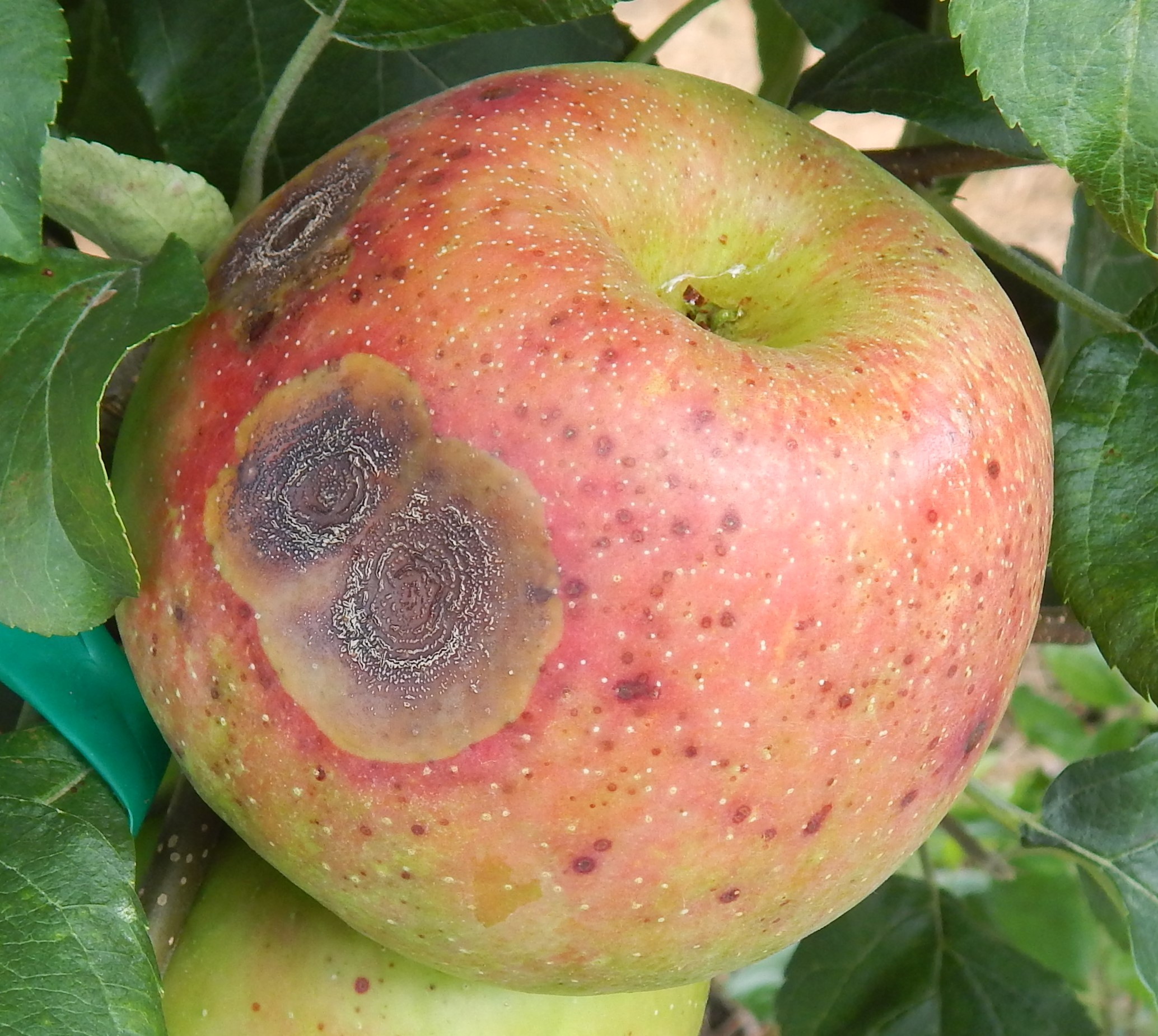
- Bitter rot on a Honeycrisp apple, showing characteristic sunken lesions. Concentric rings of acervuli are visible on the lesion surface.
- Common names: Apple athracnose, apple bitter rot, bitter rot, bitter rot of apple, Glomerella fruit rot
- Causal agents: Colletotrichum acutatum and C. gloeosporioides species complexes
- Vectors: Rain-splashed
- Distribution: Worldwide in regions with warm wet weather
- Symptoms: Sunken lesions that extend in a cone shape into the apple flesh
- Treatment: Planting of less susceptible apple cultivars, horticultural practices that promote tree health and reduce fruit wetness hours, removal of overwintering diseased twigs and fruit, and fungicides

Bitter rot of apple is a fungal disease of apple fruit that is caused by several species in the Colletotrichum acutatum and Colletotrichum gloeosporioides species complexes. It is identified by sunken circular lesions with conical intrusions into the apple flesh that appear V-shaped when the apple is cut in half through the center of the lesion. It is one of the most devastating diseases of apple fruit in regions with warm wet weather.

== Common names ==
The term “bitter rot” has consistently been associated with this disease in literature from the United States going back through the 1800s. During the 1950s to 1980s there was literature out of Great Britain and Ireland that used the common name of “bitter rot” for apple rots caused by Neofabraea (or the older synonym of Gloeosporium) species, which are now referred to as lenticel rot or bulls eye rot. Literature from South Korea often uses the name of "apple anthracnose". Some scientists distinguish between rots caused by the C. gloeosporioides and C. acutatum species complexes, calling them "Glomerella rot" and "bitter rot", respectively. However "bitter rot" or the more specific "bitter rot of apple" or "apple bitter rot" are the most common terms used in English language literature.

== Causal species ==
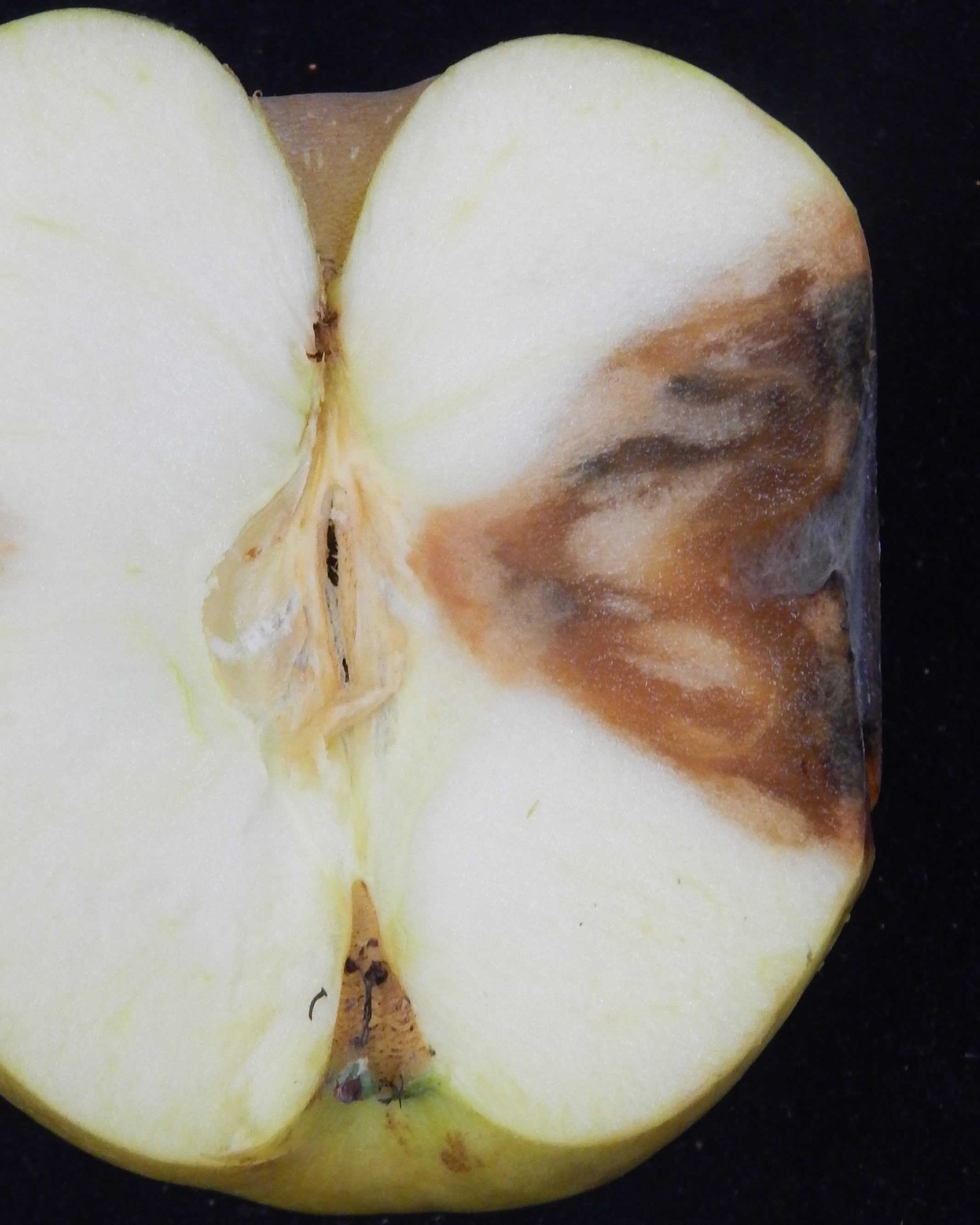
A bitter rot lesion in an apple that has been sliced through the center, showing the characteristic cone-shaped or V-shaped intrusion into the apple flesh

=== Historical names ===
The fungi that cause bitter rot of apple were first formally described in 1856 by Miles Berkeley of Great Britain as Gloeosporium fructigenum. Bertha Stoneman later observed that G. fructigenum was similar to certain fungi from citrus that Pier Andrea Saccardo had placed in the Genus Colletotrichum. In the early 1900s Perley Spaulding and Hermann Von Schrenk lumped several indistinguishable fungi together under the name Glomerella cingulata. While technically only the name for the teleomorph, in practice the name G. cingulata was used for both the sexual and asexual fungi that were causing bitter rot. In the United States it was noted that the fungi that cause bitter rot could broadly be divided into an asexual northern form and a faster-growing perithecia-producing (sexually reproducing) southern form.

Though rarely used to describe the fungus that caused bitter rot, the anamorph (asexual form) went by multiple different names that usually differed based on what host plant they were isolated from. In 1957 the great lumper of fungal species Josef Adolf von Arx created some order out of the chaos and synonymized over 600 fungal names into the single name of Colletotrichum gloeosporioides. However, von Arx went just a touch too far, and less than a decade later the isolates that had acute (pointed) conidia (asexual spores) were named Colletotrichum acutatum. G. cingulata and C. gloeosporioides were the teleomorph and anamorph (sexual and asexual) stages of the same fungus, while C. acutatum was an anamorph for which a teleomorph was almost never observed.

While the name of G. cingulata was most common, the fungi that cause bitter rot were categorized under the names of G. cingulata, C. gloeosporioides, and C. acutatum up through the early 2000s.

=== Current names ===
With the development of species identification based on molecular phylogenetics, determination of the sexual stage was no required and the single genus name of Colletotrichum was chosen as the holomorph. Using molecular phylogenetics the C. gloeosporioides and C. acutatum species were each split up into several dozen new species, which are now grouped together as species complexes.

Within the C. acutatum species complex, the species of C. fioriniae, C. godetiae, C. nymphaeae, C. salicis, C. orientalis, C. cuscutae, C. acerbum, C. acutatum sensu stricto, C. melonis, C. rhombiforme, C. limetticola, C. paranaense, and C. simmondsii have so far been identified as causing bitter rot. Of these C. fioriniae, C. godetiae, and C. nymphaeae are by far the most common species associated with bitter rot.

Within the C. gloeosporioides species complex, C. fructicola, C. chrysophilum, C. siamense, C. noveboracense, C. tropicale, C. alienum, C. theobromicola (syn. C. fragariae), C. aenigma, C. kahawae, C. gloeosporioides sensu stricto, and C. henanense have been identified as causing bitter rot. Of these C. fructicola, C. chrysophilum, C. siamense, and C. noveboracense are by far the most common species associated with bitter rot.

=== Characteristics ===
Of the two species complexes, the C. gloeosporioides species complex tends to have higher optimal growth temperatures and faster growth than the C. acutatum species complex. The surface of rots caused by the C. gloeosporioides species complex tend to be smooth, while those caused by the C. acutatum species complex tend to have concentric rings of acervuli that produce salmon-colored masses of conidia. Within the two species complexes, the individual species are not known to differ substantially from each other in horticulturally significant ways. Both species complexes are hemibiotrophs, and the primary ecological niche of many of these species is likely endophytic.

== Disease Cycle ==
The Colletotrichum species that cause bitter rot overwinter in infected fruit mummies, buds, twigs, and branch cankers. Under humid conditions infected apples that drop to the soil surface in the fall are not a significant source of inoculum the next year, as Colletotrichum will generally be succeeded by various yeasts. Spores are dispersed throughout the year during periods of leaf wetness when the temperature is between 10°C and 32°C. Apple fruit can become infected during the growing season anytime spores are available and temperature and wetness hours are optimal for infection. In a pattern typical of hemibiotrophs, the bitter rot infection will establish itself without causing rot, then will often wait until the fruit ripens and is less resistant to rot to switch to necrotrophy and form the dark sunken bitter rot lesions. Fruit that is infected during the summer will often not show any symptoms of rot until close to or after harvest.

== Management ==
=== Cultural control ===
Bitter rot of apple management begins with good horticultural practices that includes the planting of trees that are less susceptible to bitter rot, the removal of infected fruit, dead twigs, and cankers during the dormant season, good horticultural practices to maintain the health and vigor of the tree, and training and pruning the tree to allow airflow into the tree canopy to dry it out and reduce the amount of time the fruit is wet.

=== Fungicides ===
Even with good horticultural practices, successful control of bitter rot on susceptible cultivars under warm and wet conditions requires regular applications of fungicides. Fungicides should be applied before infection occurs as few if any registered fungicides have good curative activity. The most effective fungicides for bitter rot control include the multisite mode-of-action fungicide captan, the osmotic signal transduction disrupter fludioxonil, the oxidative phosphorylation uncoupler fluazinam, the QOI inhibitors pyraclostrobin and trifloxystrobin, and the SDHI inhibitor benzovindiflupyr.
