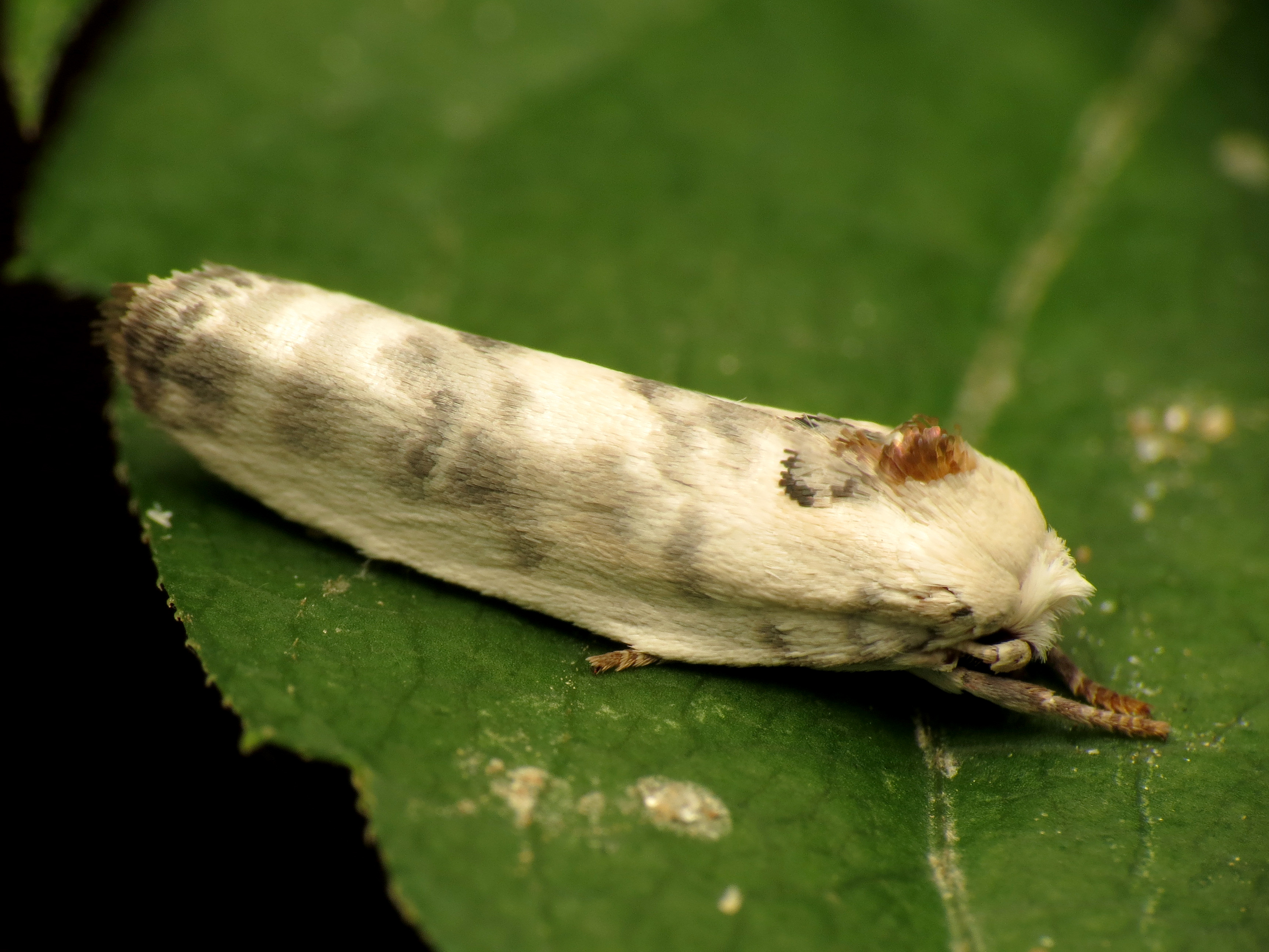

Scientific classification
- Kingdom: Animalia
- Phylum: Arthropoda
- Clade: Pancrustacea
- Class: Insecta
- Order: Lepidoptera
- Family: Depressariidae
- Genus: Antaeotricha
- Species: A. leucillana

Binomial name
- Antaeotricha leucillana (Zeller, 1854)

Synonyms
- Cryptolechia leucillana Zeller, 1854; Cryptolechia algidella Walker, 1864

= Antaeotricha leucillana =

Species of moth

Antaeotricha leucillana, the pale gray bird-dropping moth, is a moth in the family Depressariidae. It was described by Philipp Christoph Zeller in 1854. It is found in North America, where it has been recorded from New Hampshire, Massachusetts, New York, Pennsylvania, District of Columbia, Virginia, North Carolina, Georgia, Alabama, Arkansas, Missouri, Kansas, Illinois, Iowa, Texas, Oregon, Louisiana, Manitoba and Nova Scotia.

The wingspan is 15–23 mm. Adults have been recorded on wing from April to August in Ohio.

The larvae feed on the leaves of Pyracantha crenulata, Malus, Vaccinium corymbosum and Acer.
