= Evergreen blueberry =

A number of plants in the genus Vaccinium share the common name Evergreen blueberry:

- Vaccinium darrowii (Darrow's evergreen blueberry, southeastern United States)
- Vaccinium myrsinites (Shiny blueberry, southeastern United States)
- Vaccinium ovatum (Evergreen huckleberry, Pacific coast of North America)
Plants named Evergreen blueberry
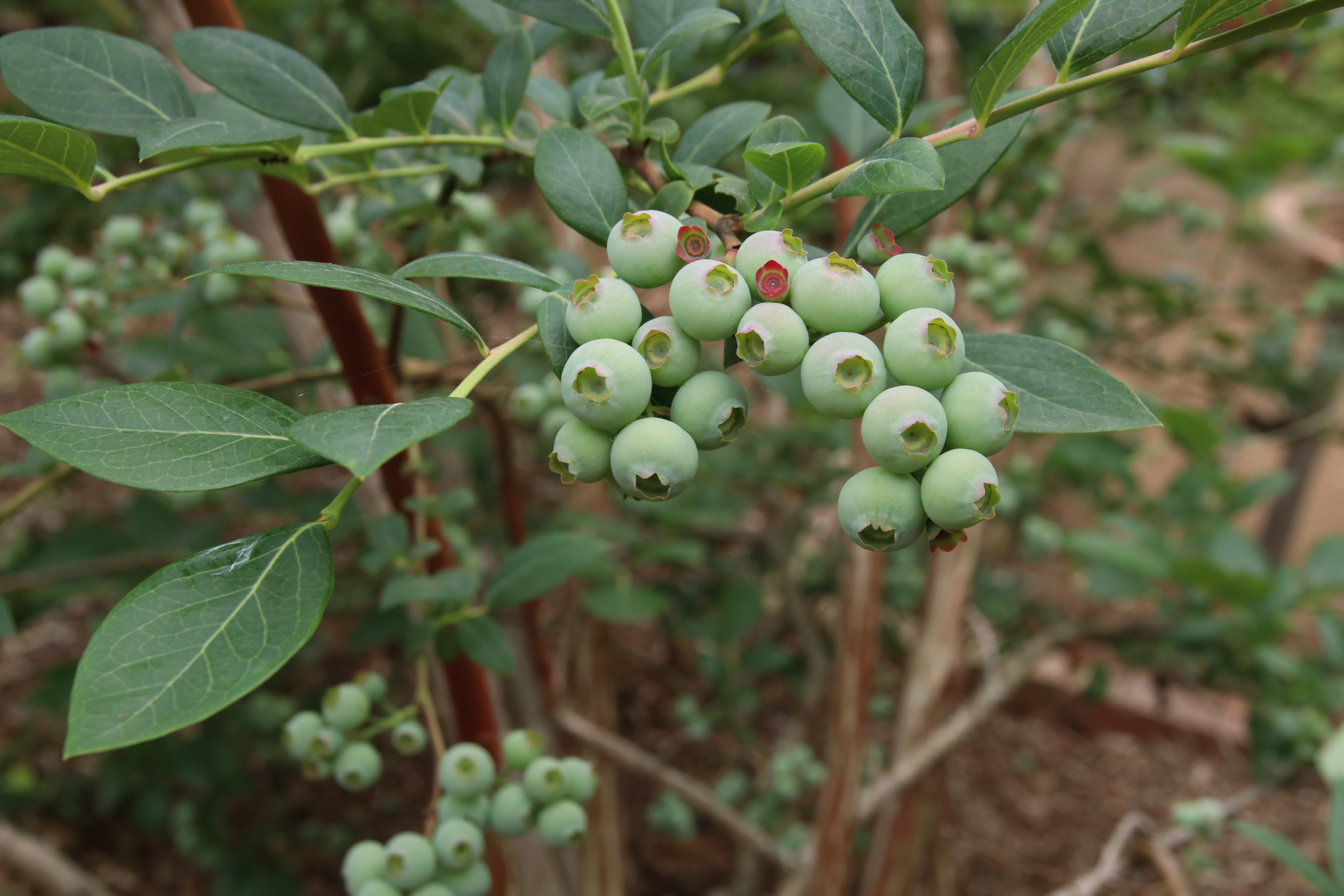
Green fruit of Vaccinium darrowii

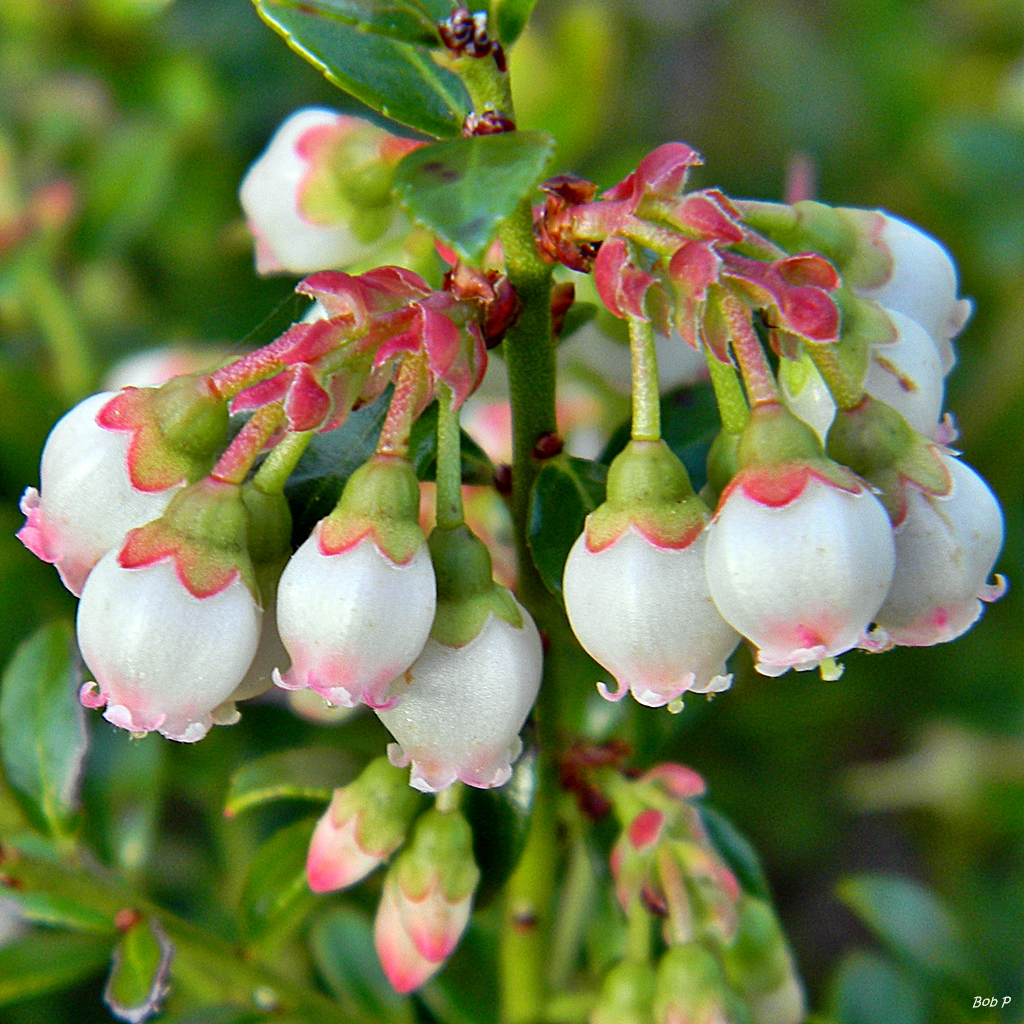
Flowers of Vaccinium myrsinites

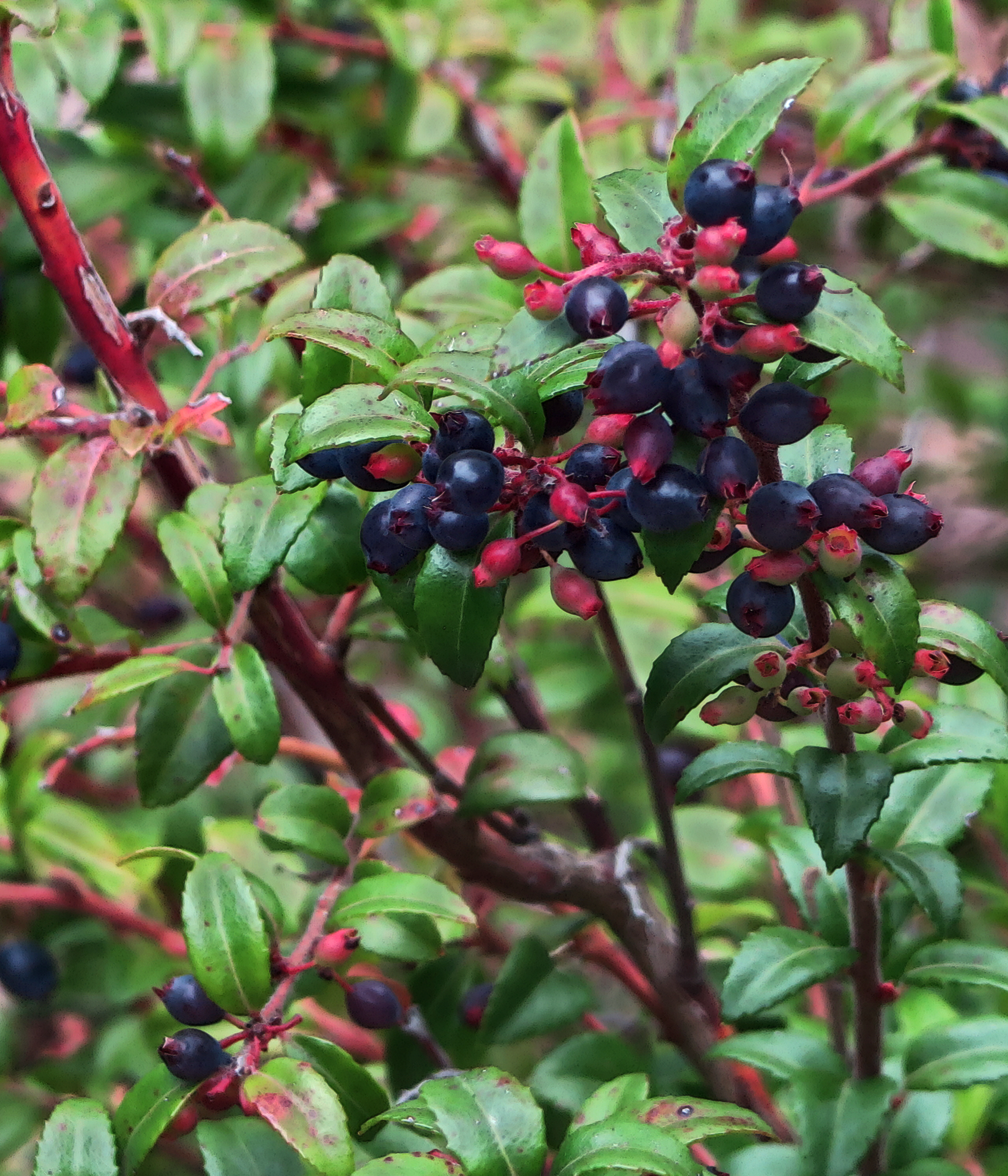
Pear-shaped fruit of Vaccinium ovatum var. sporosum
