= Monilinia mali =

Scientific classification
- Kingdom: Fungi
- Division: Ascomycota
- Class: Leotiomycetes
- Order: Helotiales
- Family: Sclerotiniaceae
- Genus: Monilinia
- Species: M. mali

Binomial name
- Monilinia mali Honey, (1945)

Species of fungus

Monilinia mali is a fungal plant pathogen which causes brown rot blossom blight on pome and stone fruits. Infected blossoms turn brown, wilt, and die, while infected fruits develop soft brown lesions that expand until much of the fruit decays. Diseased fruits may dry into mummified fruits that remain attached to the tree or fall to the ground.

The fungus survives between growing seasons in infected twigs and mummified fruits. Under moist and humid conditions, these tissues produce spores that infect blossoms and developing fruit. The disease can therefore spread during flowering and fruit maturation, leading to blossom death, fruit decay, and losses in orchard production.
