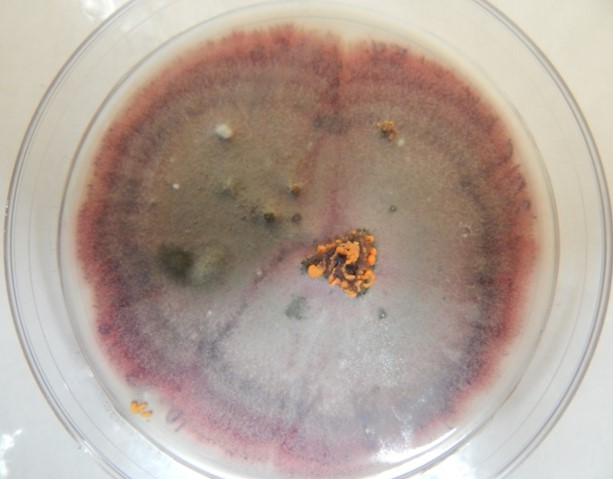
- Culture of Colletotrichum fioriniae
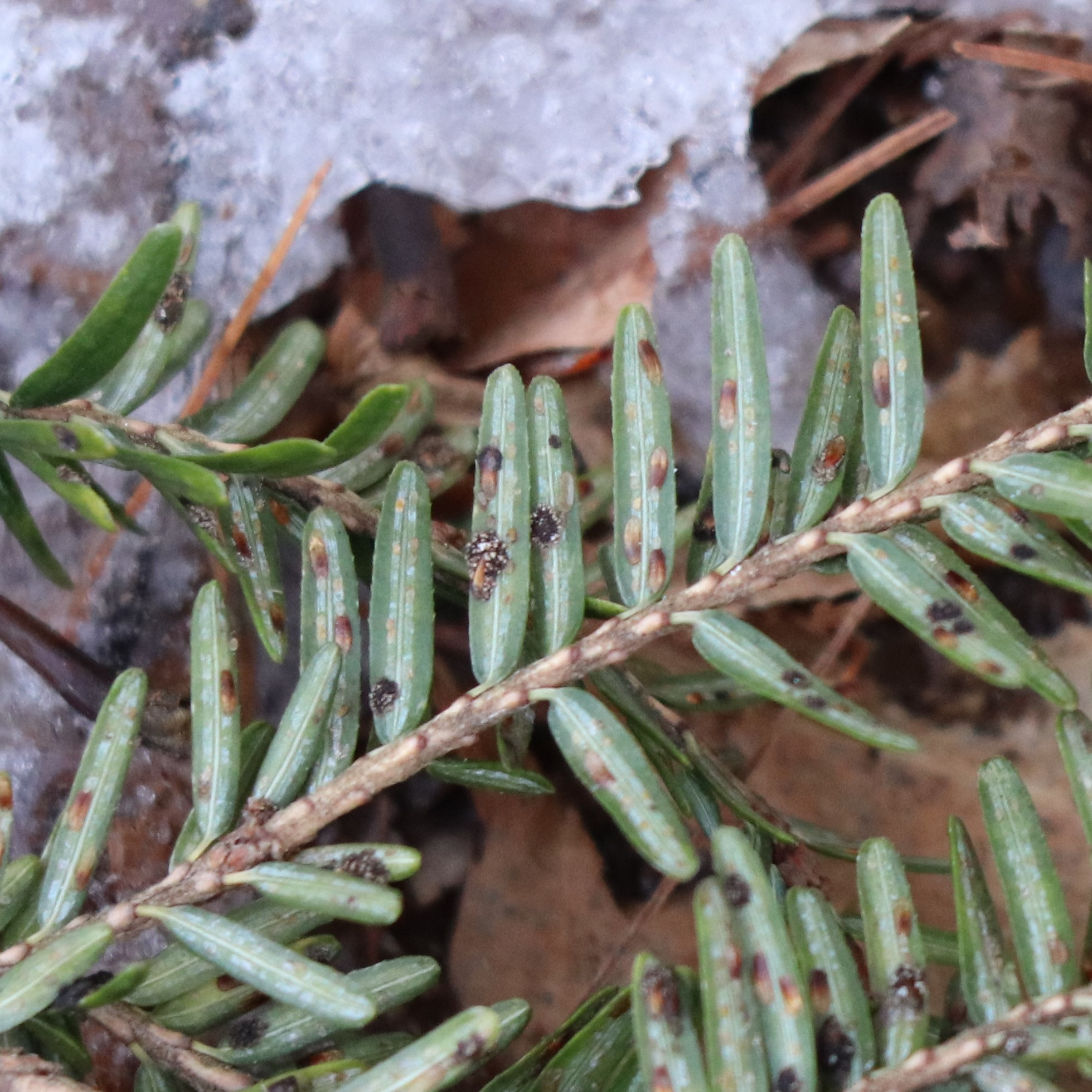
- C. fioriniae in the wild

Scientific classification
- Kingdom: Fungi
- Division: Ascomycota
- Class: Sordariomycetes
- Order: Glomerellales
- Family: Glomerellaceae
- Genus: Colletotrichum
- Species complex: Colletotrichum acutatum species complex
- Species: C. fioriniae

Binomial name
- Colletotrichum fioriniae Marcelino & Gouli (2008)

= Colletotrichum fioriniae =

Fungal species

Colletotrichum fioriniae is a fungal plant pathogen and endophyte of fruits and foliage of many broadleaved plants worldwide. It causes diseases on agriculturally important crops, including anthracnose of strawberry, ripe rot of grapes, bitter rot of apple, anthracnose of peach, and anthracnose of blueberry. Its ecological role in the natural environment is less well understood, other than it is a common leaf endophyte of many temperate trees and shrubs and in some cases may function as an entomopathogen with insecticidal properties.

== Taxonomic history ==
C. fioriniae was formally described as a variety of Colletotrichum acutatum in 2008, and as its own species shortly thereafter. However, while it had not previously been recognized as a separate species, when grown on potato dextrose agar it produces a distinct pink to maroon red color on the bottom side and was described in historical studies as "chromogenic" isolates of Glomerella cingulata. It is currently recognized as a species within the C. acutatum species complex.

== Identification ==
C. fioriniae produces conidia that are smooth-walled, hyaline (glassy and translucent), with acute (pointed) ends, measuring about 15 x 4.5 microns. When grown on potato dextrose agar it usually produces a pink to dark red chromogenic color on the reverse side. However, these morphological characteristic overlap with those of other species in the C. acutatum species complex, so definitive identification requires the sequencing of DNA barcoding regions such as the internally transcribed spacer (ITS), or introns in the GAPDH, histone3, beta-tubulin, or actin genes.

== Reproduction ==
Like other species in the C. acutatum species complex, C. fioriniae reproduces almost exclusively via the production of asexual spores called conidia. These conidia are often produced in sticky gelatinous orange masses that are rain-splash dispersed. Conidia are mostly produced at temperatures from 10 to 30 °C, such that in temperate deciduous forests and orchards rain-splash dispersal occurs from bud-break to leaf drop.

== Pathogenic lifestyle ==
As a plant pathogen, C. fioriniae has a hemibiotrophic lifestyle, where infections are initially biotrophic (or latent or quiescent, depending on the point of view) before switching to necrotrophy and active killing of the plant cells.

== Ecological interactions ==
Colletotrichum fioriniae is a major pathogen of many soft-skinned fruits such as blueberries and strawberries. Blueberries infested with C. fioriniae were found to differentially emit isobutyraldehyde, isobutanol, 2-methyl-1-butanol, isoamyl alcohol, isoprenol, (E)-2-hexen-1-ol, styrene, ethyl propionate, ethyl 2-methylpropanoate, ethyl butyrate, diethyl carbonate, ethyl (E)-but-2-enoate, ethyl 3-hydroxy-3-methylbutanoate, and acetoin. Some of these volatiles, specifically ethyl (E)-but-2-enoate and ethyl butyrate, have been found to repel spotted-wing drosophila one of the major insect pests of soft-skinned fruit.
