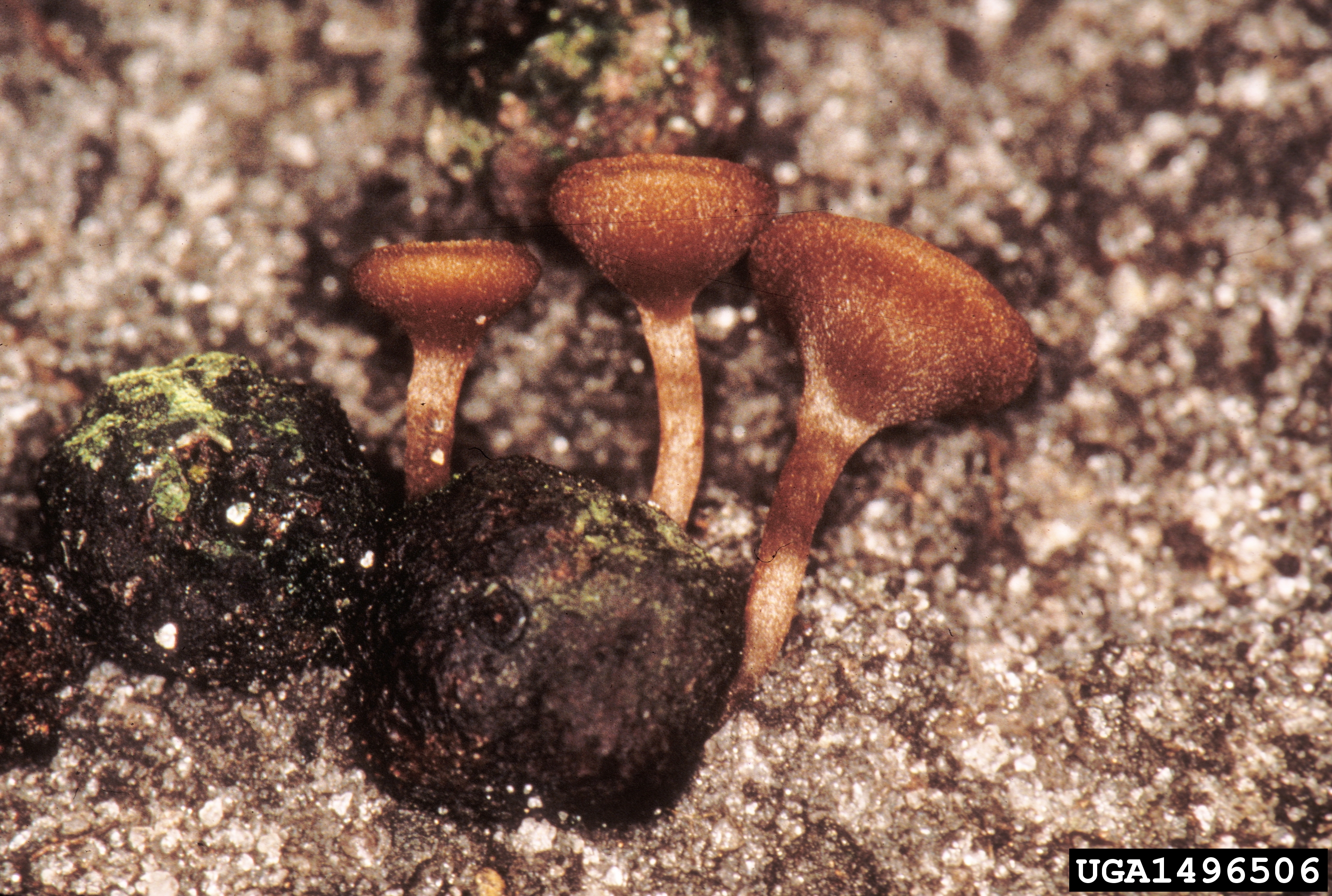

Scientific classification
- Kingdom: Fungi
- Division: Ascomycota
- Class: Leotiomycetes
- Order: Helotiales
- Family: Sclerotiniaceae
- Genus: Monilinia
- Species: M. vaccinii-corymbosi

Binomial name
- Monilinia vaccinii-corymbosi (J.M. Reade) Honey

Synonyms
- Sclerotina vaccinii-corymbosi J.M. Reade

= Monilinia vaccinii-corymbosi =

Species of fungus

Monilinia vaccinii-corymbosi
- Mycological characteristics
- Smooth hymenium
- No distinct cap
- Hymenium attachment is irregular or not applicable
- Stipe is bare
- Ecology is parasitic
- Edibility is unknown or inedible

Monilinia vaccinii-corymbosi is a species of fungus in the family Sclerotinaceae. It is a plant pathogen, infecting blueberry plants. It causes the disease mummy berry.

== Taxonomy ==
Monilinia vaccinii-corymbosi was described by J.M. Reade in 1908 as Sclerotinia vaccinii-corymbosi. In 1936, Edwin Earle Honey transferred it to the genus Monilinia.

== Description ==
In the spring, Monilinia vaccinii-corymbosi infects the young shoots and leaves of blueberry plants, causing them to die. The fungus produces a layer of gray spores on the plant.

The apothecia of M. vaccinii-corymbosi are brown in color and about 1-3.5 centimeters tall. The stipe is about 1-2 millimeters wide. The cap is cup-shaped and about 5-10 millimeters wide. They grow out of mummified fruit.

== Life cycle ==
=== Primary infection ===
Apothecia of Monilinia vaccinii-corymbosi sprout from mummified blueberries in early spring, releasing sexually-produced ascospores into the air. These ascospores land on young shoots, leaf buds, and flower buds of blueberry plants, where they cause a primary infection. The fungus causes the leaves and shoots of the plant to wilt and turn brown. Then, it begins to produce asexual spores called conidia on the surface of the plant.

==== Mimicry of flowers ====
At this stage, it is thought that M. vaccinii-corymbosi mimics blueberry flowers. The fungus produces sugars and emits a smell described as being "sweet" or like "fermented tea". It even reflects UV light, similarly to the sepals of blueberry flowers. This attracts pollinators such as bees, which become coated in conidia.

=== Secondary infection ===
Pollinators carrying conidia land on blueberry flowers, transferring spores onto the stigma. It grows down the style and into the ovary of the flower. As the flower becomes a blueberry, the fungus colonizes the fruit. This causes it to shrivel up and eventually drop off. At this stage, the blueberry becomes a sclerotium or pseudosclerotium. The flesh of the berry is replaced with mycelium, with only the skin remaining, rendering the berry inedible. Eventually, the skin of the blueberry falls off, causing the pseudosclerotium to resemble a small black pumpkin. The pseudosclerotium overwinters on the ground. In early spring, apothecia sprout and release spores, continuing the life cycle.

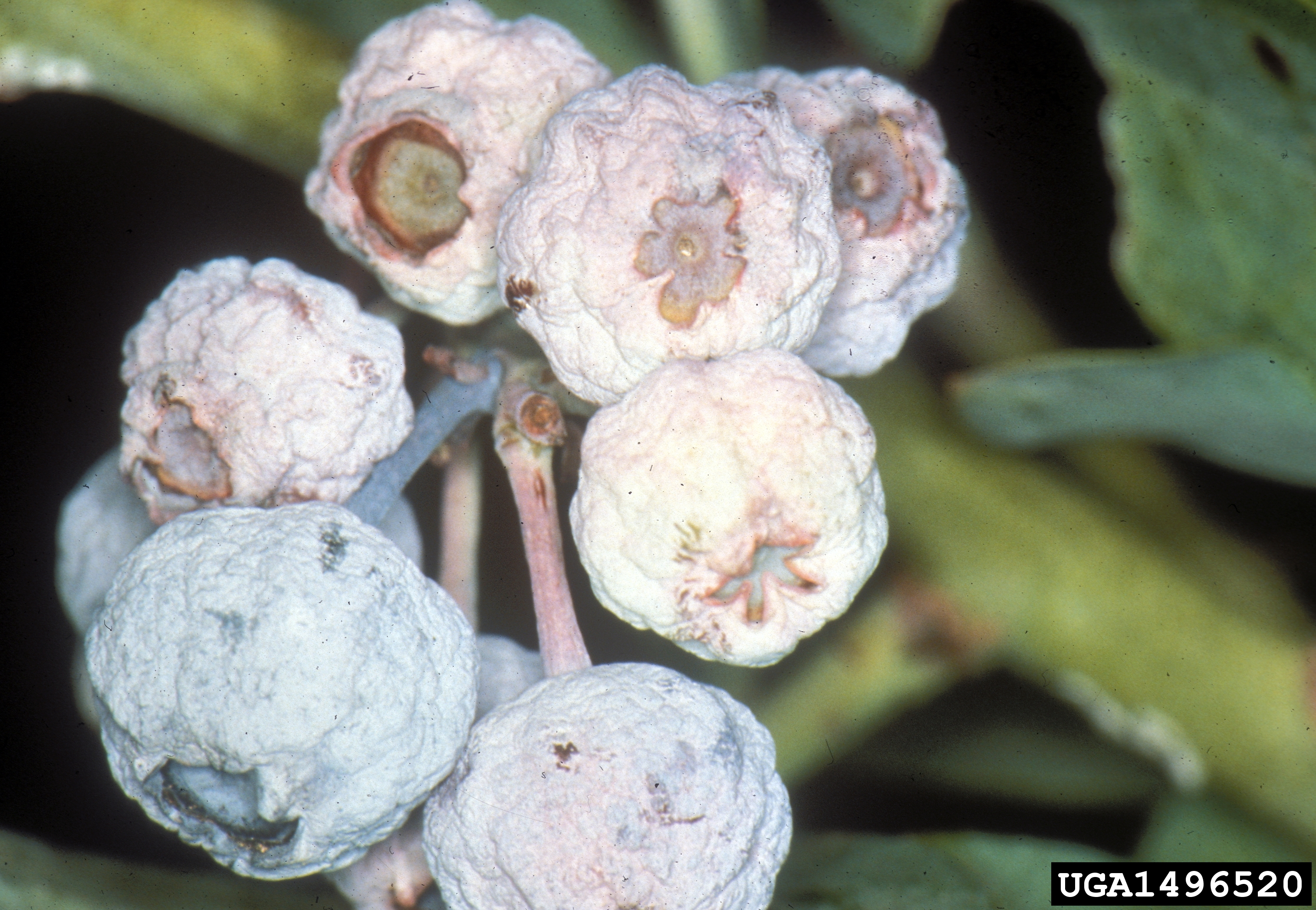
Mummified blueberries

== Economic significance ==
Monilinia vaccinii-corymbosi is considered a serious pest to blueberry farms. In 1969 in British Columbia, M. vaccinii-corymbosi caused $66,462 in damage to highbush blueberries. In New Hampshire, infection rates reached 85%, with organic farms having nearly 100% loss rates, as of 2021. The fungus is also a threat to organic blueberry farming in the Pacific Northwest.

== Management and control ==
Several methods are used for controlling Monilinia vaccinii-corymbosi. Mulching is done to cover up pseudosclerotia and has been shown to prevent apothecia from growing. Fungicides are also used to control the fungus. Additionally, certain blueberry varieties have demonstrated resistance to the disease, such as Legacy, Powderblue, and Duke.
