= Monilinia rubi =

Scientific classification
- Kingdom: Fungi
- Division: Ascomycota
- Class: Leotiomycetes
- Order: Helotiales
- Family: Sclerotiniaceae
- Genus: Monilinia
- Species: M. rubi

Binomial name
- Monilinia rubi Weldon & V.O. Stockw.

Synonyms
- Rhizoctonia rubi McKeen

Species of fungus

Monilinia rubi is a species of fungus in the family Sclerotiniaceae. The species is a plant pathogen causing "dry berry disease" of caneberries. The species was formerly known by the invalidly published name Rhizoctonia rubi.
