= Monilinia azaleae =

Scientific classification
- Kingdom: Fungi
- Division: Ascomycota
- Class: Leotiomycetes
- Order: Helotiales
- Family: Sclerotiniaceae
- Genus: Monilinia
- Species: M. azaleae

Binomial name
- Monilinia azaleae Honey (1936)

Species of fungus

Monilinia azaleae is a species of fungus in family Sclerotiniaceae. A plant pathogen, it was first formally described by Edwin Earle Honey in 1936.
