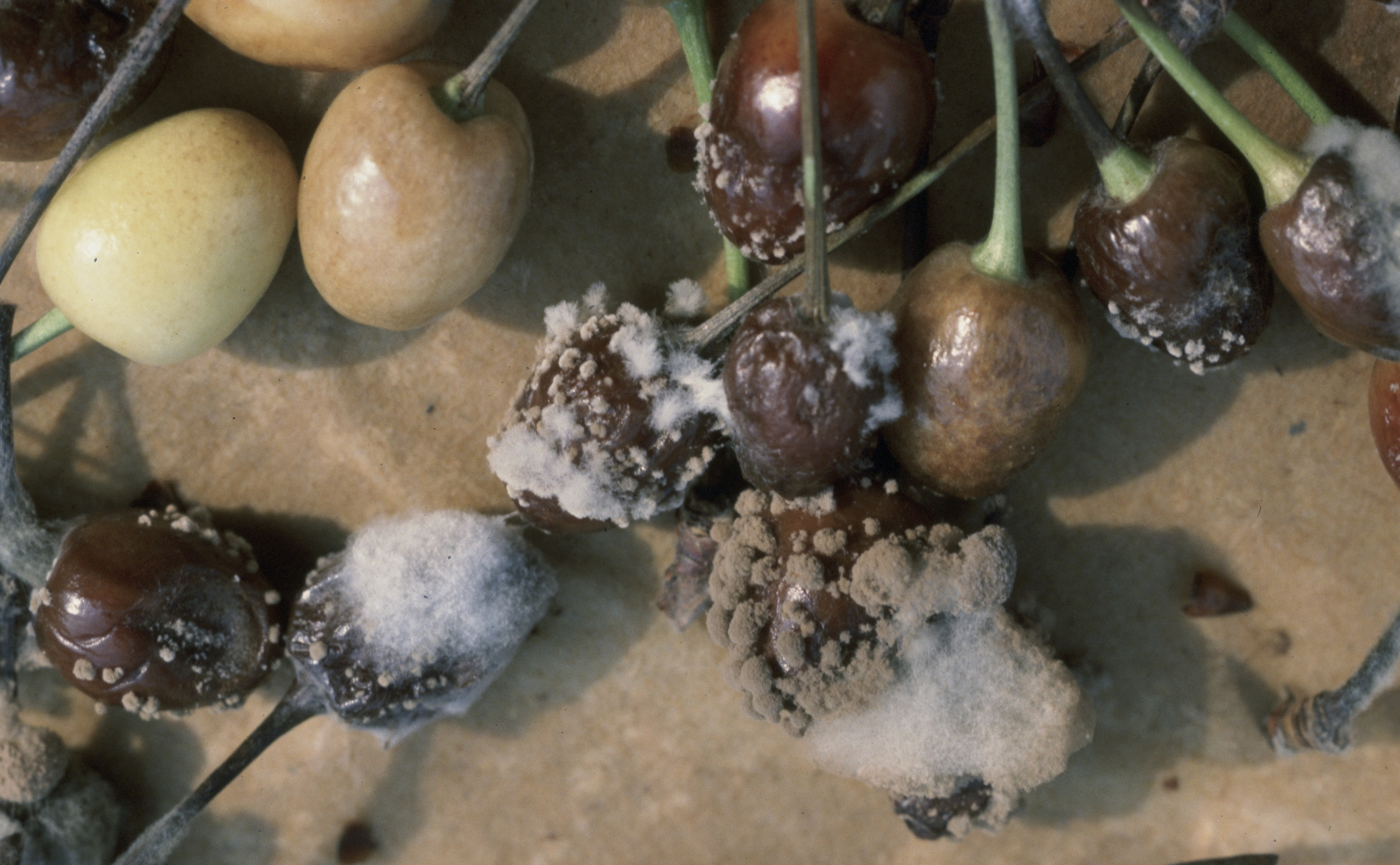
- Symptoms of brown rot on cherries

Scientific classification
- Domain: Eukaryota
- Kingdom: Fungi
- Division: Ascomycota
- Class: Leotiomycetes
- Order: Helotiales
- Family: Sclerotiniaceae
- Genus: Monilinia
- Species: M. fructicola

Binomial name
- Monilinia fructicola (G.Winter) Honey (1928)

Synonyms
- Ciboria fructicola G.Winter (1883); Monilia fructicola L.R.Batra (1991); Sclerotinia americana Norton & Ezekiel (1924); Sclerotinia fructicola (G.Winter) Rehm (1906)

= Monilinia fructicola =

Species of fungus

Monilinia fructicola is a species of fungus in the order Helotiales. A plant pathogen, it is the causal agent of brown rot of stone fruits.

== Stone fruit (summer fruit) ==
Stone fruits such as apricot and peaches originated in China and spread through old trade routes 3–4000 years ago. Nectarines are more recent (at least 2000 years). Cherries and European plums originated in Europe, although the Japanese plum originated in China.

Trees exposed to cold in autumn and early spring can develop cankers under the bark of the trunk or branches. Cankers are usually associated with the production of amber-coloured gum that contains bacteria and oozes on to the outer bark. Unfortunately, there are few control methods for fungal spores apart from copper sprays.

== Symptoms ==
Brown rot causes blossom blight, twig blight; twig canker and fruit rot. Brown rot is caused by a fungus that produces spores, and can be a major problem during particularly wet seasons. Prolonged wet weather during bloom may result in extensive blossom infection. The length of wet periods required for blossom infection depends upon the temperature. Humid wet conditions are when the fruit trees are most at risk from infection. Young green fruit can be infected just before autumn, but the infection often remains inactive until near maturity of the fruit. Brown rot can spread after harvest. Mature fruit can decay in only 2 days under warm conditions.

Blossom Blight: Infected blossoms wilt, shrivel and become covered with greyish mould. Petals may appear light brown or water-soaked. Blighted blossoms do not produce fruit. Dead blossoms may stick to spurs and twigs until harvest, providing a source of spores for the fruit rot phase.

Twig Blight and Canker: On peaches and apricots the infection may spread to twigs, causing brownish, oval cankers that may girdle and kill twigs.

== Fruit rot ==
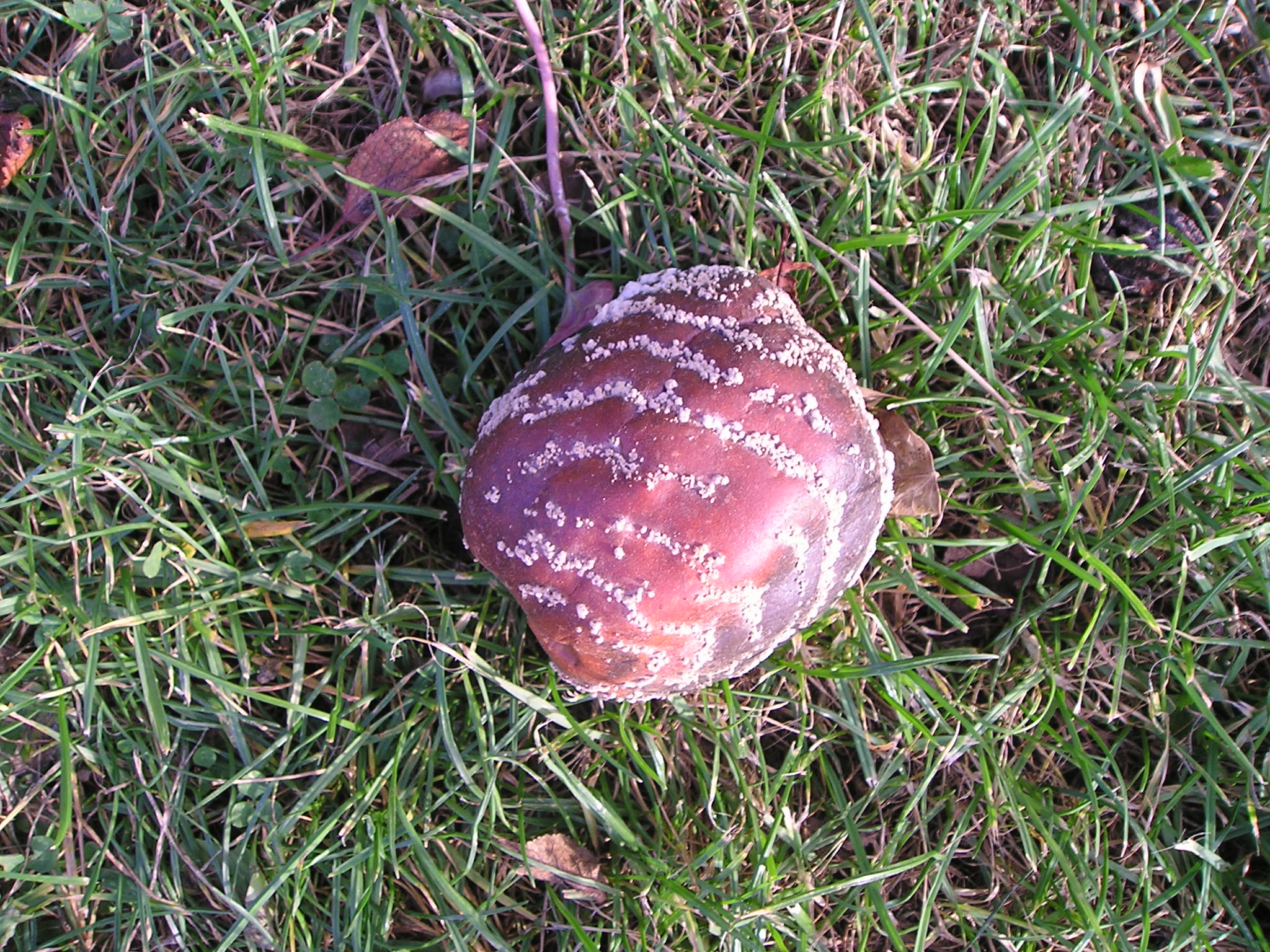
Brown rot on apple

Fruit rot appears as small, circular brown spots that increase rapidly in size causing the entire fruit to rot. Greyish spores appear in tufts on rotted areas. Infected fruit eventually turn into shrivelled, black mummies that may drop or remain attached to the tree through the winter. Brown rot can be serious on injured fruit such as cherries split by rain.

== Life cycle ==
Overwintering: The fungus over-winters in mummified fruit on the ground or in the tree and in twig cankers. Spring Infection: two types of spores are produced in spring which can infect blossoms. Conidia are produced on cankers and fruit mummies on the tree. Apothecia (small mushroom-like structures) form on mummies lying on the ground. The apothecia discharge ascospores during the bloom period, but don't contribute to fruit infection later in season. Secondary Infection: Spores produced on blighted blossoms provide a source of infection for ripening fruit. Infected fruit become covered with greyish spores which spread by wind and rain to healthy fruit. Insects may also contribute to the spread of brown rot spores.

== Plant defenses ==
A plant's first line of defense against infection is the physical barrier of the plant's “skin”, the epidermis of the primary plant body and the periderm of the secondary plant body. This first defense system, however, is not impenetrable. Viruses, bacteria, and the spores and hyphae of fungi can still enter the plant through injuries or through the natural openings in the epidermis, such as stomata. Once a pathogen invades, the plant mounts a chemical attack as a second line of defense that destroys the pathogens and prevents their spread from the site of infection. This second defense system is enhanced by the plant's inherited ability to recognize certain pathogens.

Elicitors: Oligosaccharins, derived from cellulose fragments released by cell wall damage, are one of the major classes of elicitors. Elicitors stimulate the production of antimicrobial compounds called phytoalexins. Infections also activate genes that produce PR proteins (pathogenesis-related proteins). Some of these proteins are antimicrobial, attacking molecules in the cell wall of a bacterium. Others may function as signals that spread “news” of the infection to nearby cells. Infection also stimulates the cross-linking of molecules in the cell wall and the deposition of lignin, responses that set up a local barricade that slows spread of the pathogen to other parts of the plant.

== Control ==
Orchard sanitation, removing fruit mummies and pruning any cankered or dead twigs will reduce inoculum levels, which will improve the effectiveness of fungicide sprays.

Primarily treatment is chemical; using fungicidal sprays to control the spread of the fungus. Spraying occurs during all phases, blossoms, green fruit, and mature fruit. Stone fruit trees' only natural defences are “skin” and chemical reactions to being attacked by the fungi, but this is a limited defence, so spraying and orchard sanitation are the best way to control spread of the fungus.
