= Monilinia laxa =

Scientific classification
- Kingdom: Fungi
- Division: Ascomycota
- Class: Leotiomycetes
- Order: Helotiales
- Family: Sclerotiniaceae
- Genus: Monilinia
- Species: M. laxa

Binomial name
- Monilinia laxa (Aderh. & Ruhland) Honey (1945)

Synonyms
- Monilia cinerea Oospora cinerea Sclerotinia cinerea Sclerotinia laxa

Species of fungus

Monilinia laxa is a plant pathogen that is the causal agent of brown rot of stone fruits.

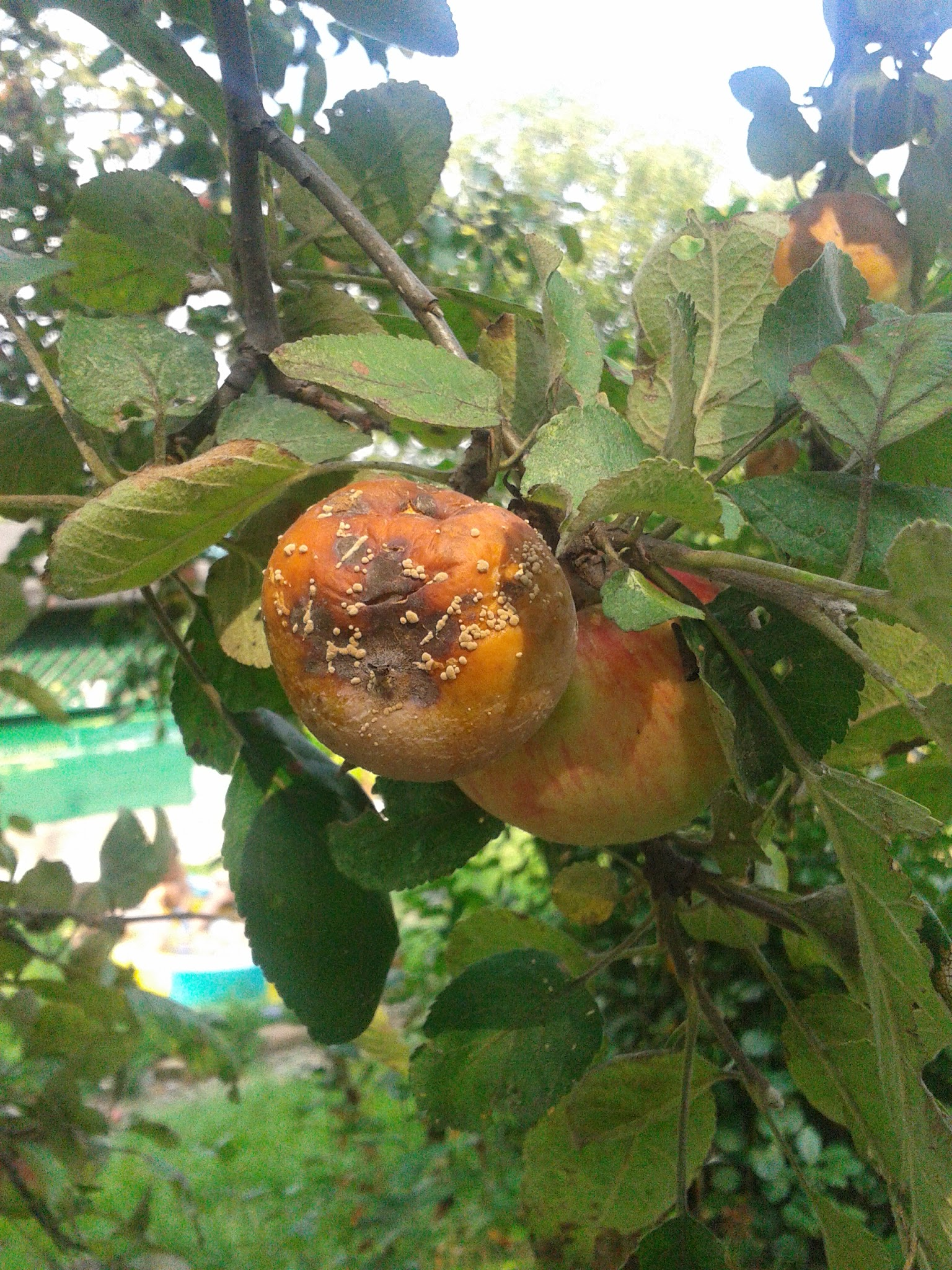
Typical Monilinia laxa infection of apple fruit

== Disease cycle ==
Monilinia laxa is an ascomycete fungus that is responsible for the brown rot blossom blight disease that infects many different types of stone fruit trees, such as apricots, cherries and peaches. It can also occasionally affect some pome fruits; for example, apples and pears. The pathogen overwinters on infected plant parts, particularly on infected twigs, branches, old flower parts or mummified fruits. In spring, the pathogen produces asexual conidia on the aforementioned infected plant debris. In addition, apothecia, which are small, open cup, mushroom-like sexual propagative structures of M. laxa that produce ascospores, also develop on the fallen fruits on the ground. Both asexual (conidia) and sexual (ascospores) spore types are spread during the spring via wind and rain in which they infect blossoms and young shoots. Floral tissue is the most susceptible to both spores’ infection when the trees are in full bloom. The infected floral tissues are responsible for the production of the secondary inoculums that further continues the disease cycle during the spring season. If the environmental conditions are very conducive (i.e. warm and wet environments), infection can also occur in non-flowering shoots or leaves. Infection is sometimes not visible until after the fruit begins to ripen and the pit hardens. These ripe fruits are at a high risk of being infected and passing the disease onto other plants during harvest.

== Importance ==
Throughout the entire world, brown rot is arguably the most common reason for crop loss of stone fruits both before and after harvest, especially in regions with warmer temperatures and wet climates.^{[5]} This disease has actually been shown to have a variety of incidence from year to year due to environmental variation. Before the discovery of extremely effective fungicides, when fruit ripened during a period of high rainfall, there were significant losses due to Brown rot blossom blight.^{[5]} After centuries of studying this disease in both Europe and North America, the use of fungicides have more recently become effective. Demethylation inhibitor (DMI) fungicides and Benzimidazole (BZI) fungicides are both examples of common fungicides that have been used to treat brown rot. However, since the beginning of these fungicides, another set of problems arose. After time, brown rot has become resistant to a few fungicides including both DMI and BZI. Luckily, scientists have been able to develop strategies for managing or delaying fungicide resistance to Brown rot blossom blight.^{[6]}

In addition to this, brown rot has been shown to be of serious economic importance even though it has been harder to estimate. Brown rot can cause detrimental losses to stone fruits in very wet seasons during flowering or immediately pre-harvest. Brown rot mostly occurs on maturing fruit close to harvest. Moreover, these losses may occur to fruit after postharvest. For example, post harvest decay of fruits have been approximated to be about 9% loss during transporting and marketing just in the US.

== Environment ==
Monilinia laxa proliferates the most in warm and wet weather. Therefore, it is unsurprising to find that it is most commonly found in California as well as the midwestern and northeastern states. Conversely, the disease has not been found in the southeastern states. Outside of the United States, M. laxa is commonly found in Europe, South Africa, and Chile.

Conidia begin to develop on infected plant debris once the temperature reaches 40 °F (4 °C). While infection does not occur below 50 °F (10 °C), it does occur once the temperature increases beyond that point. The ideal temperature for M. laxa infection is between 59–77 °F (15–25 °C). The spores produced by this pathogen can be dispersed by both wind and rain. However, the fungus is also able to proliferate in dry and highly humid conditions. Compared to in cooler conditions, at high humidity ash-gray-brown spore masses can form on the diseased flowers and twig cankers. Typically fruit susceptibility to brown rot increases about two to three weeks prior to harvest.
