= Brown rot =

Brown rot may refer to the following diseases:

- Wood-decay fungus, fungi that digest moist wood, causing rot, includes various species that infect living trees and cured wood
- Ralstonia solanacearum, an aerobic, non-sporing, plant pathogenic bacterium that causes brown rot in a wide range of crops
- Monilinia fructicola, a plant pathogenic fungus, the cause of brown rot in stone fruits, such as plums, peaches, nectarines and almonds
- Gnomoniopsis castaneae, a plant pathogenic fungus causing brown rot in chestnuts
- Almond brown rot caused by Monilinia fructicola
