= Chandler blueberry =

Blueberry cultivar

Vaccinium corymbosum 'Chandler'
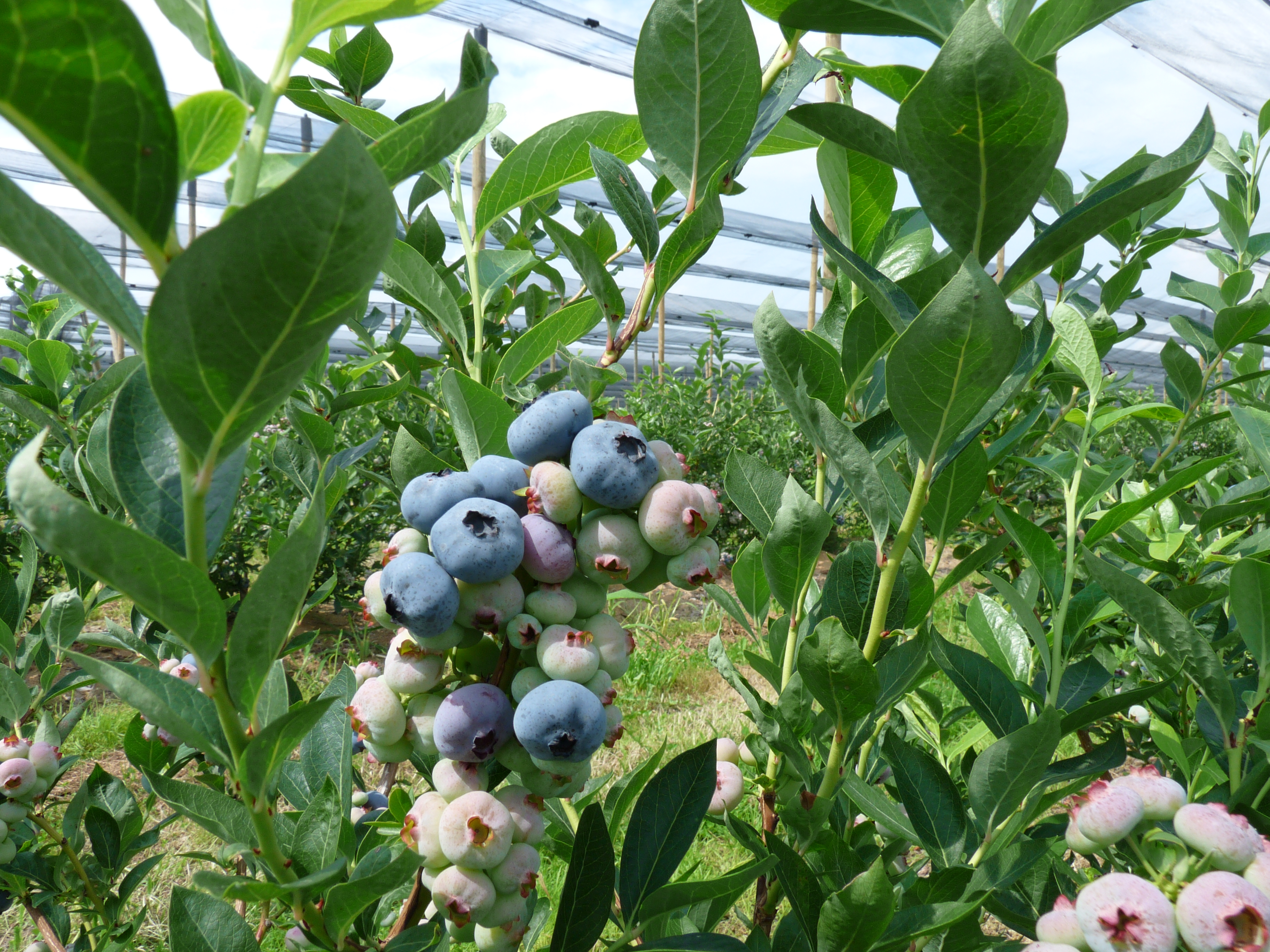
- Species: Vaccinium corymbosum
- Cultivar: 'Chandler'
- Breeder: USDA-ARS
- Origin: Corvallis, Oregon

The Chandler blueberry, also known as Vaccinium corymbosum 'Chandler' (blueberry), is a cultivar of blueberry which produces large berries. It was released in 1995 and was described by the United States Department of Agriculture as "a fresh market, local sales cultivar." Chandler blueberries come in relatively late in the harvest season. As the berries are quite large and slow to ripen, they are best picked by hand rather than by machine. The blueberry plant grows to about 5-8 feet in height and require a lot of moisture for growth.
