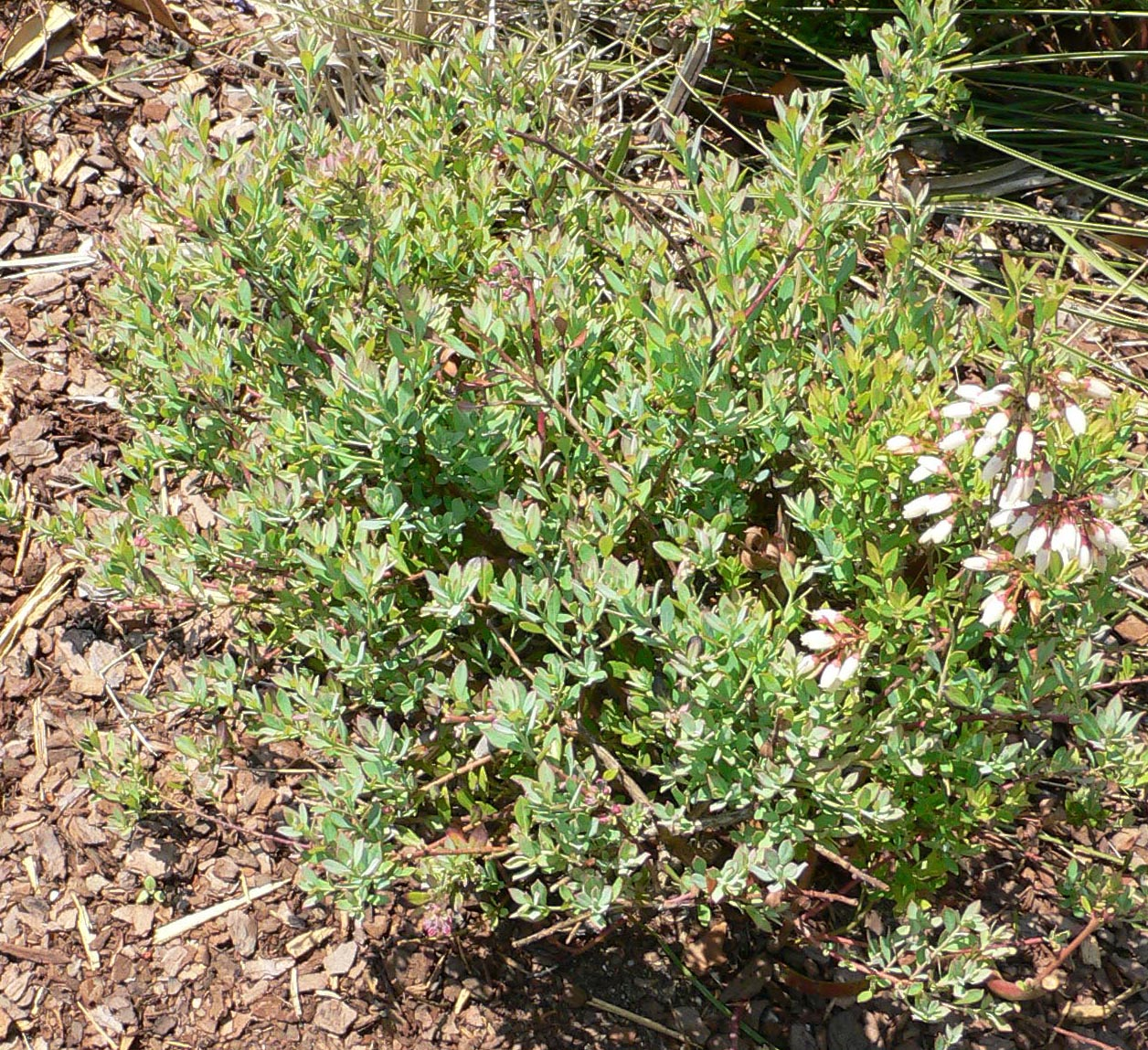

Conservation status
- Secure (NatureServe)

Scientific classification
- Kingdom: Plantae
- Clade: Tracheophytes
- Clade: Angiosperms
- Clade: Eudicots
- Clade: Asterids
- Order: Ericales
- Family: Ericaceae
- Genus: Vaccinium
- Section: Vaccinium sect. Cyanococcus
- Species: V. darrowii

Binomial name
- Vaccinium darrowii Camp 1942

Synonyms
- Vaccinium myrsinites var. glaucum A. Gray 1878 not. Vaccinium glaucum Lam. 1783

= Vaccinium darrowii =

Berry and plant

Vaccinium darrowii, with the common names Darrow's blueberry, evergreen blueberry, scrub blueberry, is a species of Vaccinium in the blueberry group (Vaccinium sect. Cyanococcus).

== Description ==
Vaccinium darrowii is an evergreen shrub growing to 30–120 cm (1–4 ft) tall, with small, simple ovoid-acute leaves 10–15 millimetres (3/8–5/8 in) long and in non-hybrid forms are a light blue-green color on the base of the plant and a light pink color at the tips of the branches.

The flowers are white, bell-shaped, 4–8 mm long. The fruit is a berry 4–6 mm (1/8–1/4 in) diameter, blue-black with a whitish waxy bloom. Cytology is 2n = 24.

== Distribution and habitat ==
Vaccinium darrowii is native to the Southeastern United States, in Alabama, Florida, Georgia, Louisiana, and Mississippi. The primary habitat for the species is pine forests, where it prefers full sun and the slightly acidic soils common in such habitat.

== Cultivation ==
Vaccinium darrowii is grown both for its edible berries, and for horticultural uses as an ornamental plant in home gardens, native plant and wildlife gardens, and natural landscaping projects.

=== Hybrid cultivars ===
Many commercial Southern Highbush Blueberry cultivars are hybrids, derived from crosses between Vaccinium darrowii with the Northern Highbush Blueberry (Vaccinium corymbosum), as well as other species such as Rabbiteye blueberry (Vaccinium virgatum) and Lowbush blueberry (Vaccinium angustifolium).

Southern Highbush Cultivars, in addition to lower chilling requirements, also have greater tolerance to high summer temperatures, somewhat greater drought tolerance and develop superior fruit quality under Southern U.S. growing conditions. As a rule, Southern highbush blueberries are self-fertile. However, larger and earlier-ripening berries result if several cultivars are interplanted for cross-pollination.

The following Southern Highbush Blueberry cultivars, listed by fruit ripening time, are recommended for the fruit garden and landscape:

- Very early season: 'O'Neal'
- Early/midseason: 'Cape Fear'
- Midseason: 'Blue Ridge' and 'Georgia Gem' (adapted to the Sandhills and Coastal Plains; needs frost protection in the Piedmont)
- Mid/late season: 'Legacy' and 'Summit'
- Late season: 'Ozarkblue' (Piedmont only)

== See also ==
- Huckleberry
