= Duke blueberry =

Blueberry cultivar

Vaccinium corymbosum 'Duke'
- Species: Vaccinium corymbosum
- Cultivar: 'Duke'
- Breeder: USDA
- Origin: Beltsville, Maryland

The Duke blueberry, also known as Vaccinium 'Duke', is a cultivar of northern highbush blueberry released in 1987. It is a tetraploid cultivar, derived mostly from Vaccinium corymbosum with a 4 percent contribution of Vaccinium angustifolium. Its parentage includes the cultivars 'Ivanhoe' and 'Earliblue'

It has gained the Royal Horticultural Society's Award of Garden Merit.
