= Heinrich Georg Winter =

German mycologist

Heinrich Georg Winter (1 October 1848 in Leipzig – 16 August 1887) was a German mycologist.

Beginning in 1870, he studied natural sciences at Leipzig University, the Ludwig-Maximilians-Universität München, and the University of Halle, obtaining his habilitation in 1875 from the Polytechnic Confederation in Zurich.

He is the taxonomic authority of Sordariaceae, a family of perithecial fungi. In 1880, he described the order Ustilaginales (smut fungi). He also conducted anatomical and morphological research of crustose lichens. and was editor of several exsiccatae. Two examples are the large specimen series named L. Rabenhorstii fungi Europaei et extraeuropaei exsiccati, Klotzschii herbarii vivi mycologici continuatio. Editio nova. Series secunda (1881–1886). and the exsiccata Schweizerische Kryptogamen. Unter Mitwirkung mehrerer Botaniker. Gesammelt und herausgegeben von Dr. B. Wartmann und B. Schenk (1880-1882), which he issued together with Friedrich Bernhard Wartmann.

From 1871 to 1879, he was co-editor of the journal "Hedwigia", from 1879 until his death, he served as its editor. With Anton de Bary and Heinrich Rehm, he was co-author of Die Pilze Deutschlands, Oesterreichs und der Schweiz.
