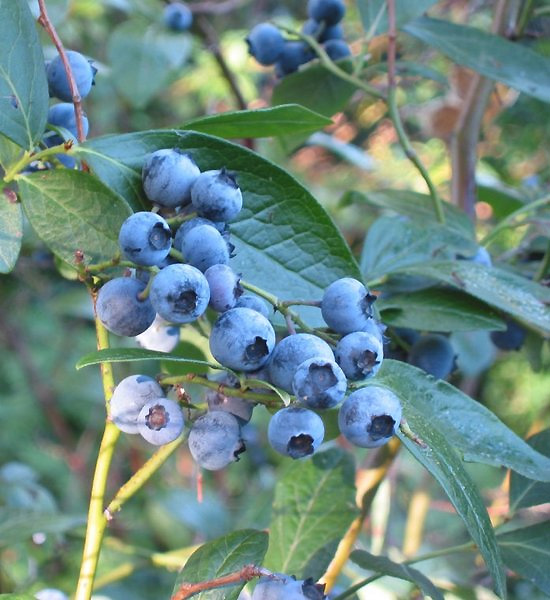
- Leaves and berries

Scientific classification
- Kingdom: Plantae
- Clade: Embryophytes
- Clade: Tracheophytes
- Clade: Angiosperms
- Clade: Eudicots
- Clade: Asterids
- Order: Ericales
- Family: Ericaceae
- Genus: Vaccinium
- Section: Vaccinium sect. Cyanococcus
- Species: V. corymbosum

Binomial name
- Vaccinium corymbosum L. 1753

Synonyms
- Cyanococcus corymbosus (L.) Rydb.; Vaccinium albiflorum Hook.

= Vaccinium corymbosum =

Species of plant

Vaccinium corymbosum is a North American species of blueberry with several common names, including highbush blueberry and rabbiteye blueberry.

The species became commonly cultivated as a fresh fruit crop in the 20th century, with dozens of commercial cultivars. It can be used as an ornamental hedge as well a food source for humans and wildlife.

== Description ==
Vaccinium corymbosum is a deciduous shrub growing to 1.8–3.7 metres (6–12 ft) tall and wide. It is often found in dense thickets. The dark glossy green leaves are elliptical and up to 5 centimetres (2 in) long. In autumn, the leaves turn to a brilliant red, orange, yellow, and/or purple.

The flowers are long bell- or urn-shaped white to very light pink, 8.5 mm (1/3 in) long. The fruit is a blue-black berry with a 6.4–12.7 mm (1/4–1/2 in) diameter.

The species is tetraploid and does not self-pollinate. Most cultivars have a chilling requirement greater than 800 hours. Cytology is 2n = 48.

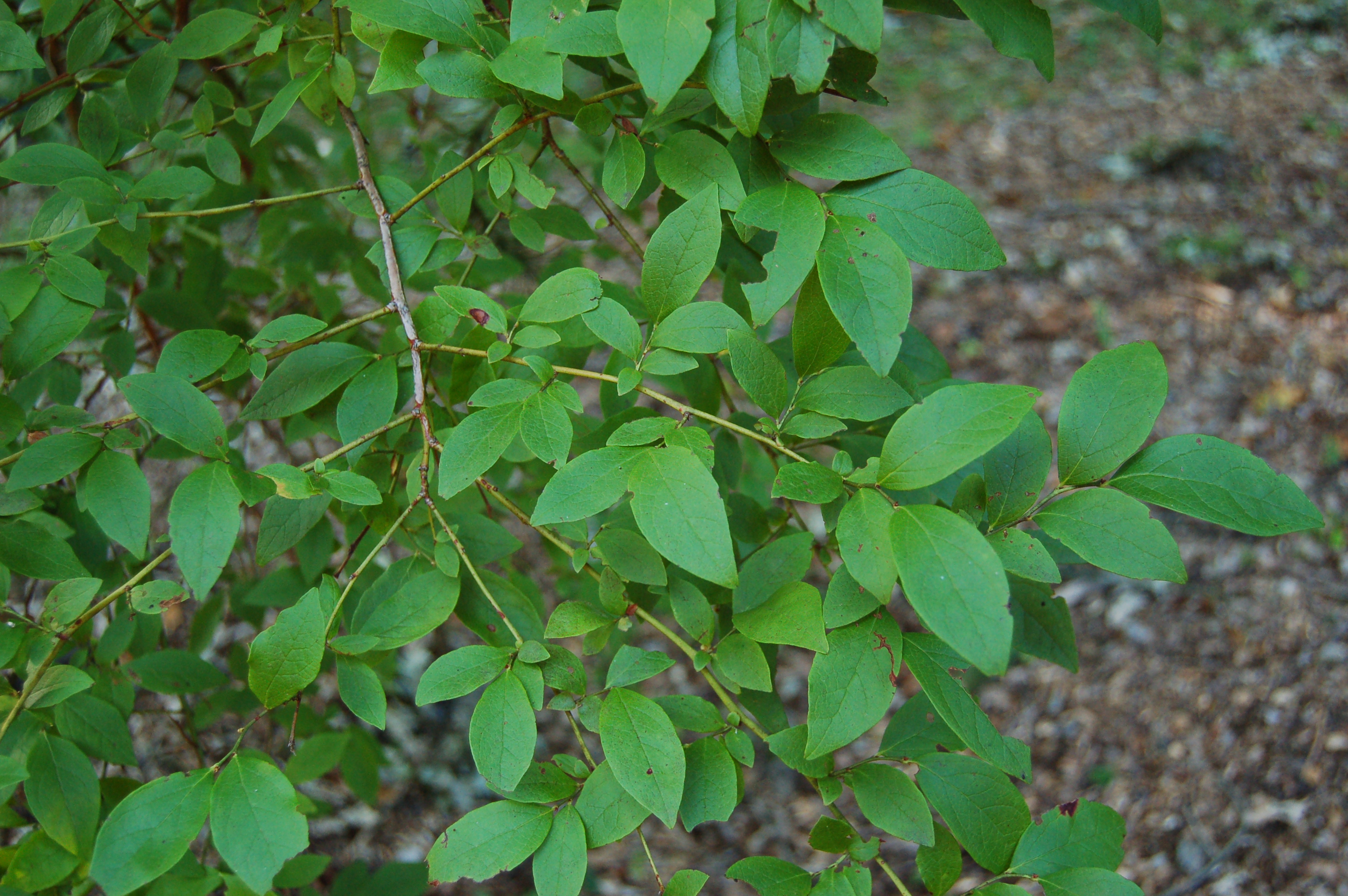
Foliage

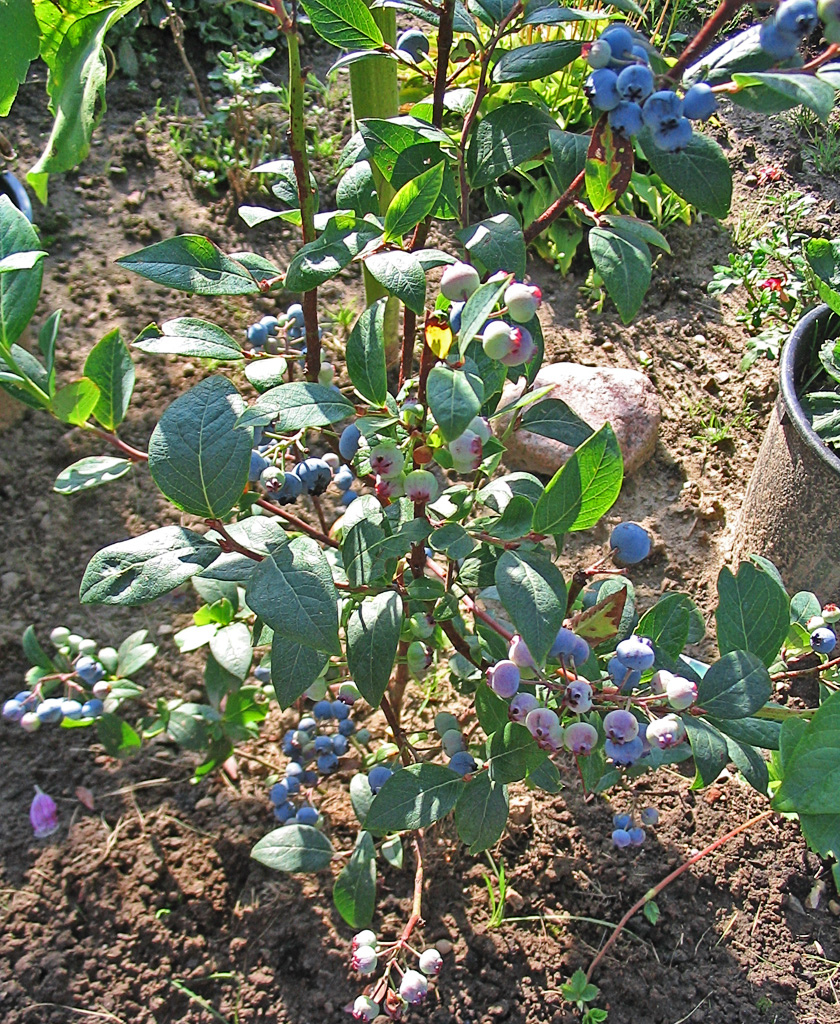
Young shrub with fruit

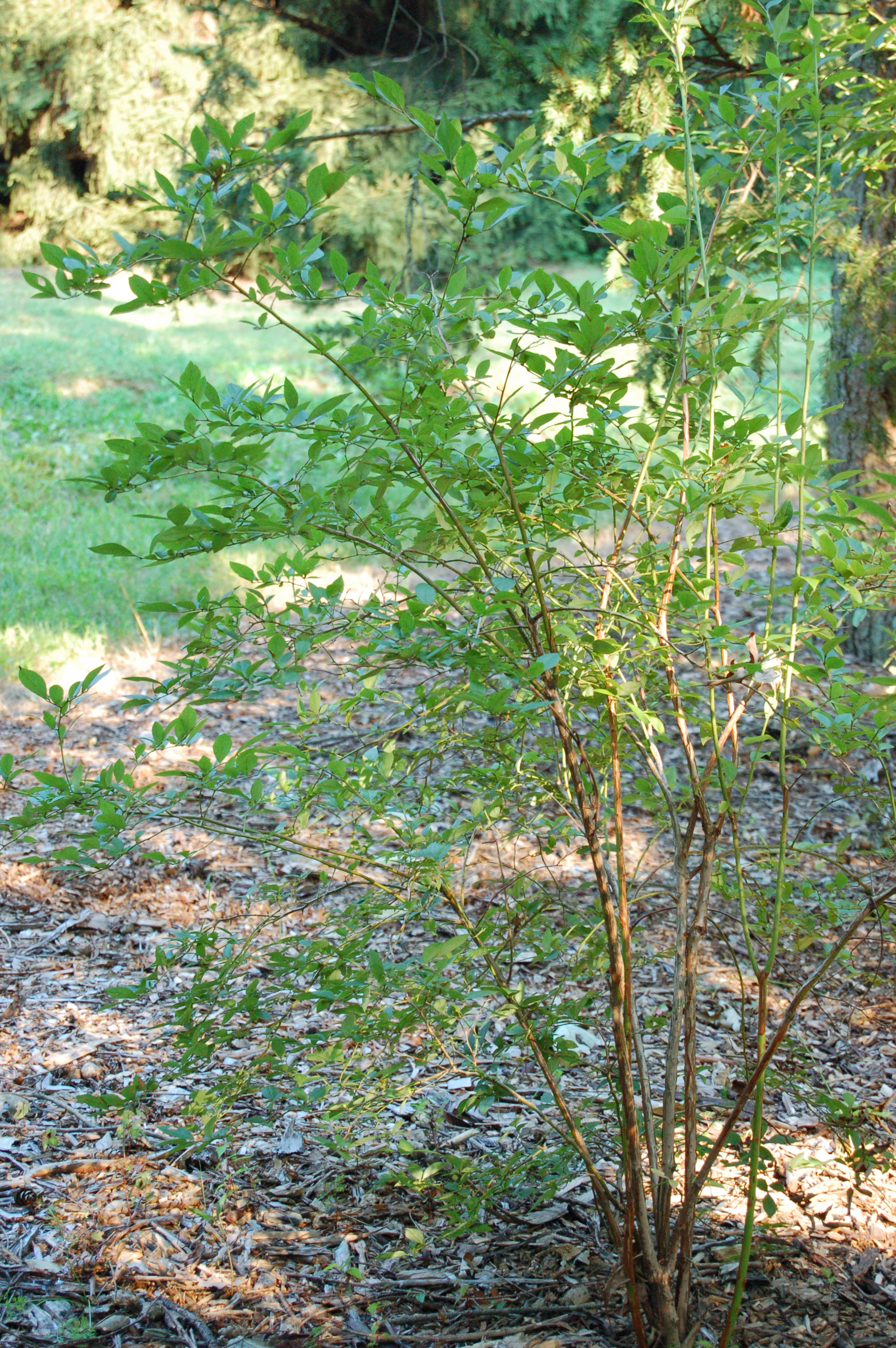
Mature shrub

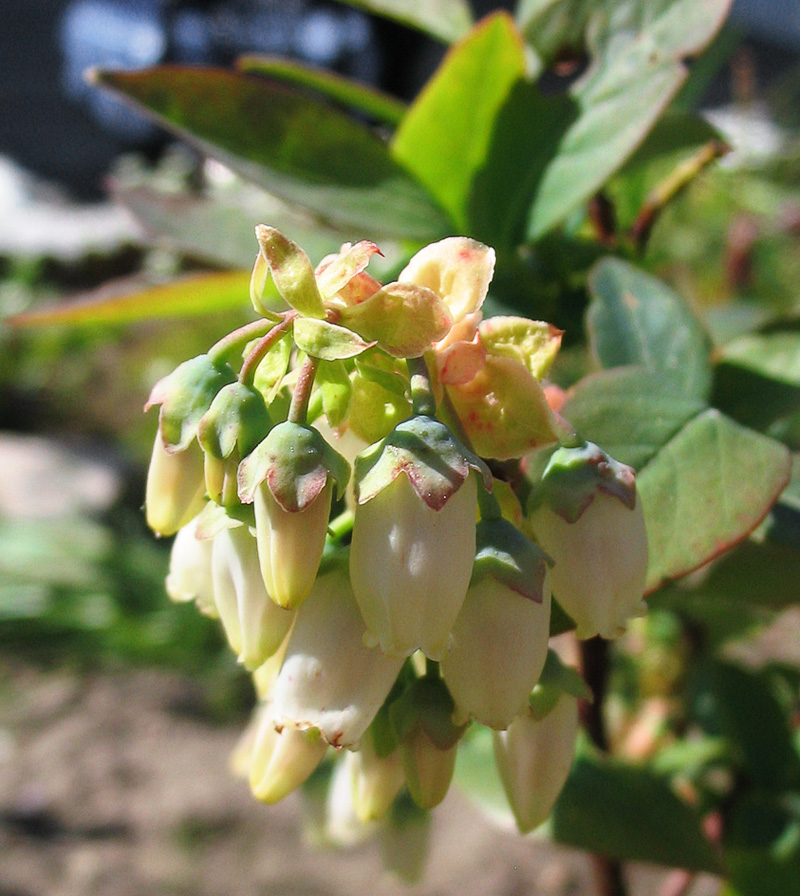
Flowers

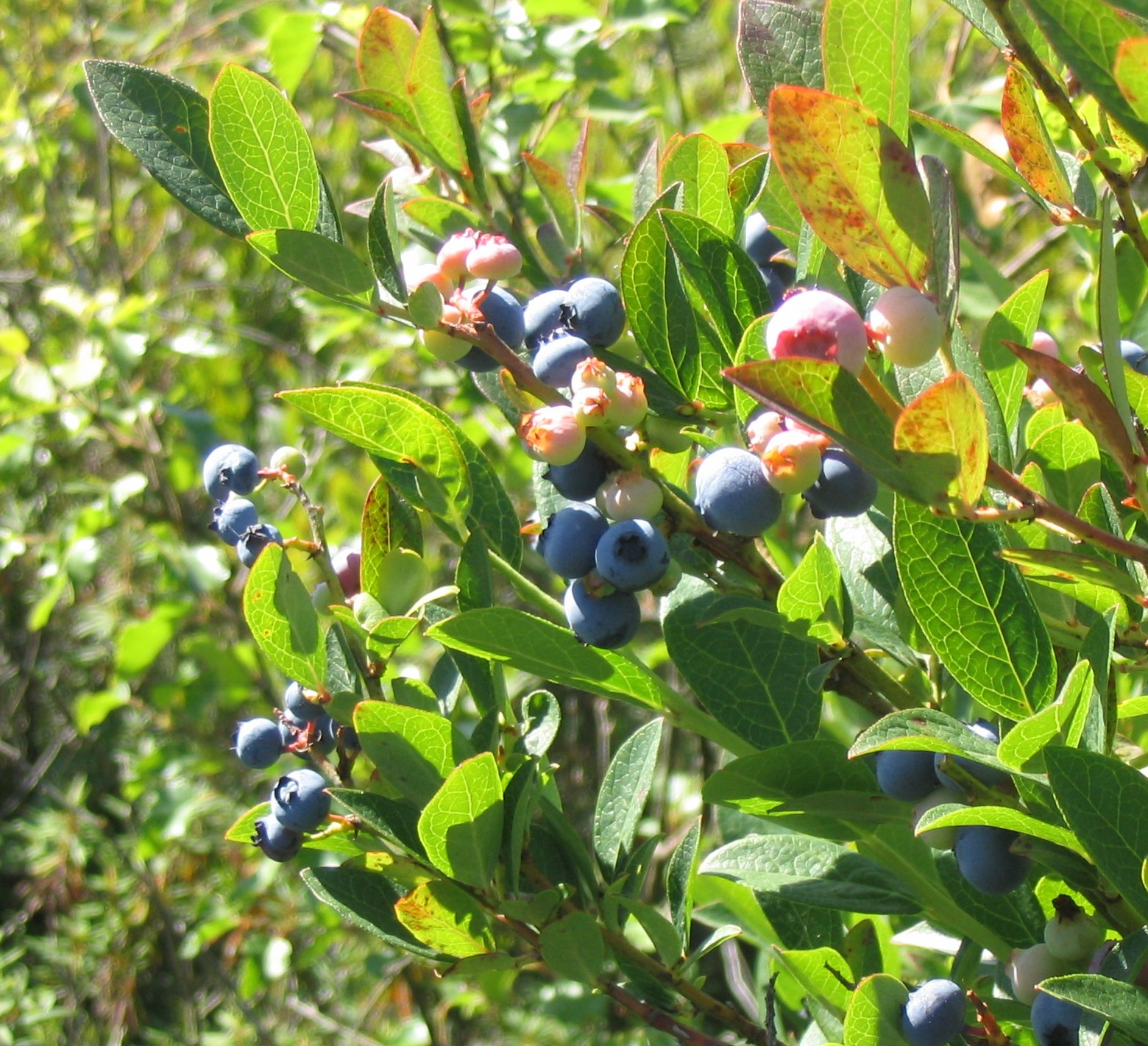
Berries, ripe and unripe

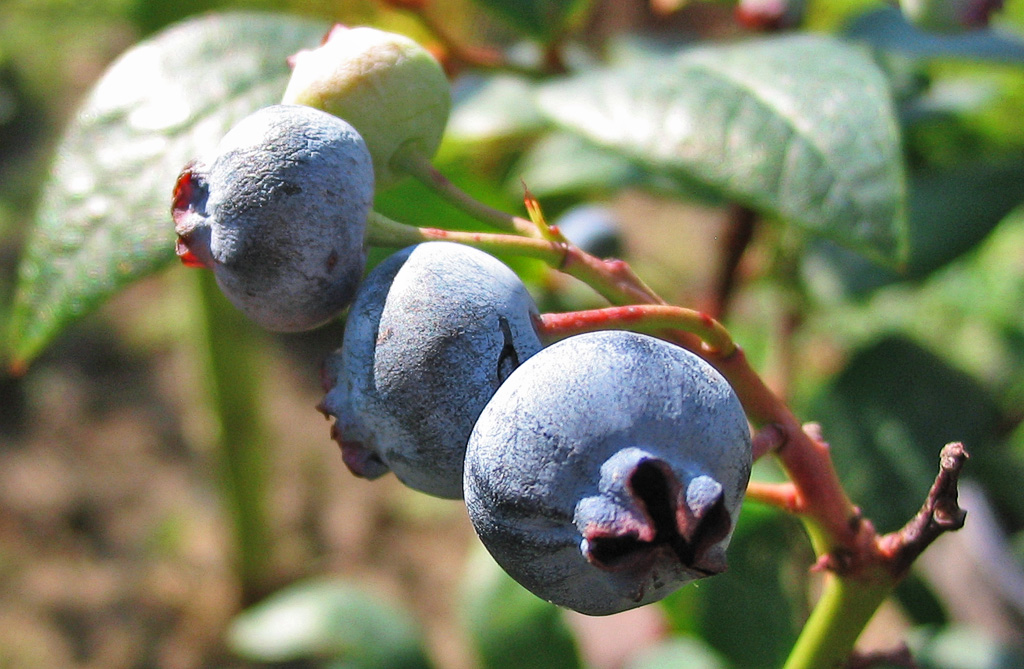
Berry close-up

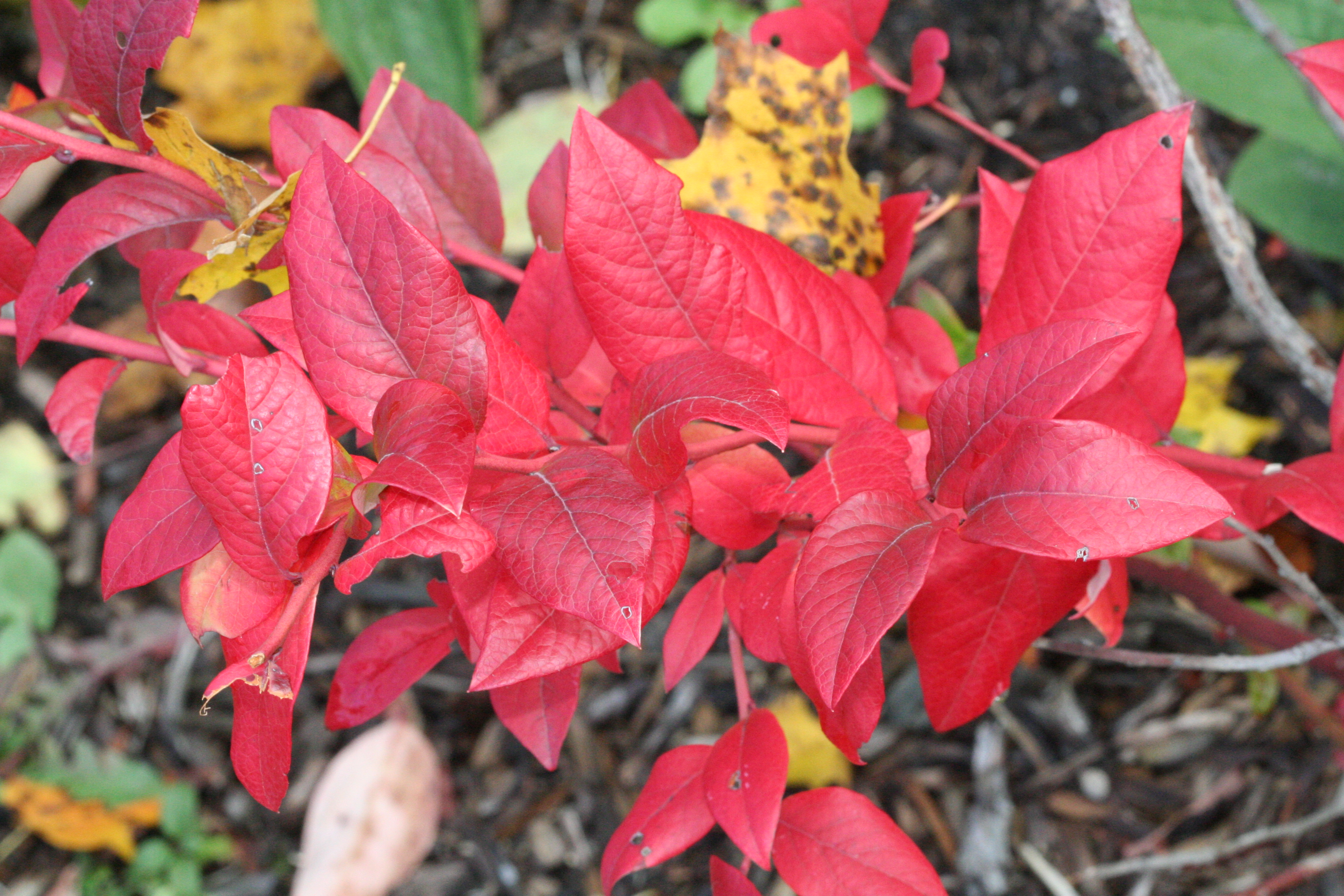
Autumn leaves

== Distribution and habitat ==
It is native to eastern Canada and the eastern and southern United States, from Ontario east to Nova Scotia and south as far as Florida and eastern Texas. It is also naturalized in other places, including Europe, Japan, New Zealand, and the North American Pacific Northwest.

The plant is found in wooded or open habitats with moist acidic soils.

== Ecology ==
In natural habitats, the berries are a food source for native and migrating birds, bears, and small mammals. The foliage is browsed by deer and rabbits.

== Cultivation ==
Many wild species of Vaccinium are thought to have been cultivated by Native Americans for thousands of years, with intentional crop burnings in northeastern areas being apparent from archeological evidence. V. corymbosum, being one of the species likely used by these peoples, was later studied and domesticated in 1908 by Elizabeth Coleman White and Frederick Vernon Coville. It became commonly cultivated as a fresh fruit crop in the 20th century and the most common commercially grown blueberry in North America.

It is also cultivated as an ornamental plant for home and wildlife gardens and natural landscaping projects. The soil pH must be very acidic (4.5 to 5.5). It can be used as an ornamental hedge.

=== Cultivars ===
Dozens of commercial cultivars exist. Some common examples are listed here, grouped by approximate start of the harvest season:

Early

- Duke
- Patriot
- Reka
- Spartan

Mid-season

- Bluecrop
- Blu-ray
- KaBluey
- Northland

Late

- Aurora
- Darrow
- Elliott
- Jersey
- Chandler

The cultivars Duke and Spartan have gained the Royal Horticultural Society's Award of Garden Merit.

=== Southern highbush blueberry ===
Some plants named southern highbush blueberry are hybridized forms derived from crosses between V. corymbosum and V. darrowii, a native of the Southeastern US. These hybrids and other cultivars of V. darrowii (southern highbush blueberry) have been developed for cultivation in warm southern and western regions of North America.

== Uses ==
The edible berries were collected and used in Native American cuisine in areas where V. corymbosum grew natively.

== See also ==
- Blueberry § Origins
- Huckleberry
