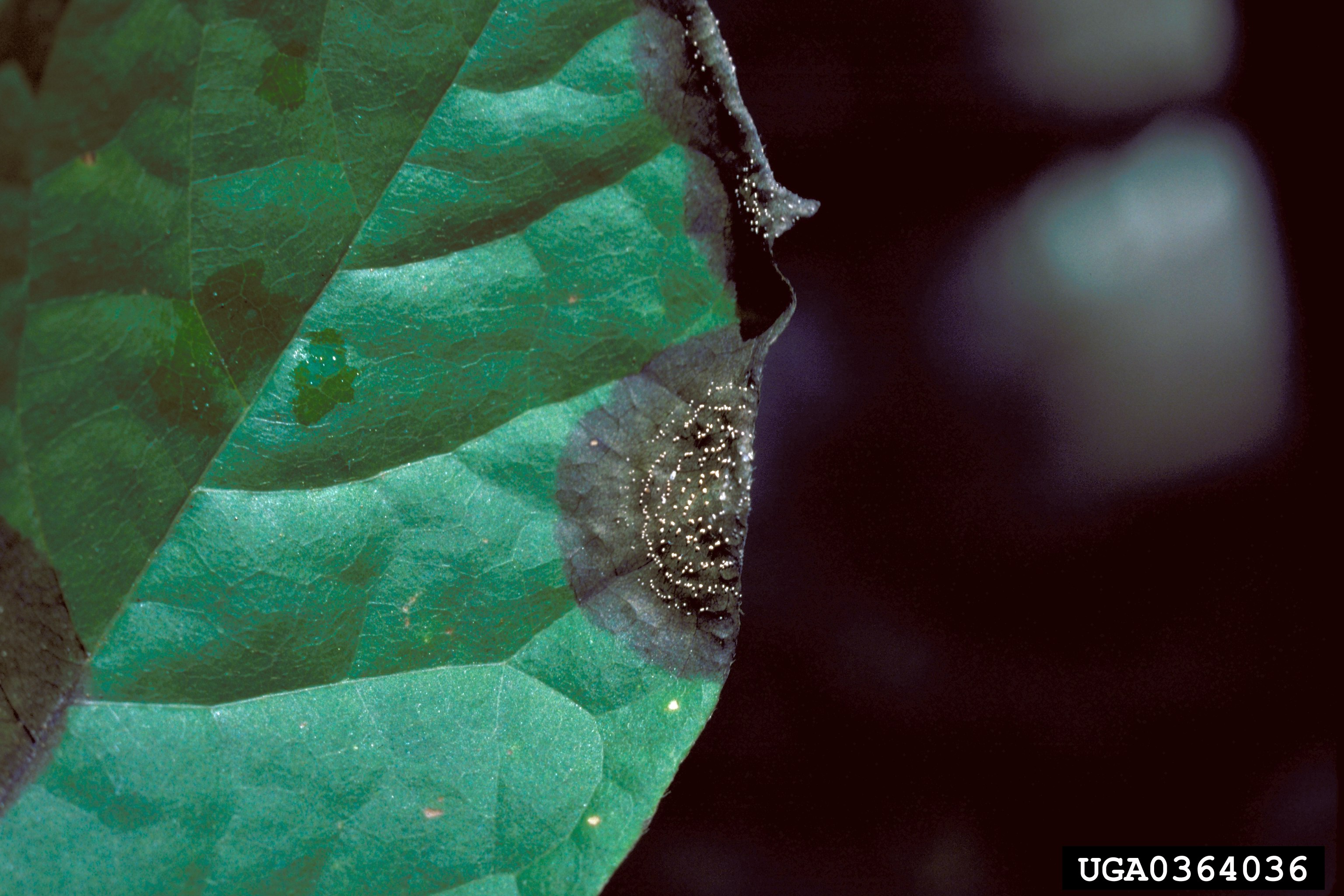

Scientific classification
- Kingdom: Fungi
- Division: Ascomycota
- Class: Sordariomycetes
- Order: Glomerellales
- Family: Glomerellaceae
- Genus: Colletotrichum
- Species: C. acutatum

Binomial name
- Colletotrichum acutatum J.H. Simmonds (1968)

Synonyms
- Colletotrichum acutatum J.H. Simmonds (1965); Glomerella acutata Guerber & J.C. Correll, (2001)

= Colletotrichum acutatum =

Species of fungus

Colletotrichum acutatum is a plant pathogen and endophyte. It is the organism that causes the most destructive fungal disease, anthracnose, of lupin species worldwide. It also causes the disease postbloom fruit drop on many varieties of citrus, especially Valencia and navel oranges in Florida.

== Host and symptoms ==
Colletotrichum acutatum has a broad host range, but is most important in strawberries. The pathogen causes black spot of fruit, but can also be seen attacking the plant at its crowns, roots and leaves. After planting, stunting and yellowing as well as wilting may occur. General symptoms of the disease in other plants can also be seen on flowers, petioles, and roots. Stems are also a prominent place to see symptoms. Lesions on the stem can appear dark colored, oval shaped, and possibly have immersed spots located on petioles and runners. Once C. acutatum infects these parts of the plant, it can cause other diseases to develop such as crown root rot, defoliation, bloom blight and fruit rot. The most significant loss can be seen once the fruit is attacked. If the fruit is infected it will develop small brown spots (green fruit) or black spots (red fruit) and can expand throughout the fruits' surface.

== Environment ==
This pathogen has a wide geographical distribution. Strains of the pathogen are present throughout various climates worldwide. Temperature can affect how symptoms appear on the host. Optimal temperature for growth of C. acutatum is 25 degrees Celsius. For instance, in weather with high humidity, orange colored spores appear on the hosts' lesions. Specifically in strawberries, this disease appears to be more harmful in warm climates. Transference of disease occurs when conidia are spread by water, specifically rain or irrigation water. Another way of contamination is from infected equipment or wind.

== Taxonomic history ==
Historically fungi that were pathogenic on different plants were often given different names, even though they often had near identical morphology. In 1957, Josef Adolf von Arx synonymized about 600 fungal species names as Colletotrichum gloeosporioides. In 1965 C. gloeosporioides strains that had acute conidia and slower growth were renamed as Colletotrichum acutatum. With the invention of easy and affordable DNA sequencing technologies, species identification switched from being based on morphology to being based on a combination of morphology and molecular phylogenetics. In 2012 the C. acutatum species was split up into more than two dozen new species, and is now referred to as the C. acutatum species complex. The C. acutatum species complex still includes a species called C. acutatum, but it is now defined more narrowly than it had been from 1965 to 2012.

== As a biocontrol agent ==
This fungus attacks the Australian species Hakea sericea in South Africa, where this shrub is an invasive species. For this reason, local researchers have been investigating the application of this fungus as a means of biological control.

== Pest management ==
=== Cultural control ===
Sanitation is critical in controlling the disease. Thoroughly washing plants by removing all the dirt could reduce occurrence. This method has also been demonstrated to reduce pests such has anthracnose. Proper sanitation of equipment could reduce exposure of contracting the pathogen. This would be equipment used in transportation, packing, storage, etc. Crop rotation, as well as the removal of weeds is also helpful in reducing the pathogen in the soil. Removing weeds from the field is a critical step; the pathogen on the dead weeds could still produce spores.

=== Chemical control ===
A common method of control for this disease is the use of fungicides. Fungicides are soil fumigants that are used to decrease amount of inoculum in the soil. Chloropicrin, a fungicide, has seen good results with regular application. Unfortunately, relying on just one fungicide heavily can increase the disease's tolerance. Moreover, the timing of the application is very crucial. With poorly timed applications, there could be an increase of disease severity due to the disturbance of natural biocontrol mechanisms and increased crop susceptibility. Pest control is also crucial in the containment of the disease. After rainfall or irrigation, anthracnose symptoms may occur. Using foliar fungicide can help prevent spread of the disease and minimize anthracnose.
