= Edwin Earle Honey =

American plant pathologist and mycologist

Edwin Earle Honey (May 2, 1891 – October 31, 1956) was an American plant pathologist and mycologist. In 1936, he formally described the fungus and plant pathogen Monilinia azaleae, which preys upon crops and other plants in the families Rosaceae and Ericaceae.

Honey was born in Illinois. He was married first to Mary Luella Trowbridge, and later to Mrs. Ruth R. Honey.

In 1920 Honey lived in Champaign, Illinois; and in 1935 he lived in Madison, Wisconsin. Depending on where he was employed, Honey also lived for times in Shorewood, Wisconsin, Philadelphia, and New York state.

Honey received his B.S. degree in plant pathology from Cornell University in 1916, and was a member of the Sigma Xi (ΣΞ), an international honor society for scholars in fields of science or engineering.

Starting in 1948, and until his death in 1956, Honey was a plant pathologist in the Extension Division of Pennsylvania State University. Honey's personal collection of fungi is kept at the Cornell Plant Pathology Herbarium (CUP), under the prefix CUP-H.

== Bibliography ==
Honey published professionally under the names Edwin E. Honey or E. E. Honey. This is a partial list of his writings:

=== Books ===
- E. E. Honey (1920s). Translations on the Sclerotinia.
- Edwin E. Honey (1928). Dark-field microscopy in the study of fungi.
- Edwin E. Honey (1931). Mycologia postillas para aula practica (in Spanish).
- Edwin E. Honey (1931). Mycologia texto segunda parte sobre basidiomycetos, fungi imperfeiti (in Spanish).
- Edwin E. Honey (1931). Mycologia texto primeira parte sobre myxomycetos, schizomycetos, phycomycetos, ascomycetos (in Spanish).
- Edwin E. Honey (1944). Tree diseases.
- Edwin E. Honey (1945). Emergency plant disease prevention project in Wisconsin.
- Edwin E. Honey (1954). Distribution and Prevention of Oak Wilt.

=== Journal articles ===
- Edwin E. Honey and W. R. Fisher (March–April 1928). "Dark-Field Microscopy in the Study of Fungi". Mycologia. 20 (2). Mycological Society of America: 88–96. doi:10.2307/3753753. JSTOR 3753753.
- Edwin E. Honey (May–June 1928). "The Monilioid Species of Sclerotinia". Mycologia. 20 (3). Mycological Society of America: 127–157. doi:10.2307/3753973. JSTOR 3753973.
- Edwin E. Honey (February 1936). "North American Species of Monilinia. I. Occurrence, Grouping, and Life-Histories". American Journal of Botany. 23 (2). Botanical Society of America: 100–106. doi:10.2307/2436302. JSTOR 2436302.
- E. E. Honey (1940). "Monilinia causing a brown rot and blight of the common Azalea". Phytopathology. 30 (6): 537–538. ISSN 0031-949X.
- Edwin E. Honey (1944). "Tree diseases observed in Wisconsin". Plant Disease Reporter. 28: 172–180.
