= List of almond diseases =

This article is a list of diseases of almonds (Prunus dulcis).

== Bacterial diseases ==
Leaf scorch/Golden death	Xylella fastidiosa
Bacterial blast	Pseudomonas syringae
Bacterial canker	Pseudomonas syringae pv. syringae
Bacterial hyperplastic canker	Pseudomonas amygdali
Bacterial spot	Xanthomonas pruni (syn. X. campestris pv. pruni)
Crown gall	Agrobacterium tumefaciens

=== Mycoplasmal diseases ===
Brown line and decline	See § Peach yellow leaf roll phytoplasma. Called Peach yellow leafroll mycoplasma in some sources.

=== Phytoplasmal diseases ===
Brown line and decline Kernel shrivel	Peach yellow leaf roll phytoplasma
European stone fruit yellows	European stone fruit yellows phytoplasma
Western X disease	Western-X phytoplasma

== Fungal diseases ==
For treatment in the US, see Fungicide use in the United States#Almonds.

Alternaria leaf spot	Alternaria alternata
Anthracnose	Colletotrichum acutatum
Armillaria root rot	Armillaria mellea; Rhizomorpha subcorticalis [anamorph]
Band canker = Dothiorella canker	Botryosphaeria dothidea; Dothiorella sp. [anamorph]
Fusarium root rot	Fusarium spp.
Brown rot	Monilinia fructicola
Brown rot blossom blight or "brown rot"	Monilinia laxa; Monilinia sp. [anamorph]
Ceratocystis canker	Ceratocystis fimbriata
Green fruit rot	Botrytis cinerea; Botryotinia fuckeliana [teleomorph]; Monilinia fructicola; Monilinia laxa; Monilinia sp. [anamorph]; Sclerotinia sclerotiorum
Hull rot	Monilinia spp.; Monilinia fructicola; Monilinia laxa; Rhizopus arrhizus; Rhizopus circinans; Rhizopus stolonifer
Kernel decay	Aspergillus niger; A. flavus; A. parasiticus
Leaf blight	Discostroma corticola; Seimatosporium lichenicola [anamorph]
Leaf curl	Taphrina deformans
Leucostoma canker	Leucostoma cincta; Leucocytospora cincta [anamorph]; Leucostoma persoonii; Leucocytospora leucostoma [anamorph]
Phomopsis canker and fruit rot	Phomopsis amygdali; = Fusicoccum amygdali
Phytophthora root and crown rot	Phytophthora spp.; Phytophthora cactorum; Phytophthora cambivora; Phytophthora cinnamomi; Phytophthora citricola; Phytophthora citrophthora; Phytophthora cryptogea; Phytophthora drechsleri; Phytophthora megasperma; Phytophthora nicotianae var. parasitica; Phytophthora syringae
Powdery mildew	Podosphaera spp.
Pythium root rot	Pythium spp.
Red leaf blotch	Polystigma ochraceum
Rust = Stone fruit rust	Tranzschelia discolor
Scab	Venturia carpophila; Cladosporium carpophilum [anamorph]
Shot hole	Wilsonomyces carpophilus; = Stigmina carpophila
Silver leaf	Chondrostereum purpureum
Verticillium wilt = Blackheart	Verticillium dahliae

== Nematode diseases ==
Nematode diseases of almond include:

Dagger nematode	Xiphinema americanum
Ring nematode	Mesocriconema xenoplax
Root-knot nematode	Meloidogyne arenaria; Meloidogyne hapla; Meloidogyne incognita; Meloidogyne javanica
Root-lesion nematode	Pratylenchus penetrans; Pratylenchus vulnus

== Viral diseases ==
Viruses infecting almond include:

Calico	genus Ilarvirus, Prunus necrotic ringspot virus (PNRSV)
Enation	genus Nepovirus, Tomato black ring virus (TBRV)
Infectious bud failure	genus Ilarvirus, Prunus necrotic ringspot virus (PNRSV)
Peach mosaic	Cherry mottle leaf virus
Peach yellow bud mosaic	genus Nepovirus, Tomato ringspot virus (ToRSV)

== Miscellaneous diseases and disorders ==
Unknown or non-infectious disorders include:

Bryobia mite	insect infestation
Corky growth (on leaves)	Physiological
Corky spot (on kernels)	Unknown
Foamy canker	Unknown
Noninfectious bud failure = Crazy top	Genetic
Nonproductive syndrome = Bull trees	Unknown
Union mild etch	Unknown
