= Fungicide use in the United States =

This article summarizes different crops, what common fungal problems they have, and how fungicide should be used in order to mitigate damage and crop loss. This page also covers how specific fungal infections affect crops present in the United States.

== Almonds ==
=== Alternaria leaf spot ===
Symptoms of Alternaria leaf spot appear as lesions with tan spots on the leaves. The centers of these lesions become black with fungal sporulation. This infection can lead to tree death within 3–4 years of the first serious outbreak. Orchards in high humidity areas result in the largest yield loss, often in excess of 50%. Yield loss tends to rise every year as the tree becomes weaker each year after infection. Three fungicide applications can achieve 60–80% control of leaf spot.

=== Anthracnose ===
Anthracnose was not seen on California almonds until the early 1990s. By 1996 it was widespread and causing severe yield losses throughout the state. Typical losses in 1996 were 10–15% of the almond crop with severely affected crops incurring losses of 25%. Under wet conditions, orange spore masses are produced and appear as visible droplets. Lesions on mature fruit are rusty orange and gum profusely. Once the diseased fruit die they become mummies that remain on the tree. The pathogen overwinters in these mummies. 80–90% control can be achieved by applying fungicides to protect the crop before rains begin. The California Department of Pesticide Regulation has estimated that without the fungicides to control anthracnose the state's almond production would drop 15–30%.

=== Brown rot ===
Damage from brown rot occurs several years after the infection strikes. The primary symptom is fruiting spur loss. Brown rot was first discovered on California almonds in the late 19th century and currently affects most almond-producing areas of California. Brown rot can be controlled using fungicides through bloom in order to protect the flower parts from brown rot attacks. Experiments have demonstrated that 44% of twigs were infected with brown rot when crops were left untreated compared to only 4% when the crop was treated.

=== Crown and root rot ===
Crown and root rot of almonds is caused by at least 14 different Phytophthora species. The risk of root or crown infection is greatest during cool to moderate temperatures with prolonged or frequent soil saturation. A tree infected with Phytophthora can either undergo a period of slow decline that may last years or it can suddenly collapse and die in spring with the advent of warm weather. Eventually, leaves drop, terminal shoots die back, and death of the tree follows. Once in the root or crown the infection may extend into the crown, trunk, or branches. Currently, crown and root rot are a problem affecting 20% of California's almond orchards with potential yield losses of 50%.

=== Green fruit rot ===
Green fruit rot can be found throughout virtually all almond-producing regions of California. Green rot is typically controlled by fungicides applied to control other fungal diseases that occur during blooming. It is only when cooler temperatures and heavy moisture is present that almond growers are recommended to make fungicide applications specifically for the disease. When left untreated, green fruit rot can cause up to a 10% yield loss.

=== Leaf blight ===
Leaf blight of almonds was first discovered in 1950, and by 1983 it had spread throughout the Sacramento Valley. Almond leaf blight is characterized by the death of leaves throughout the summer. The fungus interferes with water conduction in the leaf. In fall and winter, dormant buds are killed by an extension of the lesion and in the spring, flowers are killed. Repeated attacks of leaf blight, though rarely killing more than 20% of the leaves, ultimately reduce tree vigor. Experiments have shown that the use of ziram and captan can reduce the incidence of leaf blight by 75–80% in treated trees.

=== Almond rust ===
Almond rust is a disease of almond trees that is characterized by angular yellow leaf spots on upper leaf surfaces and rusty brown masses of spores on lower leaf surfaces. It was first discovered in the upper Sacramento Valley area of California but now has subsequently spread throughout both the Sacramento and San Joaquin Valley orchards. It typically emerges in the summer and fall seasons and has been shown to cause rapid and extensive defoliation of trees. Treatments of maneb and sulfur in the early season months (typically spring and summer) have been shown to significantly reduce incidence and severity of rust outbreaks.

=== Scab ===
Almond scab was first documented in almond orchards in the 1950s. However it did not become a major disease until sprinkler irrigation became popular in the 1980s. By the early 1990s almond scab could be found throughout California almond orchards. Scab infects leaves, fruit, and twigs in almonds causing dark spots to form. Scab lesions look greasy and oily. The major concern with almond scab is partial or complete defoliation of the tree. As with leaf blight use of captan and ziram has been shown to reduce total incidence of almond scab infection.

=== Shot hole ===
Shot hole affects almonds by disrupting both the leaves and the fruit of the plant. It can result in premature nut ripening and plant defoliation. In some occasions, especially when rain persists in the springtime, complete defoliation and tree weakening can occur. Estimates have shown that approximately 80% of California's almond acres are infected with this fungus. A four-year research project by the Almond Board of California determined that production losses from shot hole could range from 50 to 75%. Captan in one to three applications has been used as the primary fungicide to combat this disease. It has been shown to reduce lesions per fruit by 96%.

== Apples ==
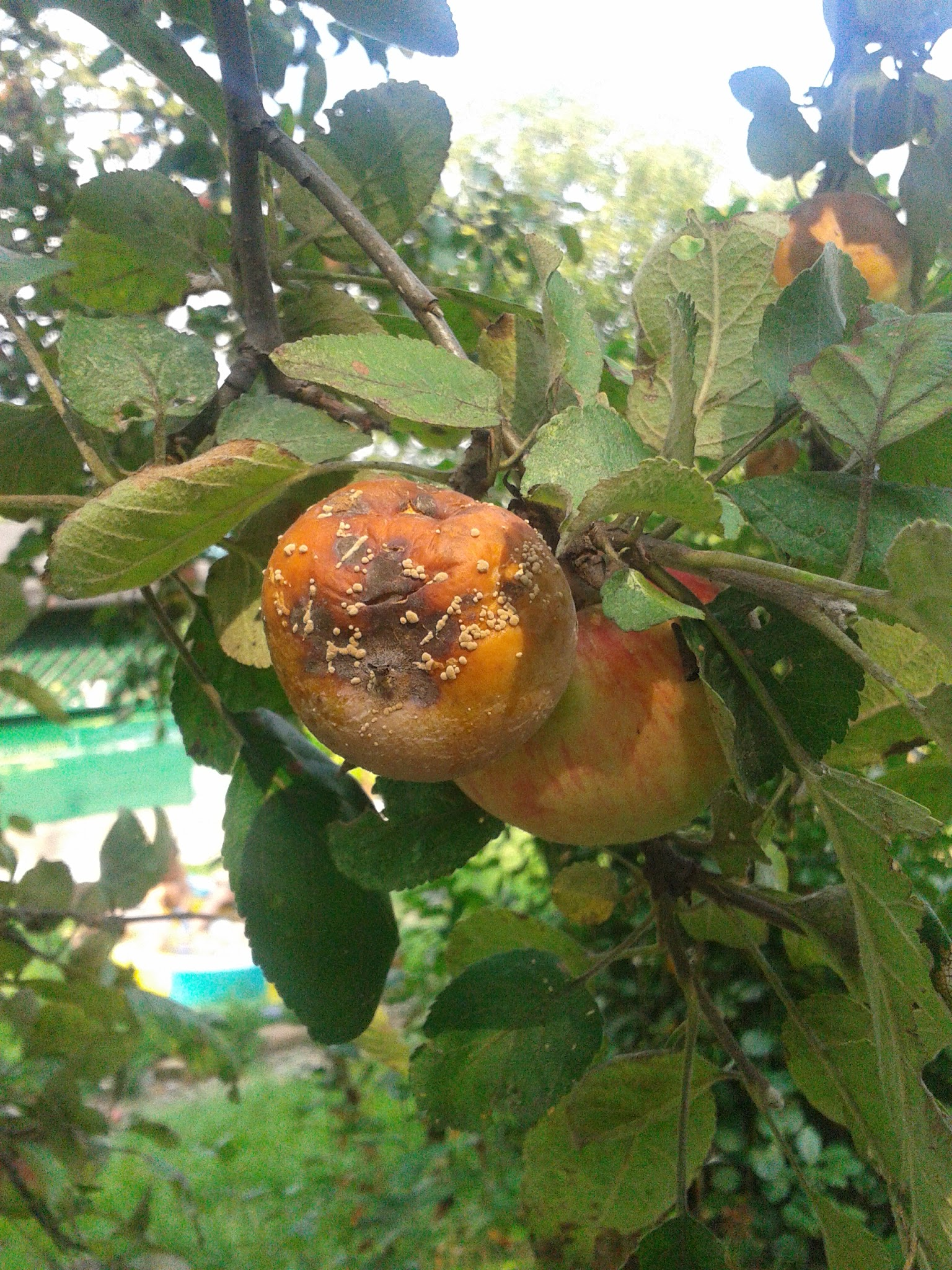
Brown Rot on Apple

Spraying for control of fungal diseases of apples started in the U.S. some time between 1880 and 1905.

=== Apple scab ===
Apple scab is caused by the fungus Venturia inaequalis. Mating among different strains of the fungus occurs shortly after leaf fall with spores developing in the fallen leaves during the winter. Spring rains cause spores to be forcibly discharged; they can be carried long distances by air currents to flowers, leaves, or young fruit. The spores then continue to develop and are released over a period of 5–9 weeks. These spores germinate and penetrate the outer layers of the plant, causing infection. The fungus grows beneath the cuticle and eventually ruptures to form dark green lesions. The number of lesions per leaf can be as few as 1–2 or there can be hundreds. The USDA's National Agricultural Pesticide Impact Assessment Program estimated that 100% of eastern apple orchards are stricken with apple scab and that without fungicide treatments yield losses would be as high as 90%. In the western orchards 52% are infected and apple yield loss can be as high as 22%. However, with the use of fungicides experiments have shown heavy reductions in the percentage of infected apples. One study was able to reduce the incidence from 77% to 2%.

=== Bitter rot ===
Bitter rot is a major disease in the Southeast U.S. in the summer months when the weather is hot and damp. The organism has a short incubation period and as a result epidemics of bitter rot can develop rapidly. The presence of the disease is first indicated by the very small light brown sunken spots beneath the apple skin. As the fungus grows and invades more of the apple tissue, the area becomes engorged until the entire apple is rotted. Around the start of the 20th century Bordeaux mixture was the primary technique for controlling the disease; in the 1940s growers shifted to synthetic chemical use. Without these fungicides is it estimated that apple yield loss due to bitter rot would be as high at 90%. The most effective fungicides for bitter rot control include the multisite mode-of-action fungicide captan, the osmotic signal transduction disrupter fludioxonil, the oxidative phosphorylation uncoupler fluazinam, the QOI inhibitors pyraclostrobin and trifloxystrobin, and the succinate dehydrogenase inhibitor (SDHI) benzovindiflupyr.

=== Black pox ===
This disease primarily affects the southeastern portion of the United States and is known to infect the cultivars Rome Beauty, Grimes Golden, Delicious, York Imperial, and Golden Delicious. Lesions on twigs are well defined, conical, shiny black swellings and on the fruit itself they are black, spherical, slightly sunken spots. Severely affected leaves may die within 2 to 3 weeks of infection. Infected branches will grow poorly, lose their leaves early, and die. Black pox can be controlled with the same fungicide sprays that are used to treat scab.

=== Blossom-end rot ===
The first symptom of blossom-end rot is soft, wet, and reddish discolorations that appear in the late summer months. As the rot stops growing it will begin to dry out and appear sunken. The affected fruit will often drop prematurely. Fungicide experiments have shown reduced incidence, from 5% to less than 0.5%, with treatment.

=== Brooks fruit spot ===
Brooks fruit spot is a minor disease of the apple and is found mostly throughout the Northeast and Mid-Atlantic regions. As the fruit first emerges the disease appears as dark green lesions on the fruit of the apple. As the apple begins to emerge these blemishes grow and change to purple or green. Brooks fruit spot is usually controlled with fungicides applied during the early cover-spray period. One study showed that apple orchards that were not treated with fungicides had 87% of their fruit infected with brooks fruit spot while only 1–6% of trees that were treated with fungicides showed symptoms of the disease.

=== Fire blight ===
Fire blight was first described in New York in the late 18th century, and moved west with settlers, becoming established throughout North American apple production areas by the early 20th century. While fire blight has always been a concern in eastern apple production, severe outbreaks in the west in recent years have caused growers there to adopt more consistent and vigorous monitoring and management programs as well. The disease can affect every part of the tree, from the fruit to the trunk. Infected trees may die within months or can linger for years with severely reduced yields. In addition to the scorched appearance of the plant parts that gives the disease its name, plant tissues infected with the bacteria will exude milky or reddish-brown ooze. Initially copper sprays were used for fire blight control in the 1930s but this method had limited success. In the 1950s streptomycin and oxytetracycline showed high success in controlling fire blight in comparison to copper. Since then streptomycin sprayed two to three times during blooming phase has become the treatment of choice.

=== Powdery mildew ===
Powdery mildew is a common fungal infection of apples and can occur in almost any apple growing climate. The spores from fungi preserved over the winter are released from the unfolding leaves of the buds. The spores, carried by the wind, infect leaves, blossoms, and fruit. The fungus spreads until it covers the whole leaf and then grows down twigs, covering them with a gray felt. This results in aborted blossoms, reduced finish quality, and reduced yield. The USDA has estimated that 40% of apple orchards in the East and 50% of apple orchards in the West are infected with powdery mildew. Without control of the fungus yields would drop by 65%.

=== Quince rust ===
Quince rust infects the fruit of the apple trees but does not affect the leaves. Quince rust spores infect cedar trees and create cylindrical galls from which emerge spore horns the following spring. These galls may produce spores for up to twenty years. Quince rust is economically important primarily when an extended wetting period with a mean temperature above 10 °C (50 °F) occurs between the tight cluster and late pink bud stages. Under these conditions, economic losses may occur throughout large geographic areas. Experiments with fungicide sprays have been shown to provide complete control of rust.

=== White rot ===
White rot gets its name from the soft, watery, and light-colored rotted fruit that is left over after an apple is infected. The fungus survives from season to season in the dead bark and mummified fruit of the apple tree. Spores can survive in the dead bark for up to six years. Growers are advised to treat for white rot once the sugar content of the fruit reaches approximately 10%. USDA estimates that 20% of apple orchards in eastern states are infected with the fungus and that without fungicide use yield losses would be 65%.

== Artichokes ==
California produces 100% of all artichoke crops in the U.S. 84% of this acreage is located near the cool, moist, coastal area of Monterey Bay. The climate there is ideal for artichoke production.

=== Powdery Mildew ===
In 1984, artichoke fields were reported to have been infected with powdery mildew for the first time. In the ensuing years the disease continued to reappear with each year the disease becoming more widespread than in the past. The fungus colonizes the underside of leaves and the wind carries spores between fields. Severely infected leaves will discolor, collapse, and dry up prematurely; thus reducing the plant’s photosynthetic area.

Currently, there are no registered fungicides that provide effective control of the disease in the coastal conditions of California. Sulfur is registered but it has been shown to be largely ineffective in controlling powdery mildew. For sulfur to be effective, it is critical that the ambient air temperature be warm. The cool and humid climate of the coastal region means sulfur is ineffective in controlling powdery mildew. As a result, every year since 1987 California has requested the EPA grant emergency registration for fungicides to be used in controlling powdery mildew.

== Asparagus ==
=== Crown rot ===
Crown rot in asparagus was first reported in California in 1938 when Californian growers began to report a slimy, orange-yellow asparagus tissue with soft lesions causing post harvest losses of 20–30%. As lesions grow they eventually collapse and shrivel. In the 1980s it was shown that fungicidal treatments of metalaxyl increased yields by 80%. Today mefenoxam (metalaxyl-m) is the primary fungicide used to treat crown rot.

=== Purple spot ===
Purple spot was first observed in the United States in the 1980s. Yield loss due to this disease is delayed because the damage to fern growth does not affect current yields but instead affects the future crop. Damage results in the defoliation of needles, reducing the flow of carbohydrates to the roots and subsequently lowering the next year's yield by up to 52%. In the spring spores produced from the previous year's infected crops are spread by water and wind to new host plants.

The primary control of purple spot was EBDC fungicides (ethylenebisdithiocarbamates) until processors began to reject the use of EBDCs. As a result, since 1990 exemptions for chlorothalonil and tebuconazole in Michigan have been granted by the EPA for use on asparagus. The fungicides are applied at the end of the harvest and chlorothalonil has been shown in experiments to reduce purple spot by 99% and increase yields by 36%. This increase in yield as a result of purple spot control has been shown to translate into a net return of $200–400 per acre for asparagus growers .

=== Asparagus rust ===
Asparagus rust was first reported in the U.S. in 1896. It began on the asparagus crops of mostly northeastern states and began to move westward across the country- For each successive year the disease was discovered in new western areas until in 1902 it was reported in California for the first time. Research to control the disease began with Bordeaux mixture experiments around the start of the 20th century. Copper and sulfur dust were tried as well but their success was very limited. Sulfur was the only one to have much success at all. Rust resistant strains of asparagus were cultivated but by the 1940s and 1950s these strains of asparagus were no longer providing adequate levels of resistance. In the 1950s zineb and mancozeb were developed as the primary means to control rust. Zineb reduced infection by 85% and mancozeb by 97% . By 1989 EBDC fungicides had become the most common fungicidal means to control rust on asparagus. However, after the EPA almost cancelled the use of EBDCs on asparagus many processors decided they would not accept EBDC-treated asparagus despite the EPA allowing its use after review. This meant that many growers were left with no registered fungicide to use on asparagus. Since 1990 the EPA has granted exemptions for tebuconazole, myclobutanil, and triadimefon for use on asparagus.

== Bananas ==
Hawaii is the primary state in the U.S. where bananas are grown. The average yield is 15,000 pounds/acre. Approximately 600-800 plants are grown per acre. Planting occurs year-round. Banana bunches are ready for harvest 12 to 15 months after initial planting. On a banana plantation, plants can be seen at all stages of vegetative growth and fruit maturity year-round. Bananas can be harvested any day of the year.

=== Black sigatoka ===
Like yellow sigatoka, black sigatoka, was first documented in the Sigatoka valley of Fiji. It was first recorded in 1964 and being more virulent tended to displace yellow sigatoka in banana crops. Therefore, yellow sigatoka is rarely found in locations where black sigatoka occurs. Black sigatoka infection appears on the leaves of crops during the unfurling. Sigatoka spores will incubate on the leaves for up to six days before penetrating the leaf. After this the infection will continue to colonize for a week before the plant exhibits symptoms. The initial symptoms are small spots on the undersides of the leaves. These appear 10–15 days after infection and grow until they appear as black streaks on the leaves. This is what gives black sigatoka its alternate name of black leaf streak. These streaks can dry out and collapse in less than a day. This affects growth and yield of bananas by reducing the total photosynthetic area of the leaf. However the largest effect on yields is through the toxins produced by black sigatoka that causes a premature ripening of the bananas. These prematurely ripened fruit cannot be sold and must be discarded.

Under normal conditions in Hawaii it is estimated that without control of black sigatoka yield losses would be 30%. Sigatoka is controlled with a combination of protectant and systemic fungicides in order to prevent resistance from developing. Mancozeb is applied as the primary protectant and fenbuconazole, tebuconazole, and azoxystrobin are applied as systemic fungicides. These fungicides are applied during summer.

=== Yellow sigatoka ===
Yellow sigatoka derives its name from the Sigatoka valley in Fiji. This was where the disease was first documented in 1912. Over the course of the first half of the 20th century the disease spread to all major banana-producing countries of the world. It was first seen in Trinidad in 1934 and quickly spread to the mainland and up through Central America . The disease can spread spores over 1,000 miles with wind currents. By 1936 experiments with Bordeaux mixture were developed to control the disease. The disease was first discovered in Hawaii in 1958.

== Barley ==
The major barley producing states of the United States are Idaho, Minnesota, Montana, and North Dakota. These states make up 70% of barley production in America. This barley is principally used in malting and brewing. It is also in some areas used as a feed grain.

=== Barley scab ===
Outbreaks of barley scab (also known as fusarium head blight) usually occur when there are high moisture conditions during the flowering stages of barley development. The infected crops become bleached in color, shrunken, and discolored and will grow pink spore masses on the barley heads. The disease has the potential to destroy a crop within weeks. The shrunken kernels can become so light that the wind can blow them away from the rest of the crop. In addition, barley scab produces toxins that severely reduce the value of the harvested barley. This toxin, deoxynivalenol, also known as vomitoxin because of its tendency to induce vomiting at high levels, will pass through the brewing process into the beer. When the beer is opened the toxin will cause the liquid to overflow from the bottle or can. Because this is not commercially desirable, barley producers receive severe price discounts when vomitoxin is present.

Currently control of barley scab is seen as a high priority, resulting in the U.S. National Wheat and Barley Scab Initiative. In 2005 alone North Dakota State experts estimated that scab cost the North Dakota farm economy $162 million and in 1993 it cost North Dakota, South Dakota, and Minnesota $1 billion. Fungicide trials in 2004 were promising. Results demonstrated that fungicide use reduced scab by 77–85%, reduced vomitoxin levels by 49–69%, and increased yields by 10–14%.

=== Stripe rust ===
Stripe rust is a recent fungus to arrive in North and South America. The disease was first observed in Colombia in 1975 and is believed to have been brought over from Europe. In the U.S. it was first discovered in Texas in 1991 and by the mid-90s it could be found throughout barley crops in the western states. Stripe rust is now established in California, Idaho, Oregon, and Washington and all other barley areas of the Pacific Northwest are considered highly susceptible. Between 1996 and 1998 in Oregon yield losses of 25–50% were reported and in California between 15 and 30% were recorded. The state of Idaho estimates that without fungicide use yield losses would be 40%, as opposed to 5% with fungicide application.

== Blueberries ==
Blueberries are susceptible to a number of fungal diseases. These have been shown by the USDA to reduce yields by 25–60% if left uncontrolled.

=== Alternaria leaf spot ===
Leaf spot was first identified in North Carolina in the early 1970s when it was found to be causing widespread fruit decay in blueberries. The disease is especially harmful to growers because symptoms of the disease do not develop until May, about a month before the June harvest. When the fruit ripens it becomes covered in a greenish fungal growth and can become leaky. Because the fungus develops late in the harvest, it can be effectively controlled by applying fungicides at early bloom and then every two weeks until harvest.

=== Botrytis blight ===
Botrytis blight is a grey mold fungus that was first observed on New Jersey blueberries in 1924 and by the 1950s was considered the most dangerous disease of the Northwest. USDA estimates that 95% of Northwestern blueberry crop and 40% of eastern blueberry fields are infected with botrytis blight. Yield losses within these fields with uncontrolled blight are estimated to be 30–40%. In most cases infections in the blossoms of the plant results in ovary mortality which prevents development of the blueberry itself.

=== Fusicoccum canker ===
Fusicoccum canker is a disease of the blueberry that is mostly limited to Michigan blueberry producers. It was first discovered in the 1960s and has been an annual problem of the lower portion of the peninsula. When left uncontrolled the disease has been shown to reduce yields by 30%. Fusicoccum canker is primarily controlled using captan. Research has shown that regular applications can reduce infectious cankers by 82–95%.

=== Mummy berry ===
This fungal infection strikes the blueberry plant in the early spring. Over the winter the mummy berry infection incubates in the mummified blueberry fruit that has fallen on the ground and in the spring cup-shaped structures of the fungus begin to grow. These structures will then eject spores for nine days at an average of sixty thousand spores per day. These spores are carried by the wind to the twigs and flowers of developing blueberry plants. The fungus then infects the young leaves and flowers. This is infection stage 1. The secondary infection stage occurs when the infected leaves and flower grow conidia, these conidia release spores which will actually "fertilize" healthy blueberry flowers causing the plant to grow a thick fungus sclerotium that helps the fungus to survive the winter. These berries then fall to the ground where they serve as the hosts for the next year's mummberry infection. If the infection were left uncontrolled the USDA estimates that blueberry yields would fall an average of 20 to 50%. without control, the state of Maine estimated their yields would drop 25% and Michigan has reported that they would lose 25–57% of the crop. Experiments with fungicide applications have reduced the incidence of mummy berry at harvest from 21–24% to 0.4% and increased yield by up to 34%.

=== Phytophthora root rot ===
Phytophthora root rot was first reported in the blueberry plant in 1963. In plants surveyed in North Carolina it was found that 40% of plants were infected. Symptoms of root rot include yellowing or reddening of leaves, heavy defoliation, and stunted plant growth. Today current USDA estimates are that 80% of eastern blueberry acres are infected with root rot and it has the potential to reduce yields by up to 25%.

=== Pseudomonas blight ===
Pseudomonas blight is a bacterial disease that invades the blueberry plant early in the season when tissue is damaged by freezing temperatures. The bacteria invade the tissue of the plant and spread throughout the plant as long as it remains cool and damp. As the infection spreads thin strands of ooze appear on the surface of the tissue. When temperatures rise the disease will retreat until fall when the colder weather allows it to return. Copper is primarily used to control the bacteria population.

=== Ripe rot ===
Ripe rot, the more common name for anthracnose, is a disease localized mostly to the northern and southern blueberry-growing regions. However has been spreading east and it is now estimated to infect 30% of the eastern blueberry growing regions. Much like leaf spot, ripe rot symptoms appear as the blueberry begins to ripen and mature. Once the blueberry has ripened, it softens and orange spores will be exuded. This disease can be especially costly because if a diseased berry showing no symptoms is put in a container of untainted berries it can very quickly infect the entire container. Control of this disease is achieved with fungicidal applications every 1–2 weeks.

=== Septoria leaf spot ===
Septoria leaf spot infects the blueberry plant through spores ejected from infected leaves and stem lesions left on the ground from the previous harvest season. These spores infect the crop and small white/tan leaf lesions form on the plant and the stem in early May. These lesions continue to develop and multiply through September. Severe infection causes defoliation of the plant. This will lower fruit yield as the nutrient supply is reduced. In weaker infections where defoliation does not occur the loss of photosynthetic area will reduce yields as well. Use of fenbuconazole has been shown to be successful in controlling leaf spot. If applied at harvest it will help prevent leaf spot from forming the next year. It has been shown to average 45% greater yields in the next harvest.

== Cabbage ==
=== Alternaria leaf spot ===
Alternaria leaf spot affects the cabbage plant by causing severe spotting and discoloration to the head of the plant. It is only a superficial effect to the plant but because of the black color of the leaf spots the marketability of a severely infected cabbage crop is low. Without control leaf spot is estimated to be able to reduce yields by up to 50%. Alternaria leaf spot is controlled using the same treatment as downy mildew: applications of azoxystrobin, copper, chlorothalonil, mancozeb, and maneb beginning midseason.

=== Black rot ===
Due to its ability to spread rapidly and destroy entire fields of crops black rot can be considered the most serious disease of the cabbage plant. Under the right conditions one plant has the ability to spread the disease to an entire field and cause 100% yield loss. The disease thrives in areas with heavy rainfall and warmer temperatures. The bacteria invade the plant through the water the plant absorbs and once inside spreads rapidly. It obtains its name because it will blacken and clog the veins of the plant making it impossible to keep nutrients moving through the plant. Copper is the primary treatment for black rot control.

=== Clubroot ===
Clubroot gets its name from its primary symptom: enlargement of the plant roots. The abnormally large roots are unable to properly absorb water and nutrients from the ground and the result is cabbages that are undersized, wilted, and discolored. If left uncontrolled yield losses due to clubroot can be as high as 50%. The only fungicide shown to be effective in treating clubroot is PCNB.

=== Downy mildew ===
Downy mildew left uncontrolled has the ability to reduce yields by up to 55% and infest up to 80% of plants. Downy mildew is primarily controlled through the use of several fungicides applied during midseason. The fungicides used include azoxystrobin, copper, chlorothalonil, mancozeb, and maneb. Farmers in Florida who regularly use fungicides have been shown to reduce yield losses due to downy mildew to as low as 2%.

== Carrots ==
=== Bacterial blight ===
Uncontrolled bacterial blight has been shown to cause yield losses up to 20%. Symptoms include small, dry, and brittle yellowish-brown spots on the plant and stalks covered in bacterial ooze. The primary treatment of bacterial blight is applications of copper before the crop is fully mature.

=== Cavity spot ===
Cavity spot differs from the other diseases of the carrot in that symptoms are only visible on the roots of the plant and therefore it is impossible to tell if a plant is infected from above ground. The primary symptom of cavity spot is small half-inch lesions on the roots of the plant. This disease is treated with metalaxyl which allows for almost complete control of the disease. Without metalaxyl studies have found 50–60% of the carrot crop will be infected; after metalaxyl application, incidence is under 1%.

=== Powdery mildew ===
Powdery mildew is one of the more recent diseases of carrots. It was first discovered in 1975 in the United States in the warmer climates of California and Texas. Powdery mildew will cover the carrot with a film of white fungal growth which does not kill the plant, but stunts the growth of the carrot. These weaker plants are nearly impossible to harvest mechanically.

== Collards ==
There are three major disease of collards: Alternaria, downy mildew, and black rot. Alternaria symptoms are small brown lesions on the surface of the collard leaf. Downy mildew produces small yellow fungal spots on the leaf that cause the plant to wither and die. Finally, black rot gets its name because its primary symptom is the bacteria will infect the veins of the plant and turn them black. Additionally, often a V-shaped lesion coming in from the outside of the leaf is characteristic for black rot. These black veins eventually collapse and the plant dies. All three of these diseases are controlled with copper sprays.

== Cotton ==
=== Pythium and Rhizoctonia ===
Pythium and Rhizoctonia are both seedling diseases of the cotton plant. They can be devastating to cotton plants because they develop when seedlings are unable to overcome the damage being caused by the invading fungus. The diseases often kill seeds before they grow. However, if the seeds do manage to sprout they demonstrate symptoms almost immediately. The stalks of the cotton plant will be weak, brown sunken lesions will appear on the stem, and the plant will often die before producing or will have very poor yields. Growers who plant early are especially susceptible because cooler temperatures and damper weather are conducive to these diseases. Therefore, growers who plant early are advised to use in-furrow fungicides for control: PNCB and iprodione for Rhizoctonia and etridiazole and mefenoxam for pythium. Recently, azoxystrobin has proven effective in controlling both rhizoctonia and pythium.

=== Cotton rust ===
Cotton rust primarily attacks plants in Arizona, New Mexico, and Texas. The disease attacks during the summer months and causes yellow or orange spots to grow on the leaves of the cotton plant. These spots can cause defoliation, premature openings, broken stems, and reduced yield. Crops with severe outbreaks have been known to incur losses of up to 50%. This disease is controlled with applications of mancozeb.

== Garlic ==
=== Garlic rust ===
Early symptoms of garlic rust are small yellow spots on the leaves that soon expand until the leaf tissue shatters and visible pustules emerge. Diseased bulbs lose their protective dry outer skin, preventing photosynthesis and leaving the garlic prone to shattering when mechanically harvested. In trials tebuconazole and azoxystrobin have been shown to provide 50% higher yields in treated crops.

== Grapes ==
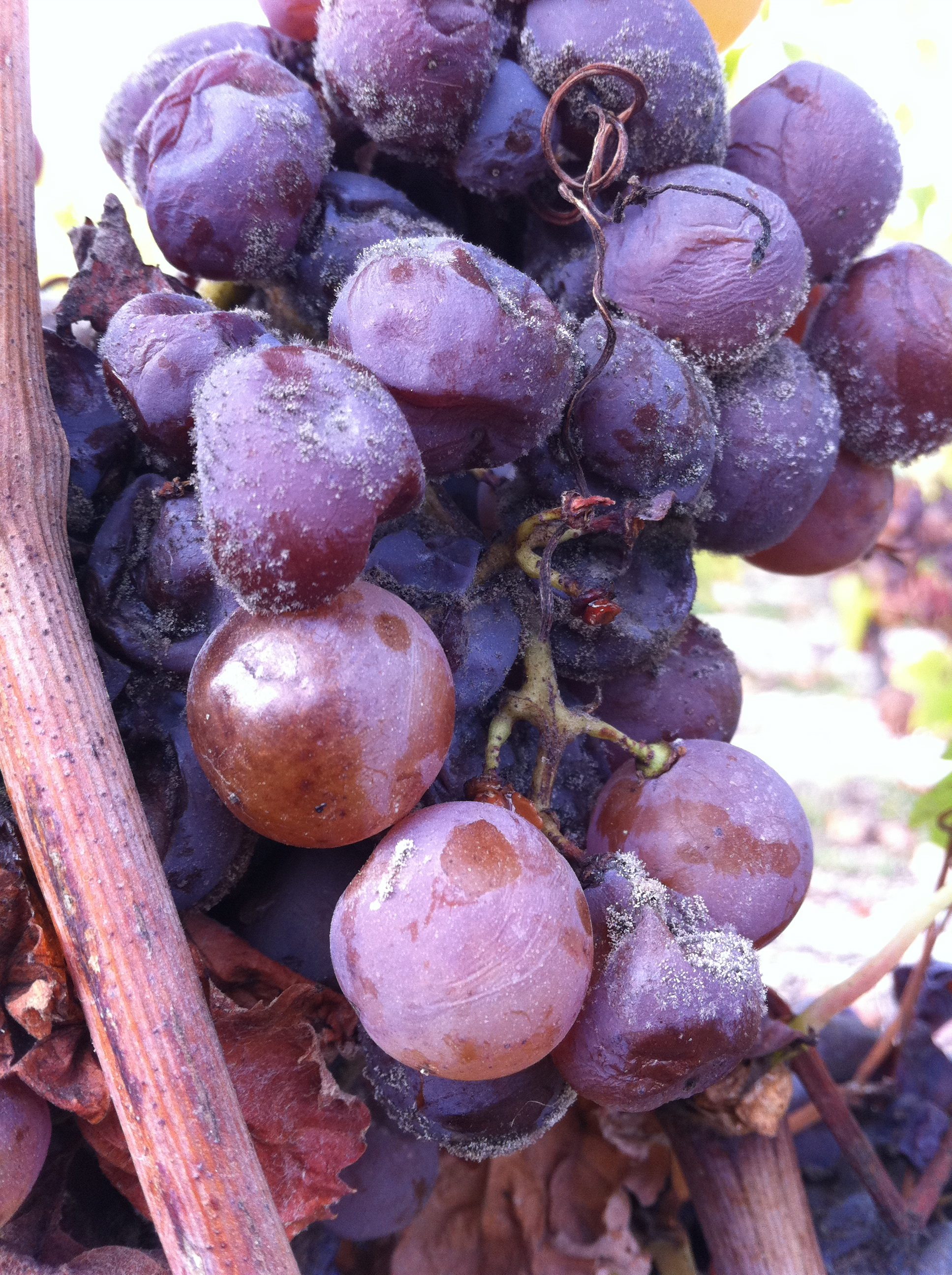
Noble rot on grapes

=== Black rot ===
Black rot is a disease estimated to affect 95% of all eastern grape vineyards. The USDA estimates it could reduce yields by 85% if left untreated. Black rot is spread through spores left in the mummied grapes infected the year before. Upon infection the grapes shrivel up and turn black. These grapes do not fall from the vine but stay attached, and over winter spores grow within the infected grape. When summer comes the rain re-moistens the dried grape and causes it to swell. Spores discharge from the swollen grape into the air and infect the healthy crop. Prior to fungicide development for black rot, in conditions favorable to the disease losses of 70 to 100 percent of the crop were common. Today however applications of fungicides have been able to give almost complete control of the disease. In many vineyards infections can be reduced from 95% down to 1%.

=== Botrytis bunch rot ===
Cold and wet climates favor this disease, which is why it is often found in the coastal vineyards of California and New York. In the eastern vineyards this disease is estimated to infect 30% of grapes while in California it can infect up to half. This can reduce yields by 40–60%. Much like black rot, bunch rot overwinters in the berries and infects the next season's crop through spore ejections in the summer. Originally Bordeaux mixture was used to controlled botrytis bunch rot but the use of synthetic chemicals is now the preferred method.

=== Phomopsis cane and leaf spot ===
Cane and leaf spot is a disease found on large areas of the East coast but rarely in California. The USDA estimates it affects 75% of the acres of eastern vineyards, with the potential to reduce yields up to 15%. The disease can result in lesions, defoliation, and berry rot. However the same fungicide sprays used to control black rot done early in the season have been shown to control cane and leaf spot.

=== Powdery mildew ===
Powdery mildew was first reported in European grape vineyards in the mid-1850s. It could reduce yields by up to 80%. In France alone it reduced wine production from a billion gallons to only two hundred million gallons. It was as a result of this disease's rapid spread throughout the continent that the first fungicide, sulfur, was discovered. The success of sulfur was so great that the grape industry was sparked in California when it was seen that disease could now be controlled and grapes were easy to grow. Uncontrolled powdery mildew rots the grapes from the inside out. Powdery mildew slows the growth of the grape skin so that the inside pulp grows at a faster rate and bursts through. These split grapes dry up and rot. The grapes that do not split open are of much lower quality than normal grapes. Their acidity is much higher and as a result the wines taste bitter and off to most wine drinkers. In order to control powdery mildew the same treatment that was recommended in the late 19th century is still used today: regular applications of sulfur every 1–2 weeks.

== Green beans ==
=== Alternaria ===
Alternaria was first reported on green beans in Florida in 1951 after a hundred acres were lost to the disease in one season. By the 1970s it had spread up the coast to New York. The disease causes lesions on the skin of the green bean, killing the tissue and giving the plant a moldy appearance. Trials have shown that applications of chlorothalonil can reduce alternaria by up to 85%.

=== Bacterial blight ===
Bacterial blight is endemic to green bean crops grown east of the Rocky Mountains. During ideal conditions (usually humid weather) the disease can inflict losses as high as 60%. Symptoms include lesions resembling burn marks that gradually grow larger. In some states incidence of the disease can be as high as 100%. Trials have shown that properly timed copper sprays can reduce incidence by 90%.

=== Root rot ===
Root rot is a common disease of Florida green beans and can reduce crop yields there by up to 75% if untreated. It was not until the 1950s that an effective fungicide was found to control root rot. Trials in Florida in the 1950s showed that applications of PCNB were able to reduce incidence to 3%. PCNB is still the primary treatment today.

=== Powdery mildew ===
Powdery mildew appears on the green bean plant as a powdery white mold on the surface of the green bean leaf. This can grow and cover the entire plant. Yield losses occur because the damage makes the crop not commercially viable. Powdery mildew can be controlled with applications of sulfur. The original trials in the 1930s showed that incidence could be reduced from 87% to 2%.

=== Bean rust ===
Bean rust is a disease of the green bean that causes rust-colored pustules on the leaves. These pustules eventually rupture and eject thousands of spores into the air to be carried to other plants. Each individual spore can produce a fresh pustule on a plant within a week; therefore untreated rust can rapidly reach epidemic levels. When leaves become infected with rust they rapidly die causing defoliation. Research in the 1930s showed that sulfur was an effective treatment for rust and since then yield losses in treated fields have been reduced by 60%.

=== White mold ===
Before effective fungicides were developed white mold caused significant hardship for green bean growers. White mold is considered a resilient disease. After infecting the plant white mold produces black structures called sclerotia that fall to the soil and can survive for over five years until the conditions are right for infection again. Since white mold affects plants very late in the growing season farmers would often harvest early to avoid losing much of their crop. However this usually resulted in a 30% loss of crop. Research in the 1970s eventually discovered that fungicides applied every 20 days reduced white mold incidence to 0% in treated areas.

== Hazelnuts ==
=== Eastern filbert blight ===
Eastern filbert blight is caused by the fungus Anisogramma anomala and is indigenous to the Northeast United States. The fungus causes a small canker on the Native American Hazelnut, Corylus americana. However, on the introduced and commercially important European Hazelnut, Corylus avellana, it causes a lethal disease. The cankers caused by EFB slowly expand and kill the tree over the course of several years if diseased tree limbs are not removed in time. Research with chlorothalonil and tebuconazole in the 1990s showed that 4–5 applications of the fungicides on a two-week schedule when vegetative buds are breaking dormancy is ideal for control of EFB. The state of Oregon has estimated that if left uncontrolled EFB could eliminate half of the state's hazelnuts within ten years.

== Hot peppers ==
New Mexico accounts for roughly 65% of all U.S. hot pepper production.

=== Bacterial spot ===
Bacterial spot is spread from plant to plant through water, wind, and plant contact. Once infected, the leaves of the plant are targeted by the disease. The disease causes severe spotting of the pepper and kills the leaves. This is a twofold problem because the defoliation results in the pepper being discolored by sunscald. Research for bacterial spot treatment has shown that copper sprays have been able to increase marketable yields by 50% in treated fields.

=== Powdery mildew ===
Powdery mildew causes a white powdery growth to cover the leaves of the hot pepper plant. These leaves may drop prematurely and as with bacterial spot can then cause sunscald. This disease has been known to cause yield losses as high as 50–60% in untreated fields. The prime fungicide used to control powdery mildew is myclobutanil.

== Lettuce ==
=== Bottom rot ===
Bottom rot symptoms consist largely of deep reddish-colored lesions on the leaves that slowly spread from leaf to leaf until the entire head is rotted. Trials with vinclozolin have demonstrated effectiveness in controlling bottom rot. Research indicated that when treated, crop yields rise about 36%.

=== Downy mildew ===
Downy mildew is an extremely common disease of the lettuce plant. This is largely due to the disease's quick germination period—three hours—and the lettuce plant being susceptible at all growth stages. One study estimated that in untreated Florida fields 75% of lettuce was infected with downy mildew and considered unsalable. Research with maneb has shown the ability to reduce the number of lesions per 10 plants from 187 to about one. EBDC and fosetyl-Al have also been shown effective in Florida trials that reduced unmarketable heads to 2%.

=== Lettuce drop ===
Lettuce drop is another resilient disease of the lettuce plant. It can be found in all lettuce-growing regions of the U.S. and is able to survive in the soil for up to a decade after infecting a field. The fungus appears on the plant as a white mass on the leaf that slowly turns into a hard black growth. These growths release spores that infect the lettuce plant with pathogens that slowly move up the stalk, killing tissue as they travel. Use of DCNA, iprodione, and vinclozolin about a month before harvest has been shown to significantly reduce lettuce drop in treated fields. In treated California fields fungicides are able to reduce yield losses as low as 5%.

=== Powdery mildew ===
Powdery mildew attacks lettuce plants by robbing them of the nutrients within the leaf. The fungus appears as a white growth on the upper surface of the leaf where it uses small tubes to pull nutrients out of the plant. This causes severe discoloration and eventual defoliation of the plant. Applications of sulfur are recommended as the primary way to control powdery mildew on lettuce.

== Onions ==
=== Downy mildew ===
Downy mildew is an extremely fast-developing disease in the onion. Studies have observed up to 40% of a field being infected in less than three days. The first symptoms of the disease are white and purple growths on the surface of the plant leaves. Eventually these leaves die. This in turn destroys the plant's photosynthetic abilities, stunting growth and sometimes killing the plant. Untreated downy mildew can reduce yields by 65%. Downy mildew is controlled with the same foliar fungicides as leaf blight: azoxystrobin, copper, mancozeb, maneb, and mefenoxam.

=== Botrytis leaf blight ===
Leaf blight occurs in areas with hot and humid weather. The spores land on onion leaves, penetrate the skin, and rapidly kill the leaf. This causes a severe reduction in bulb size, as high as 50%, and can happen in less than a week. Applications of foliar fungicides can be used to control leaf blight. These include azoxystrobin, chlorothalonil copper, mancozeb, maneb, and mefenoxam.

=== Purple blotch ===
Symptoms of purple blotch are primarily small white lesions that grow larger as they turn purple and brown. From these lesions spores are produced that cause additional lesions and also spread to other plants. However to develop, the disease requires very wet conditions for an extended period of time. Fungicide-treated fields have been found to have yields roughly 20–35% higher than untreated fields.

=== Seed rot ===
Yield loss due to seed rot can be as high as 30% in heavily infected acres. The disease infects the onion seed and will cause the onions roots to be gray and mushy. These roots and plants rapidly decay and decompose, killing the plant. Mefenoxam is recommended as treatment for seed rot.

=== Smut ===
Smut is a tough disease of the onion because it can last for years in the soil as spores. When the onion crop is planted the spores germinate and enter the fresh seeds. When the plant grows lesions form on the leaf and any bulbs that form will be covered in black spots. Most of the time infected seeds will die within 3–5 weeks of planting. Mancozeb is recommended for treatment of smut.

== Peanuts ==
=== Cylindrocladium black rot ===
This disease infects any part of the plant below ground, so it often targets the roots; pegs or pods that are below ground are also vulnerable. Infected parts turn black and die. Often the infection spreads and kills the entire root system, effectively killing the plant. Originally the disease was localized to North Carolina and Virginia, but recently Florida and Georgia have begun experiencing higher incidences of the rot. Recent research has shown tebuconazole to significantly suppress the disease and increase yields by up to 1,500 pounds per acre.

=== Leaf Spot, Early ===
(Cercospora arachidicola)

Spots first appear on the upper surface of lower leaves as faint brown to black pinpoint dots. As the dots enlarge to become brown to dark-brown circular spots, a yellow "halo" generally develops as a border around each spot. This disease is frequently seen as early as June 1 in both North Carolina and Virginia. Spots with an irregular shape can also develop on leaf petioles and plant stems. Defoliation and reduced yield at harvest can result if this disease is not controlled by fungicide sprays. Leaves that fall to the soil surface may trigger epidemics of certain soilborne diseases such as Southern stem rot.

=== Leaf Spot, Late ===
Cercosporidium personatum

Like early leafspot, this disease can also cause defoliation, reduced yield, and increased incidence of certain soilborne diseases such as Southern stem rot. As the name implies, late leafspot is most prevalent during the later part of the growing season. Spots are generally darker in color than early leafspot and commonly show no yellow halo.

=== Peanut rust ===
Peanut rust is unique because it is not a native disease to the U.S. and has not been able to survive beyond a single season when introduced. Airborne spores are annually introduced from other peanut-producing nations. Rust causes reduced peanut pod fill and can potentially defoliate the entire crop if the conditions are right. Originally copper and sulfur were used to control rust, but they were only partially effective. It was not until the development of chlorothalonil and tebuconazole that an effective treatment for peanut rust was found.

=== Sclerotinia blight ===
Scletotinia blight was first discovered in Virginia in the early 1970s but soon spread to the peanut producing states of North Carolina, Oklahoma and Texas. By 1982 it was considered to be one of the more significant diseases of the peanut. In the late 1990s it was estimated that 70% of Virginia peanut land was infected with sclertotinia blight. The disease attacks the plant by producing a white mold on the stems that slowly consumes the stem, causing pods to detach early and leaving them undersized. Pod loss can be as high as 50% in infected areas. In Virginia a five-year experiment saw yield increase of 35% in fields treated with fluazinam.

=== Stem rot ===
Stem rot, also known as white mold or southern blight, can be found in just about any peanut producing area in the U.S. The most notable symptom of this disease is the white cottony fungal growth that envelops the entire plant. This mold will appear midseason when the foliage has covered the row middles. This damages the pods and creates a rotted texture. In the 1950s PCNB was found to be somewhat effective at preventing white mold; however it was only able to reduce incidence by 15%. It was not until the 1990s when tebuconazole was introduced that a fungicide was able to provide effective disease control. Tebuconazole is able to reduce incidence of white mold by 80–90%.

=== Web blotch ===
Web blotch is currently found in all major peanut growing states in the south. It can be a highly damaging disease. In ideal conditions web blotch can cause yield loss as high as 50%. The first sign that a plant is infected with web blotch is small tan blotches on plant leaves. The leaf will become brittle and the plant will defoliate. Chlorothalonil and tebuconazole are effective treatments for reducing web blotch incidence.

== Pecans ==
=== Pecan scab ===
Pecan scab is the deadliest disease of the pecan. In the right conditions—high humidity and dampness—up to 100% crop reduction can occur if left uncontrolled. As a result, fungicides are used on 85–90% of all pecan acreage in southeastern states annually. Fenbuconazole, propiconazole, and TPTH are the primary fungicides used in the southeast for scab control. In the southwest however fungicides are rarely used because the dry growing conditions are not conducive to growth of pecan scab.

== Pistachios ==
=== Panicle and shoot blight ===
In California, since its discovery, panicle and shoot blight have become major diseases of the pistachio crop. The warm, wet weather in the California pistachio acreage has proven to be optimal for the disease. In 1998 alone total lost production was estimated to be around 20 million pounds. The only areas that have been found resilient to the disease are Kern County and parts of the San Joaquin Valley. Symptoms include dark lesions and shoots from the buds that are stunted and black. Eventually the leaves on the shoots wither and die and the fruit clusters subsequently collapse. Currently azoxystrobin and chlorothalonil are used for blight control.

== Raspberries ==
=== Botrytis fruit rot ===
This disease infects plants from berries left mummified from last year's crop. When the flowers open, spores from these mummified berries are expelled and infect the plant. This disease can be very costly because no symptoms are exhibited by the plant until harvest time, and then symptoms appear very rapidly. The infected berries quickly develop a layer of gray mold (gray mold is also an alternate name for botrytis fruit rot), begin to leak fluid, and release more spores to cause additional infections. Since the disease is such a late and rapidly occurring disease preventative fungicidal sprays must be used for control. Recent research has demonstrated an 83% reduction of gray mold in treated harvests.

=== Phytophthora root rot ===
If the conditions are right root rot can inflict yield losses up to 75% on a raspberry crop. Symptoms of the disease are destruction of root tissue and wilted primocanes and floricanes. Metalaxyl and fosetyl-al applied once in the fall or early spring have been shown to provide effective control of the disease.

=== Yellow rust ===
The primary modes of dispersal of yellow rust are wind and the splashing of raindrops, making wet conditions ideal for its spread. This means the Pacific Northwest is very susceptible to yellow rust. The symptoms of yellow rust are typically yellow pustules of the leaves that cause the leaves to fall from the plant. The fruit will also often die before it ripens. In favorable conditions entire fields can easily incur 100% yield loss. Oregon has estimated that treating fields with fungicides can provide 98–100% control of yellow rust, whereas uncontrolled yellow rust could reduce yields up to 25%.

== Rice ==
=== Sheath blight ===
Sheath blight, caused by the fungus Rhizoctonia solani, is one of the deadlier diseases of rice. Up to 50% of southern United States rice could be infected with sheath blight each year. Unlike most infections it does not produce spores and instead must be spread from contact through plants, rainwater, or the soil. It is a resilient disease that can survive for years in the soil even when there is no rice crop present. Symptoms include lesions on the sheath of the plant, which feed off the nutrients within the plant. These lesions give rise to brown fungus balls which, if the plant dies from nutrient starvation, fall to the ground. The following season, heavy rains may allow the balls to float to other plants, which they can then infect. Primary yield loss is therefore attributable to plant death and lower yields from the surviving plants due to the nutrient loss. Yield losses can be as high as 42%. Research data has demonstrated that one application of azoxystrobin at panicle differentiation can control sheath blight for almost the entire season.

=== Kernel smut ===
Kernel smut can be found throughout soils in the Mid-South where spores are able to survive up to two years without a crop being planted. When a crop is planted the disease infects the rice kernels during early development and replaces the starch inside with black kernel smut spores. These spores swell the plant until the grain eventually cannot contain the spores and bursts, releasing spores into the air. These spores either infect the current crop or land on the soil to infect the next year's crop. The disease harms the plant because when rice infected with kernel smut is harvested it often breaks during the milling process and is rendered useless. Research in Arkansas has recently shown that yield losses is about 10% when rice is left untreated. Propiconazole has been found to provide the best fungicidal control, offering 85–95% reduction in kernel smut.

=== False smut ===
False smut damages the rice plant by infecting the ovaries of the rice kernel in its early development. Once inside the disease takes over the ovary and replaces it with spores that burst, producing a large orange ball between the glumes. These galls not only are covered in spores that spread the disease but when harvested result in rice that must be cleaned before it can be sold. Use of propiconazole can reduce false smut by as much as 75%.

== Soybeans ==
=== Anthracnose ===
Anthracnose tends to develop late in the harvesting season, and is not a common soybean disease. It is caused by the fungus Colletotrichum truncatum. The fungus infects soybean by attaching to the surface of the plant and penetrating the tissue wall. From here anthracnose is able to spread spores throughout the plant, killing branches, pods, and leaves. Once the plant is infected the disease causes defoliation and reduced quality and quantity of soybean seeds. Foliar fungicides applied after blooming control the disease.

=== Frogeye leaf spot ===
Frogeye leaf spot can occur on all soybean crops but crops in warm and humid regions are most susceptible. The main symptom is circular, purple or red lesions on the foliage of the plant. As the number of lesions grows the leaves eventually wither and die. The disease can spread rapidly and often infects all the leaves of the plant. Yields from infected crops can be reduced by 15%. Fungicides applied at late flowering and the beginning of seed growth have been shown to protect against frogeye.

=== Rhizoctonia aerial blight ===
Rhizoctonia aerial blight attacks the soybean crop by infecting the plant during the flowering phase. It infects the tissue and produces lesions that eventually defoliate and rot the plant. Foliar fungicides have been shown to be effective at combating the disease.

=== Pod and stem blight ===
Pod and stem blight attack soybean plants during very wet seasons. It is caused by a number of species of the fungal genera Diaporthe and Phomopsis. They cause small black fruiting bodies to form on plant stems and pods. These fungi cause moldy, cracked, and shriveled seeds which in return produce low-quality oil and meal. Foliar fungicides applied between mid-flowing and late pod provide the best fungicidal control.

=== Soybean sudden death syndrome (SDS) ===
Soybean sudden death syndrome (SDS) is caused by numerous species of the fungus Fusarium. First symptoms show up after flowering, and include interveinal necrosis, with green veins. When the stem is split, the cortical tissue will be a tan to cream color. Eventually the plant will dry out and die. Planting resistant soybean cultivars and rotating out of infected fields will reduce disease.

== Spinach ==
=== Downy mildew ===
Until the late 1950s the United States spinach industry was not considered highly viable. Cultivars were vulnerable to downy mildew, which caused sharp reductions in quality and in select cases complete crop loss. Control by fungicide use was not practical. The spinach industry began to expand in 1947 when a strain of plant was introduced from Iran that was proven to be resistant to downy mildew. Therefore, it was not until the late 1970s that a new strain of the disease made downy mildew a problem for U.S. growers. The disease manifests as small yellow spots that quickly grow and rot the leaves. On the underside of the leaf blue mold spores grow and are spread to the rest of the spinach crop by wind. Epidemics occur quickly due to the fast-growing nature of the fungus. After the new strain was discovered and began to destroy spinach fields, testing began in the 1980s with fungicides to control the disease. Research showed that metalaxyl was effective, reducing yield loss from 43% to 1% in treated fields.

=== White rust ===
Albugo occidentalis was discovered in Texas in 1937 and primarily occurs in spinach crops found in eastern U.S. production areas. It has not been reported outside of the U.S. The main symptom of white rust is lesions on the leaf that grow and eventually release spores that cover and kill the entire leaf. Some cultivars of spinach have partial resistance to white rust but metalaxyl has been shown to be the best way to control the disease. It reduces yield loss from 50% in untreated plots to 1% in treated plots.

== Sugarbeets ==
=== Powdery mildew ===
Powdery mildew on sugarbeets can be found wherever the crop is grown in the U.S. It infects plants in the spring when the weather begins to get warm again. The spores land on the leaves and rapidly grow, forming a white mildew film on the foliage within a week of infection. This mildew penetrates the cell wall and begins to absorb nutrients from the leaves. This eventually turns the leaves yellow and kills them. If it proceeds uncontrolled the infection will spread through an entire field within a month. Tests have shown that when left untreated powdery mildew can reduce yields by 27%. Control is best achieved through the use of sulfur, which has been found to increase yields by 38%.

=== Cercospora leaf spot ===
Cercospora leaf spot infects sugarbeets by overwintering in the soil from the year's previous crop. It can survive up to two years without a sugarbeet crop being planted. Once attached to the plant the fungus penetrates the tissue and begins to infect and kill nearby tissue. As the disease progresses these individual rotted spots begin to come together to form massive areas of dead tissue. This causes severely infected leaves to eventually die. The plant responds by attempting to re-grow the leaf and using nutrients within the plant. This results in lowered sugar content and stunted growth. Losses due to the disease can be as high as 42%. Tetraconazole has been shown to provide the best control. Research demonstrated that treatments with tetraconazole increased the amount of sucrose extracted by 30%.

== Sweet corn ==
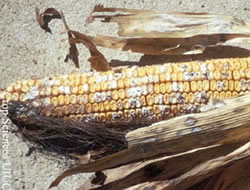
Corn mold

=== Northern corn leaf blight ===
As there are many strains, northern corn leaf blight (NCLB) is considered one of the most serious and hard to control diseases of sweet corn. Its multiple strains mean it is nearly impossible to attempt any control of NCLB with plant resistance. The symptoms of the disease include long, thin dead areas on the leaf that slowly grow and coalesce. These lesions produce spores that can infect other plants. However much of the spread and severity of the disease is dependent upon weather conditions. Heavy rains, low temperatures, and relatively high humidity increase the number of life cycles of the fungus, producing additional spores. The most common control practice for NCLB is chlorothalonil, maneb, and mancozeb.

=== Southern corn leaf blight ===
Southern corn leaf blight thrives in the southern United States because unlike NCLB it requires warm weather to develop. During favorable conditions the disease has been documented ruining a whole crop within days when left untreated. Treatment is available with the use of chlorothalonil, mancozeb, and maneb but even this is limited. In one study in Florida even when a regular fungicide plan was followed over 25% of the ears were lost.

=== Corn rust ===
Yield losses due to Puccinia sorghi can range from 20% to 50% of the crop depending upon when the infection strikes. If the disease attacks the corn early this will result in stunted growth of the ears and dried out kernels. However, this results in the lower end of crop yield loss. The greater damage comes when the infection appears later in the season because, although yield remains the same, extensive cosmetic damage to the corn—pustules cover the leaves, husks, necks, and tassels of the plant—renders much of it becomes unmarketable. This can result in up to 50% loss of yield.

== See also ==
- Pesticides
- Fungicides
- Pesticide use in the United States
- List of fungicides
