= Golden Death =

Golden Death may refer to:

- "Golden Death", ninth episode of the 1966 Doctor Who serial The Daleks' Master Plan
- Golden death of almond
