= Rhizopus =

- Schematic diagram of Rhizopus spp.

Scientific classification
- Kingdom: Fungi
- Division: Mucoromycota
- Class: Mucoromycetes
- Order: Mucorales
- Family: Mucoraceae
- Genus: Rhizopus; Ehrenb. (1820)

Type species
- Rhizopus nigricans Ehrenb. (1820)

Synonyms
- Crinofera Nieuwl. (1916); Pilophora Wallr. (1833)

Genus of fungi

Rhizopus is a genus of common saprophytic fungi on plants and specialized parasites on animals. They are found in a wide variety of organic substances, including "mature fruits and vegetables", jellies, syrups, leather, bread, peanuts, and tobacco. They are multicellular. Some Rhizopus species are opportunistic human pathogens that often cause fatal disease called mucormycosis. This widespread genus includes at least eight species.

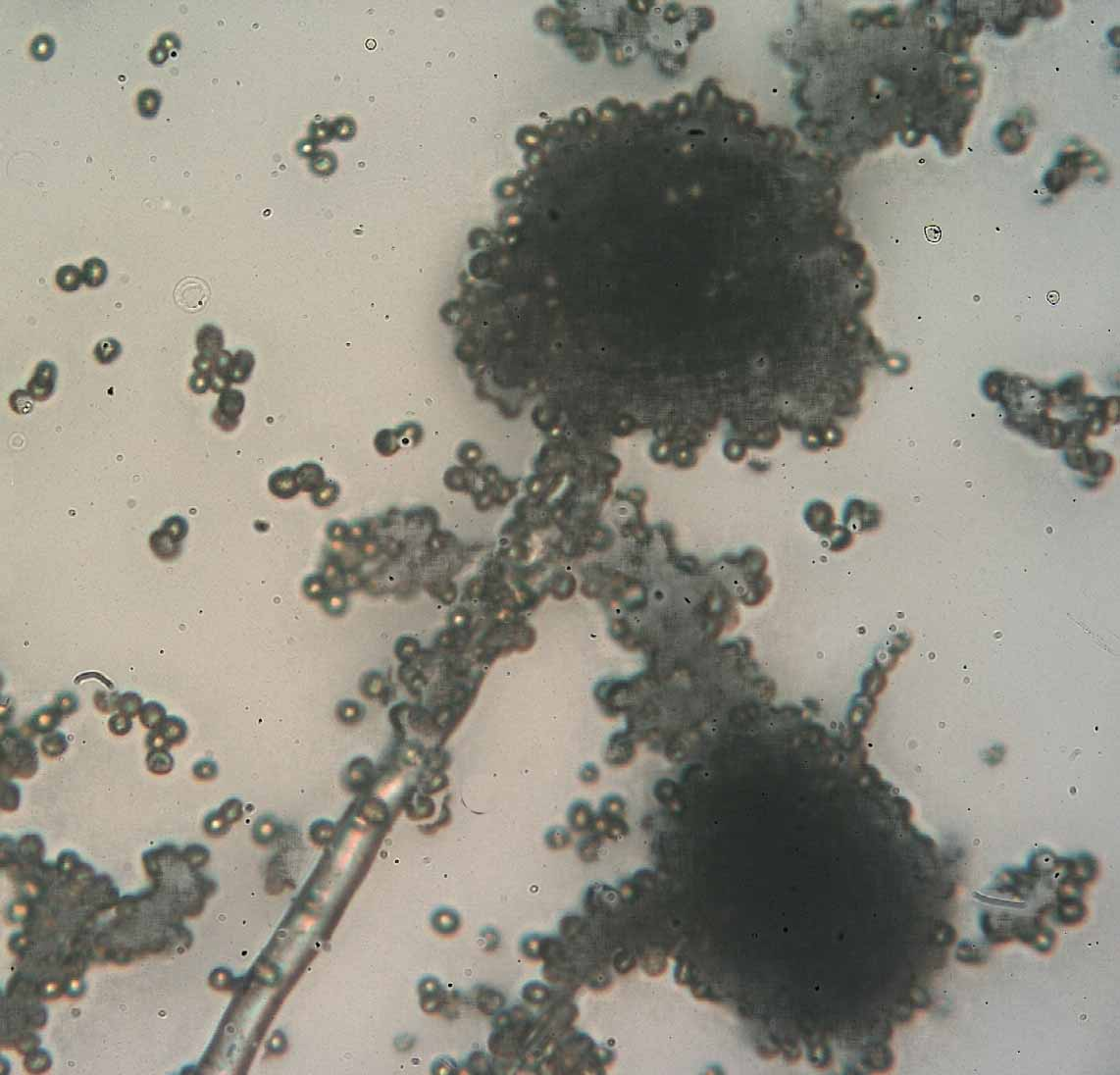
Rhizopus 400x magnification

== Description ==
Rhizopus species grow as filamentous, branching hyphae that generally lack cross-walls (i.e., they are coenocytic). They reproduce by forming asexual and sexual spores. In asexual reproduction, spores are produced inside a spherical structure, the sporangium. Sporangia are supported by a large apophysate columella atop a long stalk, the sporangiophore. Sporangiophores arise among distinctive, root-like rhizoids. In sexual reproduction, a dark zygospore is produced at the point where two compatible mycelia fuse. Upon germination, a zygospore produces colonies that are genetically different from either parent.

- Rhizopus oligosporus is used to make tempeh, a fermented food derived from soybeans.
- Rhizopus oryzae is used in the production of alcoholic beverages in parts of Asia and Africa.
- Rhizopus stolonifer (black bread mold) causes fruit rot on strawberry, tomato, and Sweet potato and is used in commercial production of fumaric acid and cortisone.

Various species, including R. stolonifer, may cause soft rot in sweet potatoes and Narcissus.

Rhizopus increases the nutrient content of soils by degrading certain toxins and inhibiting the growth of Aspergillus flavus, a toxigenic fungus. In addition to that, there is even a type of Rhizopus (Rhizopus microsporus-fermented soybean tempe) that has proven to reduce colon carcinogenesis in rats by elevating factors of mucins, immunoglobulin A, and organic acids and give protection to piglets from other Escherichia coli-infection by inhibiting adhesion to the intestinal membranes.

== Phylogeny ==
Rhizopus oryzae has heterothallic mating with a + and a - mating type. Rhizopus species have large genomes with evidence of full genome duplication.

== Species ==
- Rhizopus americanus
- Rhizopus arrhizus
- Rhizopus azygosporus
- Rhizopus caespitosus
- Rhizopus circinans
- Rhizopus delemar
- Rhizopus homothallicus
- Rhizopus lyococcus
- Rhizopus microsporus
- Rhizopus niveus
- Rhizopus oligosporus
- Rhizopus oryzae
- Rhizopus reflexus
- Rhizopus rhizopodiformis
- Rhizopus schipperae
- Rhizopus sexualis
- Rhizopus stolonifer (black bread mold)

== See also ==
- Black bread mold
- Mucormycosis
