= Rhizopus niveus =

Scientific classification
- Kingdom: Fungi
- Division: Mucoromycota
- Class: Mucoromycetes
- Order: Mucorales
- Family: Mucoraceae
- Genus: Rhizopus
- Species: R. niveus

Binomial name
- Rhizopus niveus (Link) M. Yamazaki (1919)

Species of filamentous fungi

Rhizopus niveus is a filamentous fungi that can be found almost anywhere in the world. It is used in industry for the production of enzymes. Rhizopus niveus was originally isolated from Qū for Jiuniang manufactured in Hangzhou, China. Similarly to other Rhizopus species, Rhizopus niveus is saprophytic and grows commonly on many organic substrates. Unlike other Rhizopus species, it has the capacity to ferment galactose.

== Taxonomy ==
Rhizopus niveus was classified by M. Yamazaki in “Some species of Rhizopus from Chinese yeast”, which was published in the Journal of the Society of Agriculture Tokyo in 1919. Reclassification of Rhizopus niveus to Rhizopus delemar (which itself has been reclassified as Rhizopus arrhizus) has been proposed due to the similarity of their DNA.

== Description ==
The sporangiophores of Rhizopus niveus are rare, "do not grow well", and are usually either close to colorless or a pale yellowish-brown. When formed, the sporangiophores have smooth walls, are circinate, and semi-circularly curve from the base. The sporangia of Rhizopus niveus are completely smooth and globose or subglobose, without the spines common to other Rhizopus species. Rhizopus niveus' columellae are the same color as its sporangiophores (almost colorless or pale yellowish-brown). The walls of columellae are smooth.

Spores of Rhizopus niveus may be faintly striated, or even lacking in striation, and are also usually elliptical shaped. Zygospores of Rhizopus niveus are bag-shaped and pale yellow or yellowish-brown. Rhizopus niveus may rarely form chlamydospores on stolons. Rhizoids are rarely formed by Rhizopus niveus, and when they are formed are very short. As with all Rhizopus species, niveus grows rapidly through stolons, which are typically colorless in young cultures, before darkening to pale yellow or brownish-grey in mature cultures. The turf Rhizopus niveus creates is white or pale yellow, with few sporangia. Rhizopus niveus produces fumaric acid, similarly to Rhizopus oryzae.

== Enzymes ==
As a filamentous fungi, Rhizopus niveus naturally secretes high quantities of a number of varied enzymes.

=== Ribonuclease ===
Crystals of ribonuclease Rh were crystallized via a vapor diffusion technique from Rhizopus niveus. There were two distinct types of crystals generated, both of which belong to the orthorhombic space group P2_{1}2_{1}2_{1}. Crystals of type I had dimensions of a = 68.3Å, b = 73.0Å, c = 50.0Å, while crystals of type II had dimensions of a = 67.5Å, b = 72.3Å, c = 44.2Å.

=== Glucoamylase ===
Rhizopus niveus creates at least five different glucoamylase forms. Of them, two major forms, termed glucoamylase C and glucoamylase D exhibited specific activities of 8.55 and 9.23 units/mg protein, debranching activities of 0.46 and 0.40, isoelectric points of 8.45 and 9.1, carbohydrate contents of 14.9 and 12.7%, and hydrolysis limits of boiled soluble starch of 62% and 67%, respectively.

Analysis of the hydrolysis of wheat and corn starch by the glucoamylase of Rhizopus niveus indicated the glucoamylase attacked the surface of granules uniformly. The glucoamylase from Rhizopus niveus attacks granules similarly to Rhizopus amagasakiens, forming small pits across the surface of granules. The glucoamylase of Rhizopus niveus was additionally twice as effective as glucoamylase II from Aspergillus niger.

Relevant to the discussion of taxonomy, the glucoamylase conformation of Rhizopus niveus is almost the same as Rhizopus arrhizus (also known as Rhizopus delemar).

=== Lipase ===
Rhizopus niveus is among the principal producers of fungal microbial lipase in industry. This lipase has successfully been used in the interesterification of butter fat. Specifically, the lipase from Rhizopus niveus has been used to produce cacao butter substitute.

There are at least two distinct types of lipase produced by Rhizopus niveus. Lipase I consists of two polypeptide chains, and is similar to the lipase produced by Rhizopus arrhizus. Lipase II, unlike Lipase I, consists of a single polypeptide chain. The primary structure of Lipase II is very similar to the lipase produced by Rhizomucor miehei. Lipase II is produced from Lipase I by limited proteolysis from a serine protease.

=== Other potential applications ===
Given the high capacity for Rhizopus niveus to secrete enzymes, and the ability to modify niveus' DNA, there is potential industrial use for Rhizopus niveus in the production of other enzymes. Barriers to using Rhizopus niveus as such are the time consuming methods of modifying Rhizopus niveus' DNA and the low-copy number of the introduced DNA per haploid genome.
