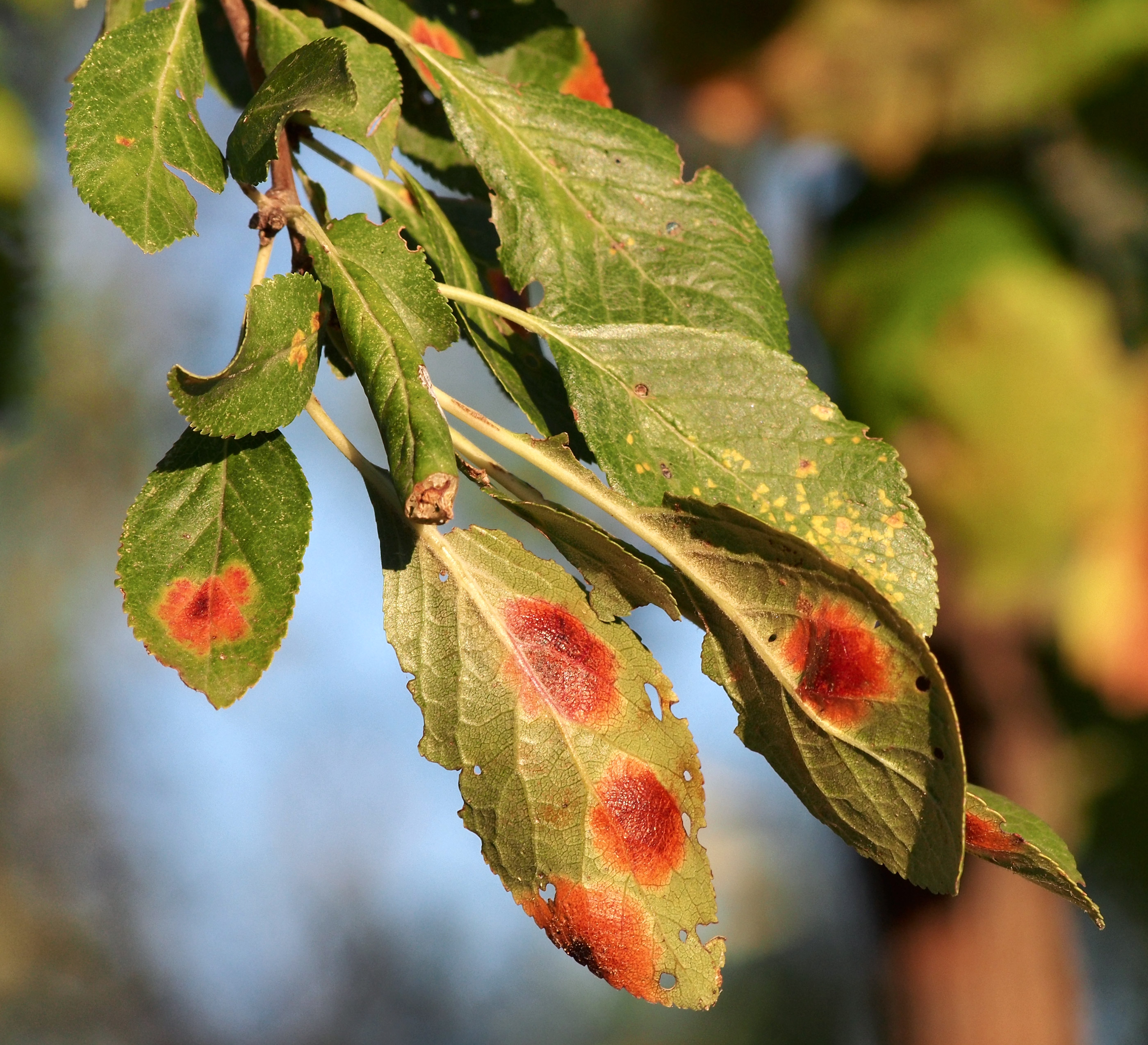

Scientific classification
- Domain: Eukaryota
- Kingdom: Fungi
- Division: Ascomycota
- Class: Sordariomycetes
- Order: Phyllachorales
- Family: Phyllachoraceae
- Genus: Polystigma; DC.

Type species
- Polystigma rubrum (Pers.) DC.

Species
- Species include: Polystigma fulvum; Polystigma rubrum

= Polystigma =

Genus of fungi

Polystigma is a genus of fungi in the family Phyllachoraceae.
