= Rhizopus soft rot =

Disease

- Causal agents: Rhizopus stolonifer
- Hosts: sweet potato
- EPPO Code: RIZPST

Rhizopus soft rot is a disease of the sweet potato. It is one of the most common to affect the sweet potato, happening during packing and shipping. The disease causes a watery soft rot of the internal portion of the storage root. Strategies to manage the disease include the development of resistant varieties, curing through the use of heat and humidity, and application of decay control products.

== Background ==
Sweet potatoes are susceptible to a number of diseases during the postharvest storage period and during shipping. The most common are Rhizopus soft rot (Rhizopus stolonifer), bacterial soft rot (Erwinia chrysanthemii), Fusarium root rot (Fusarium solani), Fusarium surface rot (Fusarium oxysporum), and black rot (Ceratocystis fimbriata).

R. stolonifer is a problematic pathogen as it infects fresh wounds occurring during packing and shipping. There is limited data on the exact losses attributed to Rhizopus soft rot. A study conducted in the New York City retail market found that the majority of culls due to disease were caused by Rhizopus soft rot (approximately 2% decay in survey). Anecdotal reports suggest that Rhizopus soft rot is unpredictably sporadic and generally results in heavy losses to entire shipments when it does occur.

R. stolonifer has a wide host range and can affect over 300 plant species including fruits, vegetables, and ornamentals. R. stolonifer (Ehrenb. ex Fr.) (syn R. nigricans) was first described in 1818 and first recognized as a pathogen on sweetpotato in 1890.

== Symptoms and signs ==
Symptoms of R. stolonifer infection of sweet potatoes include rapid development of a watery soft rot of the internal portion of the storage root with the periderm generally remaining intact. Infection can occur anywhere on the root but usually initiates at the ends due to the inevitable wounding resulting from harvest, or because a root's tapered ends are more likely to be injured. A milder infection of R. stolonifer occurring away from the ends results in ring rot or collar rot, in which the pathogen typically only causes rotting in a portion of the root. This rotting forms a relatively superficial dry ring around the root. Rhizopus soft rot produces a characteristic fermentation odor. Roots may dry and mummify with only the periderm and root fibers remaining intact because of the inability of the fungus to break down the lignin in these components. Characteristic signs of Rhizopus soft rot include the production of tufts of white hyphae which break through the surface of the root and produce large numbers of brown-black sporangiophores (34 μm diameter by 1000-3500 μm length) which support a sporangium (100-350 μm diameter). Sporangiospores (4-11 μm diameter) are produced in the sporangium and are unicellular, ovoid and brown. Sporangiospores serve as the primary inoculum and are passively released when the outer layer of the sporangium breaks down. Other R. stolonifer structures include stolons and rhizoids. Stolons arch over the surface and rhizoids grow into the substrate at each point of contact between stolon and substrate.

Sexual recombination is rare and occurs when mycelium of two compatible strains come in contact. Progametangia from each strain grow towards each other and fuse into gametangia, forming a thick-walled zygospore. Zygospores germinate to form sporangiophores bearing a single sporangium. R. stolonifer is incapable of breaching the intact root periderm and requires a wound to initiate infection. The type of wound influences infectivity, with smooth wounds less likely to be infected than impact bruise/crushed tissue wounds. It has been suggested that smooth wounds (slices or scrapes) lack the quantity of nutrients required for spore germ tube formation. No research has been completed to identify the degree of impact bruising required for infection to be initiated.

== Disease management ==
Effective management strategies for Rhizopus soft rot on sweetpotato include planting resistant varieties in well-drained soil, preventing injury through handling and transport, crop rotation, proper curing after harvest, and decay control product applications on packinglines.

=== Resistant varieties ===
The sweet potato industry readily accepts new cultivars, which leads to a quick shift in the most widely grown cultivar. Beauregard, released in 1987, is currently the dominant cultivar grown in the U.S. Beauregard is considered to be moderately resistant to R. stolonifer although sporadic, heavy losses during shipping are known to occur. No cultivar has been found that is completely resistant to Rhizopus soft rot.

=== Curing ===
Curing immediately after harvest generally eliminates losses to R. stolonifer by healing wounds occurring during harvest. The current recommended curing process is to expose the roots to high temperature at 29 °C (84 °F) and high relative humidity of 90% for five to seven days. Curing induces suberization of wounds followed by new periderm formation (this process was called wound "cork" or "phellum" in early research), effectively healing the wounds.

=== Decay control products ===
R. stolonifer is most commonly managed by packing line applications of dicloran (also known as DCNA or Botran). Dicloran, a chlorinated nitro-aniline, is a broad spectrum fungicide registered for postharvest use on sweet potatoes and in-field use for several fruits, vegetables, and ornamentals. However, the application of such a fungicide directly on the product raises significant concern for regulatory agencies and consumers. There has been a growing interest in the use of biological control organisms for control of postharvest diseases of fruits and vegetables. Control of Rhizopus soft rot of sweet potatoes by biological control products has been variable.
