= Fusicoccin =

Fusicoccin A

Names
- IUPAC name (2S)-2-[(1S,4R,5R,6R,6aS,9S,9aE,10aR)-4-{[3-O-Acetyl-6-O-(2-methyl-3-buten-2-yl)-α-D-glucopyranosyl]oxy}-1,5-dihydroxy-9-(methoxymethyl)-6,10a-dimethyl-1,2,4,5,6,6a,7,8,9,10a-decahydrodicyclopenta[a,d][8]annulen-3-yl]propyl acetate

Identifiers
CAS Number	20108-30-9
3D model (JSmol)	Interactive image
ChemSpider	394625
DrugBank	DB01780
PubChem CID	447573
CompTox Dashboard (EPA)	DTXSID80896943
- InChI: InChI=1S/C36H56O12/c1-10-35(6,7)45-17-26-30(41)33(46-21(5)38)31(42)34(47-26)48-32-28-24(18(2)15-44-20(4)37)13-27(39)36(28,8)14-25-22(16-43-9)11-12-23(25)19(3)29(32)40/h10,14,18-19,22-23,26-27,29-34,39-42H,1,11-13,15-17H2,2-9H3/b25-14-/t18-,19-,22-,23+,26-,27+,29-,30-,31-,32-,33+,34-,36+/m1/s1 Key: KXTYBXCEQOANSX-WYKQKOHHSA-N; InChI=1/C36H56O12/c1-10-35(6,7)45-17-26-30(41)33(46-21(5)38)31(42)34(47-26)48-32-28-24(18(2)15-44-20(4)37)13-27(39)36(28,8)14-25-22(16-43-9)11-12-23(25)19(3)29(32)40/h10,14,18-19,22-23,26-27,29-34,39-42H,1,11-13,15-17H2,2-9H3/b25-14-/t18-,19-,22-,23+,26-,27+,29-,30-,31-,32-,33+,34-,36+/m1/s1 Key: KXTYBXCEQOANSX-WYKQKOHHBW
- SMILES: O=C(OC[C@H](\C3=C2/[C@@H](O[C@H]1O[C@@H]([C@@H](O)[C@H](OC(=O)C)[C@H]1O)COC(\C=C)(C)C)[C@H](O)[C@H](C)[C@H]4C(=C/[C@@]2(C)[C@@H](O)C3)\[C@@H](COC)CC4)C)C

Properties
Chemical formula	C_{36}H_{56}O_{12}
Molar mass	680.832 g·mol^{−1}
- Except where otherwise noted, data are given for materials in their standard state (at 25 °C [77 °F], 100 kPa). Infobox references

Fusicoccins are organic compounds produced by a fungus. It has detrimental effect on plants and causes their death.

Fusicoccins are diterpenoid glycosides produced by the fungus Fusicoccum amygdali, which is a parasite of mainly almond and peach trees. It stimulates a quick acidification of the plant cell wall; this causes the stomata to irreversibly open, which brings about the death of the plant.

Fusicoccins contains three fused carbon rings and another ring which contains an oxygen atom and five carbons.

Fusicoccin was and is extensively used in research regarding the plant hormone auxin and its mechanisms.

== Biosynthesis ==
Fusicoccin is a member of a diterpenoid class which shares a 5-8-5 ring structure and is called fusicoccane. In fungi, fusicoccin is biosynthesized via Phomopsis amygdali fusicoccadiene synthase (PaFS) from universal C5 isoprene units dimethylallyl diphosphate (DMAPP) and isopentenyl diphosphate (IPP). PaFS has two domains, a C-terminal prenyltransferase domain which converts isoprene units into geranylgeranyl diphosphate (GGDP) and an N-terminal terpene cyclase domain where GGDP gets cyclized and turns into fusicocca-2,10(14)-diene. It is also reported in this study that a 2-oxoglutarate-dependent dioxygenase-like gene, a cytochrome P450 monooxygenase-like gene, a short-chain dehydrogenase/reductase-like gene, and an α-mannosidase-like gene at the 3’ location downstream of PaFS which are responsible for converting fusicocca-2,10(14)-diene into fusicoccin. Two enzymes, one dioxygenase and PAPT, are in charge of catalyzing a hydroxylation at the 3-position of fusicocca-2,10(14)-diene-8β,16-diol and prenylation of the hydroxyl group of glucose in fusicoccin P, respectively.

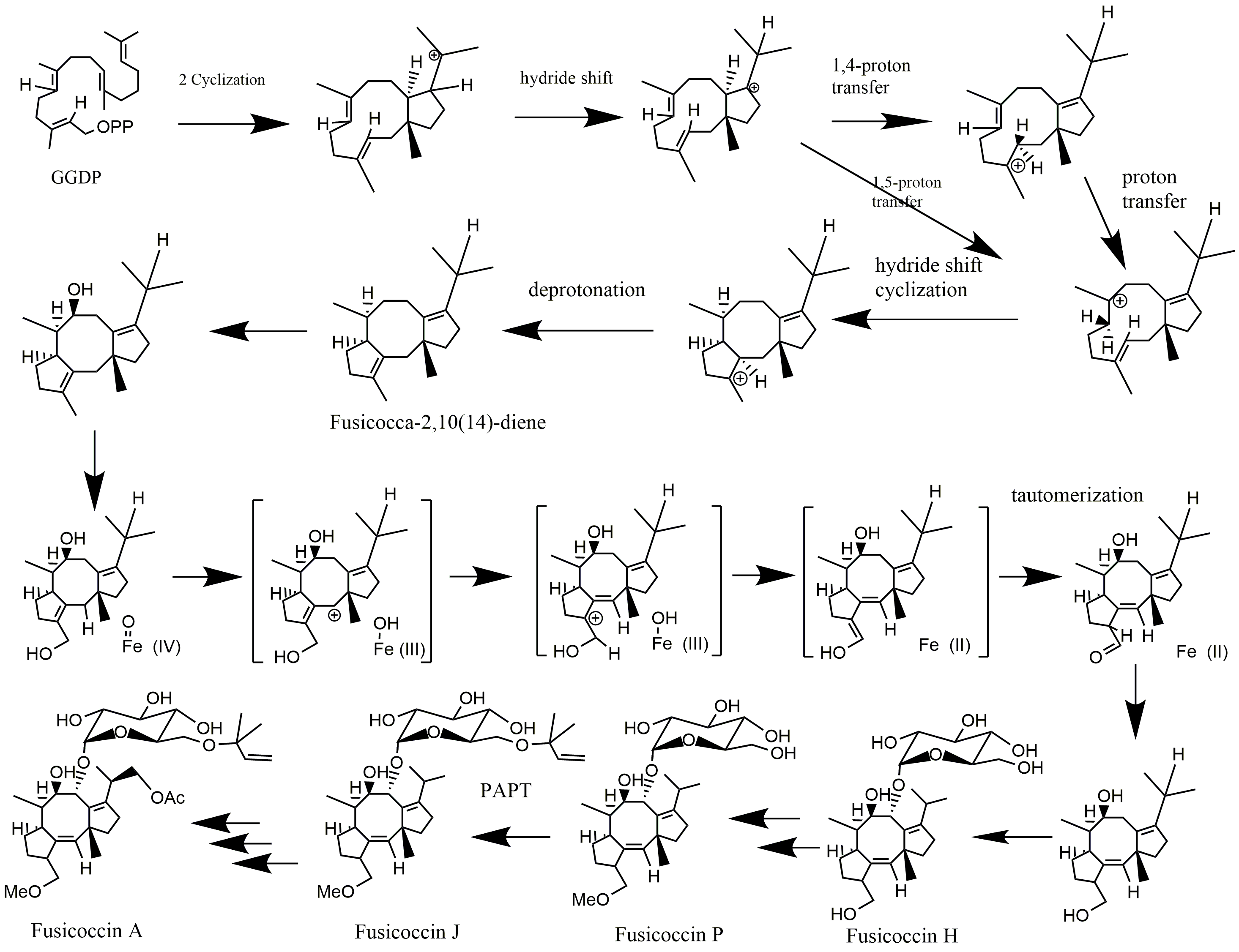
Biosynthesis Pathway of Fusicoccins
