= Tebuconazole =

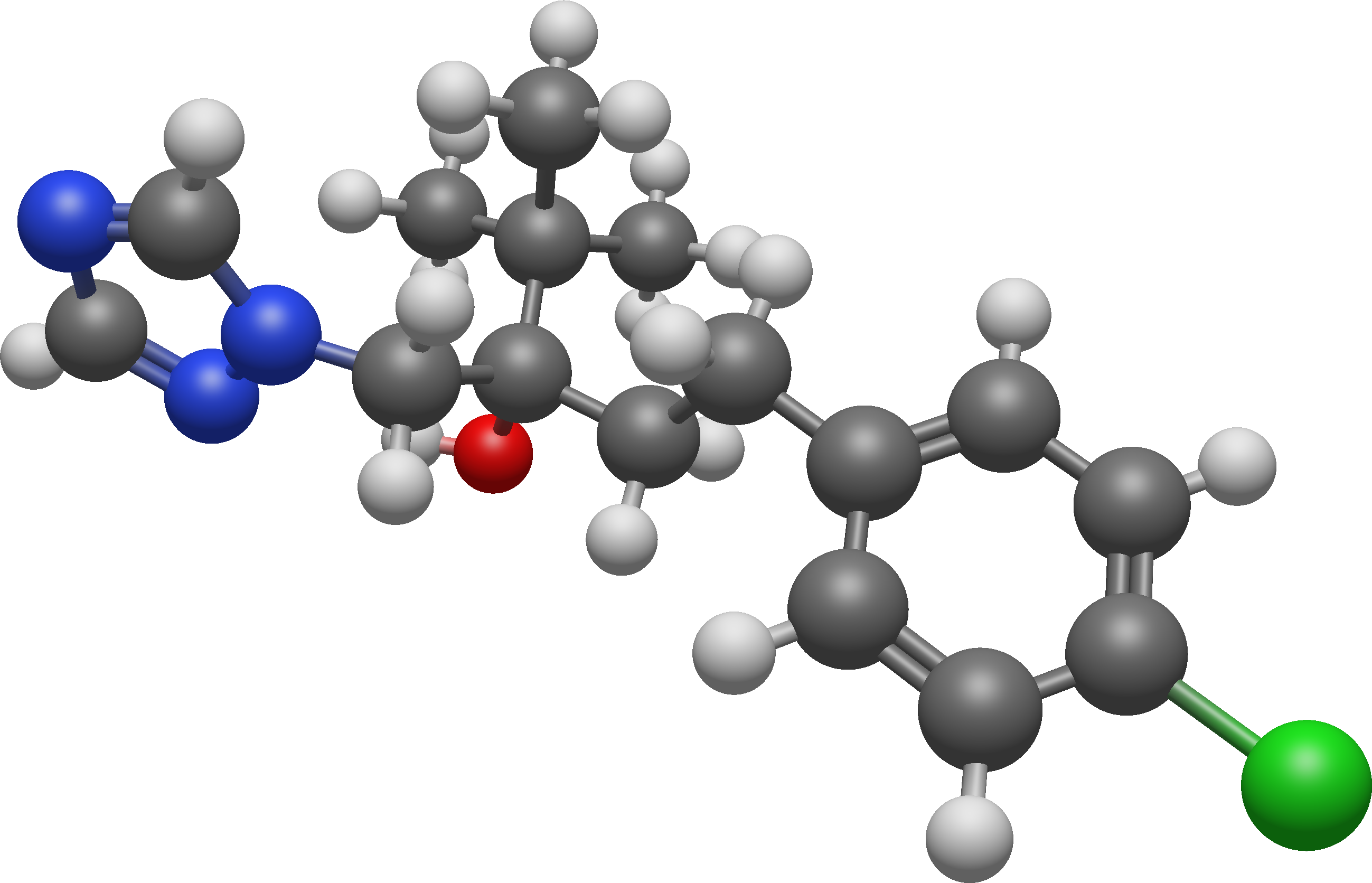

Names
- IUPAC name (RS)- 1-(4-Chlorophenyl)- 4,4-dimethyl-3-(1H, 1,2,4-triazol-1-ylmethyl)pentan- 3-ol
- Other names (±)-1-(4-Chlorophenyl)-4,4-dimethyl-3-(1H, 1,2,4-triazol-1-ylmethyl)pentan-3-ol

Identifiers
CAS Number	107534-96-3
3D model (JSmol)	Interactive image
ChEBI	CHEBI:81781
ChEMBL	ChEMBL487186
ChemSpider	77680
ECHA InfoCard	100.100.535
PubChem CID	86102
UNII	401ATW8TRW
CompTox Dashboard (EPA)	DTXSID9032113
- InChI: InChI=1S/C16H22ClN3O/c1-15(2,3)16(21,10-20-12-18-11-19-20)9-8-13-4-6-14(17)7-5-13/h4-7,11-12,21H,8-10H2,1-3H3 Key: PXMNMQRDXWABCY-UHFFFAOYSA-N; InChI=1/C16H22ClN3O/c1-15(2,3)16(21,10-20-12-18-11-19-20)9-8-13-4-6-14(17)7-5-13/h4-7,11-12,21H,8-10H2,1-3H3 Key: PXMNMQRDXWABCY-UHFFFAOYAS
- SMILES: CC(C)(C)C(CCC1=CC=C(C=C1)Cl)(CN2C=NC=N2)O

Properties
Chemical formula	C_{16}H_{22}ClN_{3}O
Molar mass	307.82 g·mol^{−1}
Density	1.249 g/cm^{3} at 20 °C
Melting point	102.4 °C (216.3 °F; 375.5 K)
Solubility in water	0.032 g/L at 20 °C
- Except where otherwise noted, data are given for materials in their standard state (at 25 °C [77 °F], 100 kPa). verify (what is ?) Infobox references

Tebuconazole is a triazole fungicide used agriculturally to treat plant pathogenic fungi.

== Environmental hazards ==
Though the U.S. Food and Drug Administration considers this fungicide to be safe for humans, it may still pose a risk. It is listed as a possible carcinogen in the United States Environmental Protection Agency Office of Pesticide Programs carcinogen list with a rating of C (possible carcinogen). Its acute toxicity is moderate. According to the World Health Organization toxicity classification, it is listed as III, which means slightly hazardous.

Due to the potential for endocrine-disrupting effects, tebuconazole was assessed by the Swedish Chemicals Agency as being potentially removed from the market by EU regulation 1107/2009.
