= Leucocytospora leucostoma =

Scientific classification
- Kingdom: Fungi
- Division: Ascomycota
- Class: Sordariomycetes
- Order: Diaporthales
- Family: Valsaceae
- Genus: Leucocytospora
- Species: L. leucostoma

Binomial name
- Leucocytospora leucostoma (Fr.) Höhn. (1917)

Species of fungus

Leucocytospora leucostoma is a plant pathogen.
