= Rhizopus circinans =

Scientific classification
- Kingdom: Fungi
- Division: Mucoromycota
- Class: Mucoromycetes
- Order: Mucorales
- Family: Mucoraceae
- Genus: Rhizopus
- Species: R. circinans

Binomial name
- Rhizopus circinans Tiegh. (1878)

Species of fungus

Rhizopus circinans is a plant pathogen infecting almond, apricot and peach.
