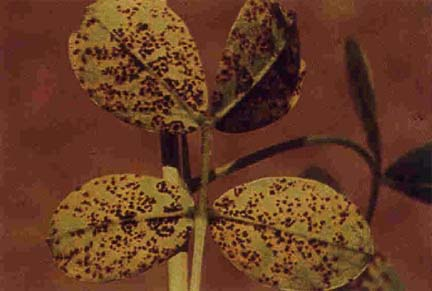

Scientific classification
- Domain: Eukaryota
- Kingdom: Fungi
- Division: Basidiomycota
- Class: Pucciniomycetes
- Order: Pucciniales
- Family: Pucciniaceae
- Genus: Puccinia
- Species: P. arachidis

Binomial name
- Puccinia arachidis Speg. (1884)

Synonyms
- Bullaria arachidis (Speg.) Arthur & Mains, (1922); Uromyces arachidis Henn., (1896)

= Puccinia arachidis =

Species of fungus

Puccinia arachidis, or peanut rust, is a plant pathogen that causes rust on peanut. Its spread is promoted by warm, damp weather.

== See also ==
- List of Puccinia species
