= Rhizopus arrhizus =

Scientific classification
- Kingdom: Fungi
- Division: Mucoromycota
- Class: Mucoromycetes
- Order: Mucorales
- Family: Mucoraceae
- Genus: Rhizopus
- Species: R. arrhizus

Binomial name
- Rhizopus arrhizus (Fisher)

Species of fungus

Rhizopus arrhizus is a fungus of the family Mucoraceae, characterized by sporangiophores that arise from nodes at the point where the rhizoids are formed and by a hemispherical columella. It is the most common cause of mucormycosis in humans and occasionally infects other animals.

Rhizopus arrhizus spores contain ribosomes as a spore ultrastructure.

Metabolism in the fungus changes from aerobic to fermentation at various points in its life cycle.

== Nutrition ==
R. arrhizus produces siderophores which are also usable to adjacent plants. Holzberg & Artis 1983 finds a hydroxamate siderophore and Shenker et al. 1992 provides a method for detection of a carboxylate.

== Plant diseases ==
See:

- List of almond diseases
- List of apricot diseases
- List of beet diseases
- List of carrot diseases
- List of mango diseases
- List of maize diseases
- List of peach and nectarine diseases
- List of sunflower diseases

R. arrhizus does not infect grape first or alone but is instead secondary. This fungus colonizes grape after another pathogen has begun degrading tissues and as such is better diagnosed by molecular diagnostics, especially in early stages when the difference between single and complex infection is not visually tractable.

=== Management ===
Howell & Stipanovic 1983 find gliovirin is not effective against R. arrhizus.

== Uses ==
Rhizopus arrhizus can be used for bio-remediation, i.e., is useful in treating uranium and thorium-affected soils.
