= Polystigma fulvum =

Scientific classification
- Kingdom: Fungi
- Division: Ascomycota
- Class: Sordariomycetes
- Order: Phyllachorales
- Family: Phyllachoraceae
- Genus: Polystigma
- Species: P. fulvum

Binomial name
- Polystigma fulvum Pers. ex DC., (1815)

Synonyms
- Dothidea fulva Dothidea ochracea Hypocrea fulva Polystigma aurantiacum Polystigma ochraceum Polystigma ochraceum var. aurantiacum Polystigma ochraceum var. ochraceum Sphaeria ochracea Sphaeria padi Sphaeria xantha Xyloma aurantiacum

Species of fungus

Polystigma fulvum is a plant pathogen infecting almonds.
