= Stripe rust =

Stripe rust may refer to:

- Barley stripe rust
- Wheat stripe rust
