= Fusicoccum amygdali =

Scientific classification
- Kingdom: Fungi
- Division: Ascomycota
- Class: Dothideomycetes
- Order: Botryosphaeriales
- Family: Botryosphaeriaceae
- Genus: Fusicoccum
- Species: F. amygdali

Binomial name
- Fusicoccum amygdali Delacr., (1905)

Synonyms
- Phomopsis amygdali (Delacr.) J.J. Tuset & M.T. Portilla, (1989)

Species of fungus

Fusicoccum amygdali is a plant pathogen, which often releases a toxin known as fusicoccin that causes the stomata of the plant to open.
