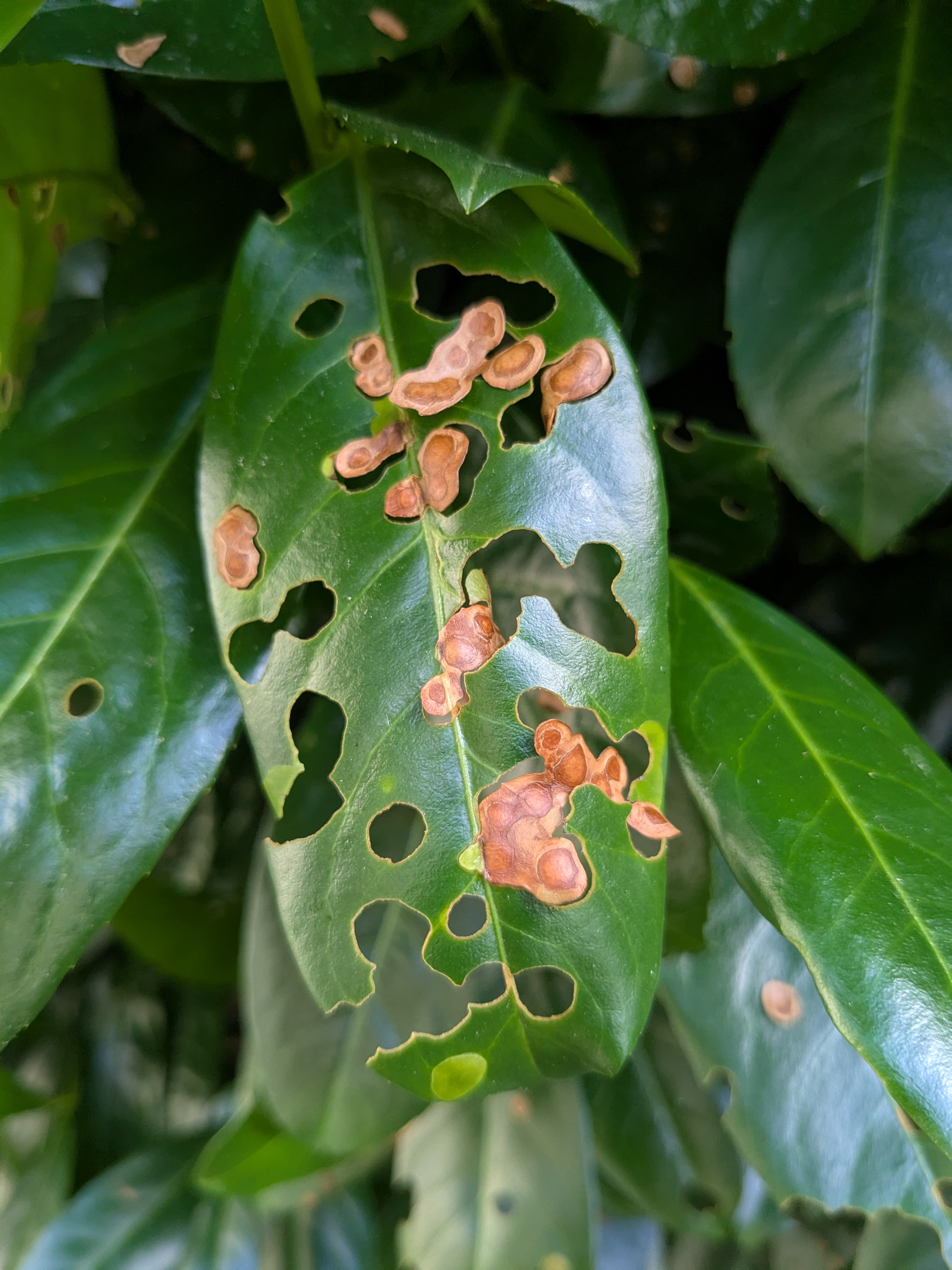

Scientific classification
- Kingdom: Fungi
- Division: Ascomycota
- Class: Dothideomycetes
- Order: Mycosphaerellales
- Family: Mycosphaerellaceae
- Genus: Stigmina
- Species: S. carpophila

Binomial name
- Stigmina carpophila (Lév.) M.B.Ellis (1959)

Synonyms
- Ascospora beijerinckii Asterula beijerinckii Cladosporium beijerinckii Clasterosporium amygdalearum Clasterosporium carpophilum Coryneum beyerinckii Coryneum carpophilum Coryneum laurocerasi Helminthosporium carpophilum Helminthosporium cerasorum Helminthosporium rhabdiferum Macrosporium rhabdiferum Napicladium brunaudii Passalora brunaudii Sciniatosporium carpophilum Septosporium cerasorum Sporidesmium amygdalearum Sporocadus carpophilus Stigmella briosiana Stigmina briosiana Wilsonomyces carpophilus

= Stigmina carpophila =

Species of fungus

Stigmina carpophila (syn. Wilsonomyces carpophilus) also known as Cherry Shot Hole is a fungal plant pathogen causing shot hole disease in stone fruits (Prunus spp.).
