= Shot hole disease =

Fungal disease of plants

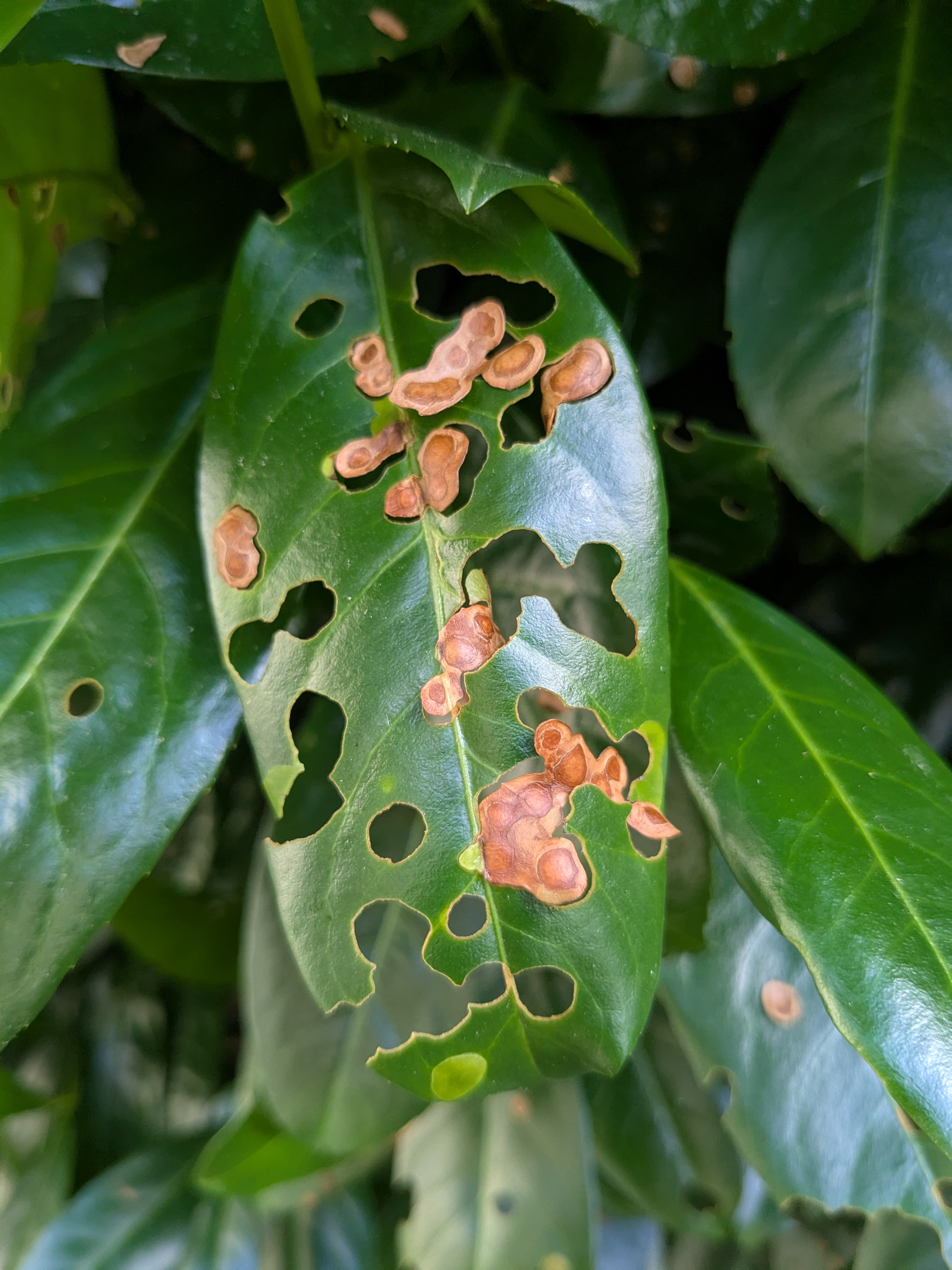
leaves of cherry laurel with shot hole disease infection

Shot hole disease (also called Coryneum blight) or Cherry Shot Hole is a serious fungal disease that creates shot-sized holes in leaves, rough areas on fruit, and concentric lesions on branches. It is caused by the pathogen Wilsonomyces carpophilus.

== Hosts and symptoms ==
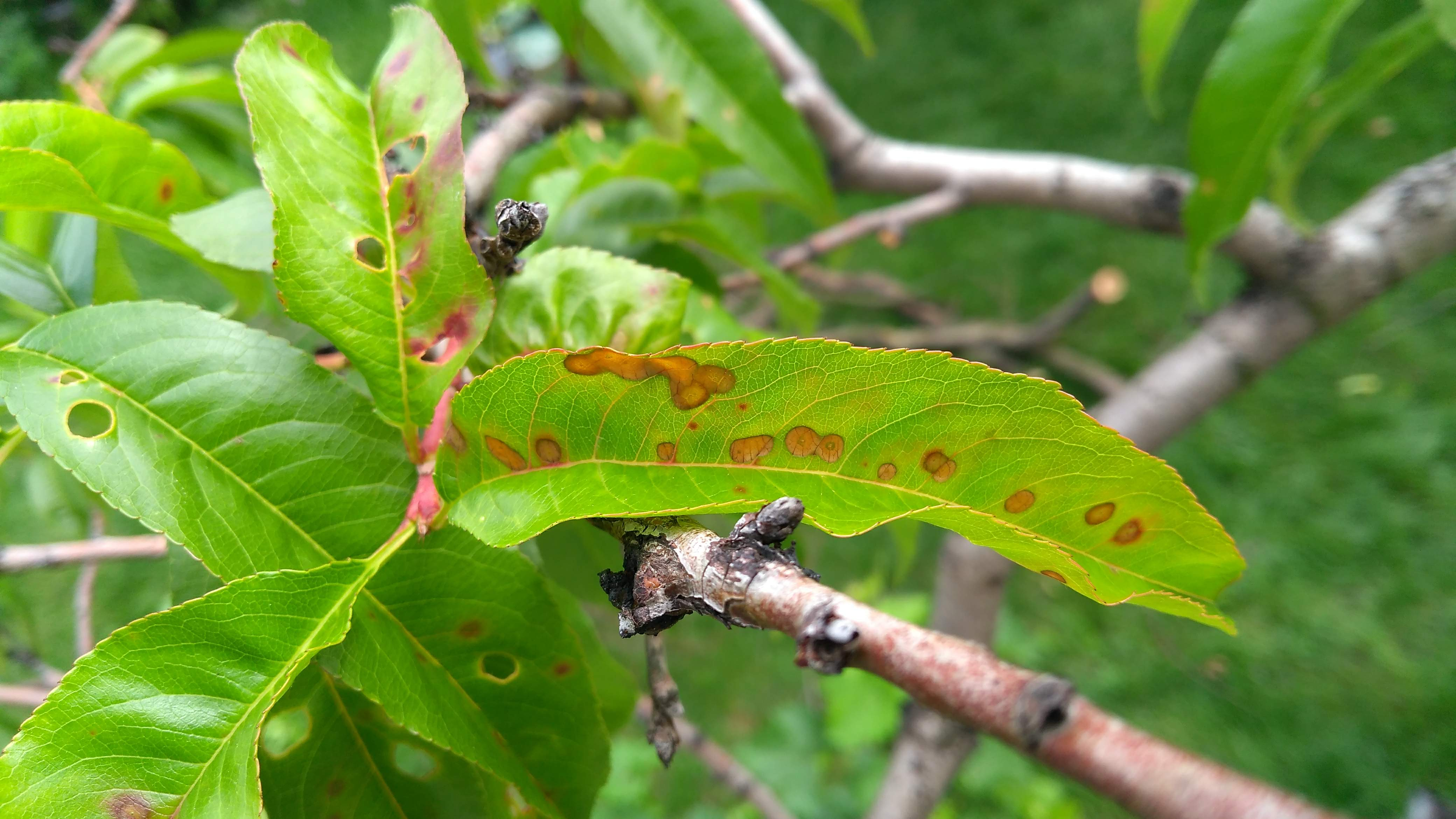
Peach tree leaves displaying various stages of the shot hole disease: brown spots on the leaf with conidium holders in the middle (center) that eventually fall off, leaving BB-sized holes behind (left)

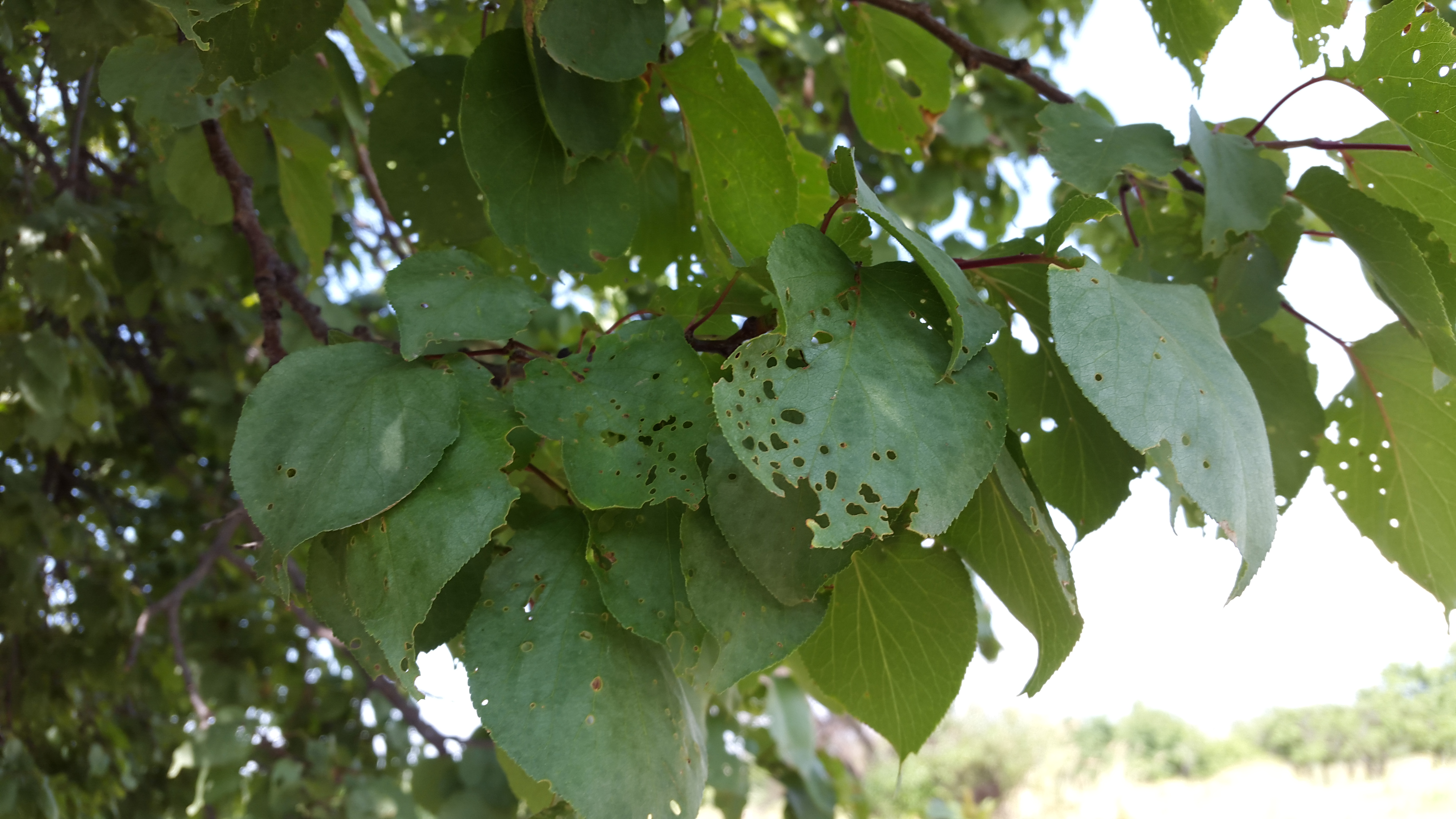
Shot hole disease of apricot leaves

The fungal pathogen Wilsonomyces carpophilus affects members of the Prunus genera. Almond, apricot, nectarine, peach, plum and cherry trees can be affected. Both edible and ornamental varieties are vulnerable to infection. Almost all over-ground parts of the plants are affected including the fruits, buds and the stems, but the damage is most noticeable on the leaves. The symptoms begin with small (1/10-1/4”) reddish or purplish-brown spots with light green or yellow ring around them. As the disease progresses the damaged areas become slightly larger and then dry up and fall away, leaving BB-sized holes behind. As the fungus spreads, more leaf tissue is damaged until the leaf falls. Significant infections can reduce the amount of photosynthesis that can occur, weakening the plant, and decreasing fruit production. The infection on the fruits in turn begins as small purple spots that develop into gray to white lesions. Gummosis may occur (both on the fruits and the stems as well). These lesions leave toughened spots on the skin, and in some cases the fruit may be lost. Infected buds may appear darker than normal. Branches may develop concentric lesions when infected. These lesions may girdle a twig and kill it.

== Disease cycle ==
W. carpophilus overwinters in infected buds and in twig cankers. Asexual spores (conidia) are dispersed in spring when moisture levels increase or as a result of overhead watering. Spores are pigmented and remain viable, in a dormant state, for months. Infection can occur any time moisture is present for at least 24 hours, as long as temperatures are above 36 °F (2 °C). At higher temperatures, infection occurs more quickly. W. carpophilus infection takes only 6 hours at 77 °F (25 °C).

== Management ==
W. carpophilus can remain viable for several months and spores are often airborne. Since the fungi thrive in wet conditions, overhead watering should be avoided. Remove and dispose of any infected buds, leaves, fruit and twigs. In fall, fixed copper or Bordeaux mixture can be applied.

== Importance ==
Shot hole disease is a major concern of the stone fruit industry. It is estimated that 80% of the California almond crop may be infested with shot hole disease, resulting in a potential yield loss of 50-75%. In the 1930s, it was found that applications of Bordeaux mixture reduces shot hole disease on peaches from 80% to 9%.
