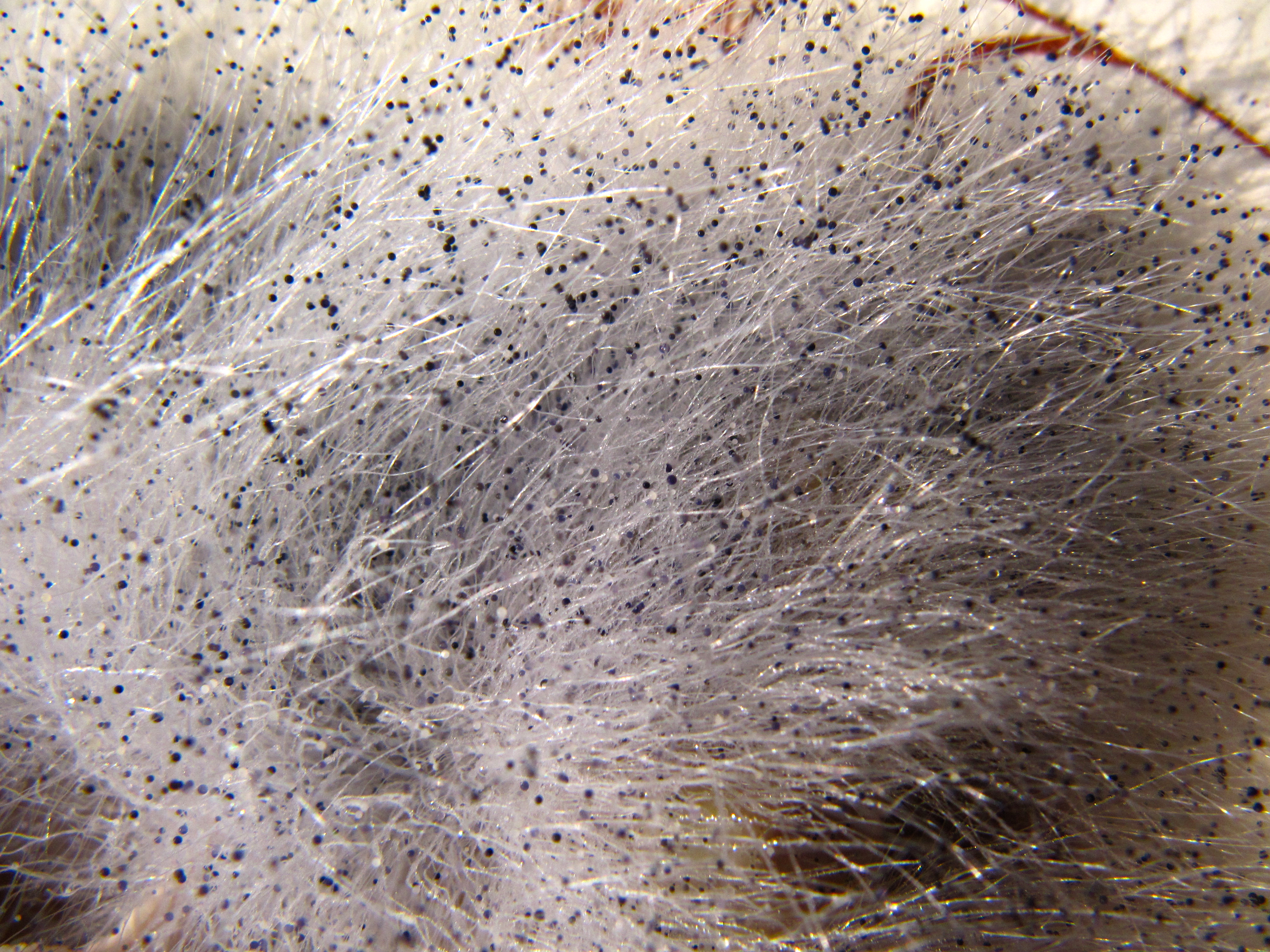
- Rhizopus stolonifer

Scientific classification
- Kingdom: Fungi
- Division: Mucoromycota
- Class: Mucoromycetes
- Order: Mucorales
- Family: Mucoraceae
- Genus: Rhizopus
- Species: R. stolonifer

Binomial name
- Rhizopus stolonifer Vuillemin (1902)

Synonyms
- Rhizopus nigricans Ehrenberg (1820); Mucor stolonifer Ehrenberg (1818); Rhizopus artocarpi var. luxurians Schroet (1886); Mucor niger Geodoelst (1902); Rhizopus niger Ciaglinski & Hewelke (1893)

= Rhizopus stolonifer =

Species of fungus

Rhizopus stolonifer, commonly known as black bread mold, is a member of Zygomycota and considered the most important species in the genus Rhizopus. It is one of the most common fungi in the world and has a global distribution, although it is most commonly found in tropical and subtropical regions. It is a common agent of decomposition of stored foods. Like other members of the genus Rhizopus, R. stolonifer grows rapidly, mostly in indoor environments.

== History ==
This fungus was first discovered by the German scientist Christian Gottfried Ehrenberg in 1818 as Rhizopus nigricans. The name was changed in 1902 to Rhizopus stolonifer by the French mycologist J. P. Vuillemin.

== Habitat and ecology ==
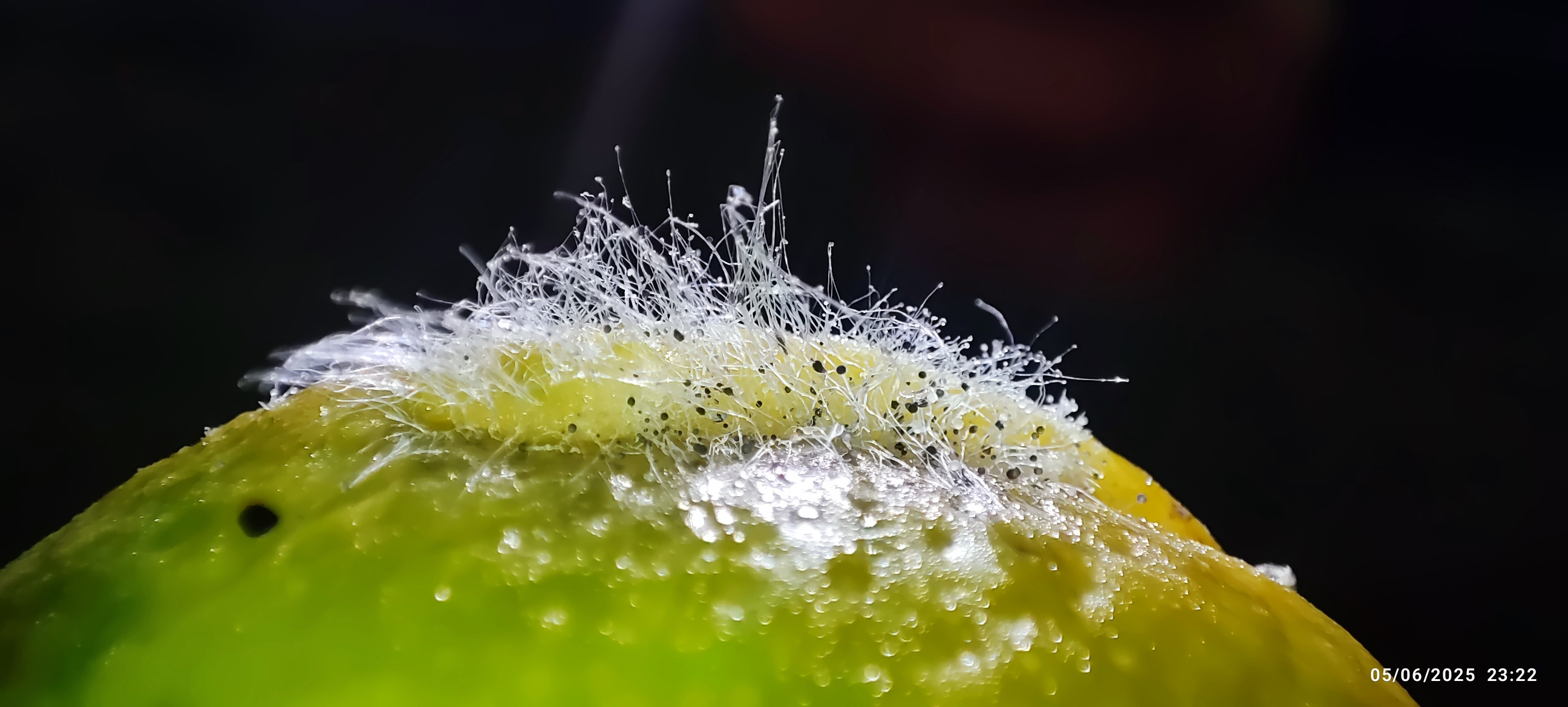
Fungal mold growing on the surface of a lemon

Rhizopus stolonifer has a cosmopolitan distribution and is found on all types of mouldy materials. It is often one of the first molds to appear on stale bread. It can exist in the soil as well as in the air. A variety of natural substrata are colonized by this species because R. stolonifer can tolerate broad variations in the concentration of essential nutrients and can use carbon and nitrogen combined in diverse forms.

In the laboratory, this fungus grows well on different media, including those that contain ammonium salts or amino compounds. However, R. stolonifer will not grow on Czapek's agar because it cannot utilize nitrogen in the form of nitrate. Rhizopus lives in hyphae and matured spores.

== Growth and physiology ==
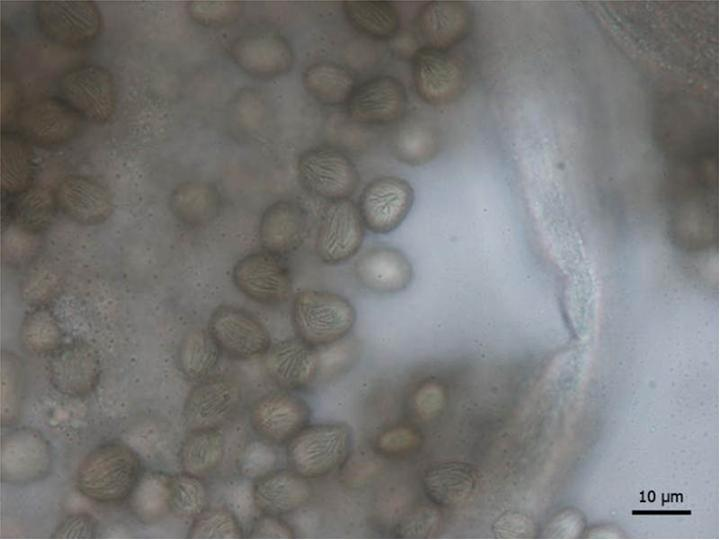
Gem-shaped sporangiospores of R. stolonifer showing characteristic striations.

This species is known as a saprotroph and plays an important role in the early colonization of substrata in soil. Nonetheless, it can also behave as a parasite of plant tissues causing a rot of vegetables and fruits. Like other species of Rhizopus, R. stolonifer grows rapidly and spreads by means of the stolons. The stolons provide an aerial structure for the growth of the mycelium and the occupation of large areas. They can climb vertically as well as horizontally. Rhizopus species periodically produce rhizoids, which anchor it to the substrate and unbranched aerial sporangiophores. Sporangiophores of R. stolonifer can be up to 2.5 mm long and about 20 μm in diameter. The spores are shaped differently depending on the available nutrients. They can be ovate, polygonal or angular. The optimal temperature for growth varies between 25 and 30 °C. The thermal death point, which is defined as the lowest temperature that can kill all cells in ten minutes, is 60 °C. Rhizopus stolonifer can grow in acidic environments with a pH of as low as 2.2. The pH range can vary from 2.2 to 9.6. Ultraviolet irradiation can delay spore germination.

== Reproduction ==
Rhizopus stolonifer can reproduce asexually and sexually. It is a heterothallic species. Sexual reproduction occurs when compatible haploid mating types in the form of hyphae make contact with each other, producing diploid zygospores. The sporangiophore contains both '+' and '−' mating type strains in the form of sporangiospores. Meiosis is delayed until the germination of the zygospores. The gametogenia often differ in size, regardless of mating type. This difference in size is not due to sex but presumably due to nutrition.

== Disease and prevention ==
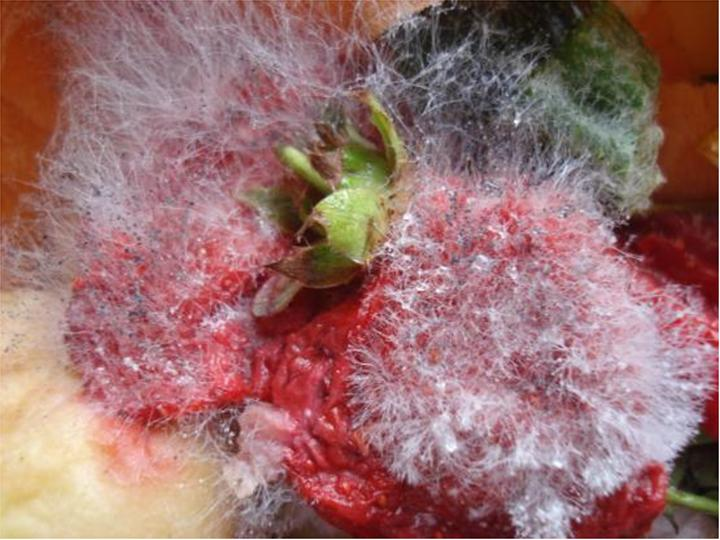
R. stolonifer colonizing a strawberry.

The disease caused by this fungus occurs mainly on ripe fruits, such as strawberries, melon and peach, which are more susceptible to wounds and have a higher sugar content. R. stolonifer can also cause soft rot of many vegetables, flowers, bulbs, corms, and seeds. After a couple of days, the infected fruits become soft and release juices with an acidic odour. When the humidity and temperature are favourable, the mycelial growth occurs rapidly at the surface of the infected fruit and the disease causes the development of long mycelial stolons with black sporangia and spores. When the fungus germinates, it produces different kinds of esterases, including cutinase, which help the fungus to penetrate the plant cell wall. Once spores germinate and puncture the cell wall, various enzymes are released to break down glucose, fructose, sucrose, and other sugars, producing fumaric acid, lactic acid, and ethanol. The disease can also affect other adjacent healthy fruits when distributed by wind or insect activity.

Some species of Syncephalis can reduce the asexual reproduction of R. stolonifer and therefore may delay or even prevent the post-harvest disease caused by this fungus. Fengycin, which is an anti-fungal complex, also induces the fungal cell death via necrosis and apoptosis. The treatment of sweet potatoes with sodium orthophenyl phenol (Stopmold B) and dichloran (Botran W) have effectively reduced storage rot.

In humans, Rhizopus stolonifer is an opportunistic agent of disease and hence will only cause infection in those with a weakened immunity. Zygomycosis is the main disease that might be caused by this fungus in humans and while it is not entirely understood yet, this disease is very dangerous and can be fatal. More commonly, Rhizopus stolonifer may cause respiratory infections, sinusitis, and otomycosis. The action of smelling spoiled food may be a source of inhalation exposure to the mold.

== Importance ==
Rhizopus stolonifer is important economically as an agent of post-harvest storage decay.

While Saccharomyces cerevisiae is the most important source of industrial alcohol, R. stolonifer and other species of Rhizopus also produce ethyl alcohol which is the most important fermentation product. Rhizopus stolonifer is also used commercially to manufacture fumaric acid and lactic acid of high purity. The presence of zinc reduces the amount of fumaric acid produced by the fungus.
