= List of Oomycetes of South Africa =

This is an alphabetical list of the oomycotal taxa recorded from South Africa.

== A ==
Family: Albuginaceae

Genus: Albugo

- Albugo austro-africana Syd.
- Albugo candida Kunze.
- Albugo candida f. heliophilae P.Henn.
- Albugo cubicus
- Albugo evansii Syd.
- Albugo tragopogonis (Pers.) Gray (1821),accepted as Pustula tragopogonis (Pers.) Thines 2005
- Albugo sp.

== P ==
Genus: Peronospora

- Peronospora destructor Casp.
- Peronospora effusa (Grev.) Rabenh. (1854)
- Peronospora euphorbiae Tuck.
- Peronospora mesembryanthemi Verw.
- Peronospora obovata Bon.
- Peronospora oxalidis Verw. & du Pless.
- Peronospora parasitica Tul. accepted as Hyaloperonospora parasitica (Pers.) Constant., 2002 (Oomycota)
- Peronospora rumicis Corda.
- Peronospora schleideni Ung.
- Peronospora trifoliorum de Bary.
- Peronospora viciae de Bary.

Family: Peronosporaceae

Order: Peronosporales

Genus: Pseudoperonospora

- Pseudoperonospora cubensis Berk. & Curt.

Family: Pythiaceae

Genus: Pythium

- Pythium acanthicum Drechsl.
- Pythium aphanidermatum Fitz.
- Pythium artotrogus
- Pythium debaryanum Hesse.
- Pythium debaryanum var. pelargonii Braun
- Pythium fabae Cheney.
- Pythium irregulare Buisman.
- Pythium myriotylum Drechsl.
- Pythium oligandrum Drechsl.
- Pythium spinosum Saw.
- Pythium splendens Braun.
- Pythium ultimum Trow.
- Pythium vexans de Bary (1876), accepted as Phytopythium vexans (de Bary) Abad, de Cock, Bala, Robideau, A.M.Lodhi & Lévesque (2014)
- Pythium sp.

== S ==
Genus: Saprolegnia

- Saprolegnia ferox Nees.

Family: Saprolegniaceae

Order: Saprolegniales
