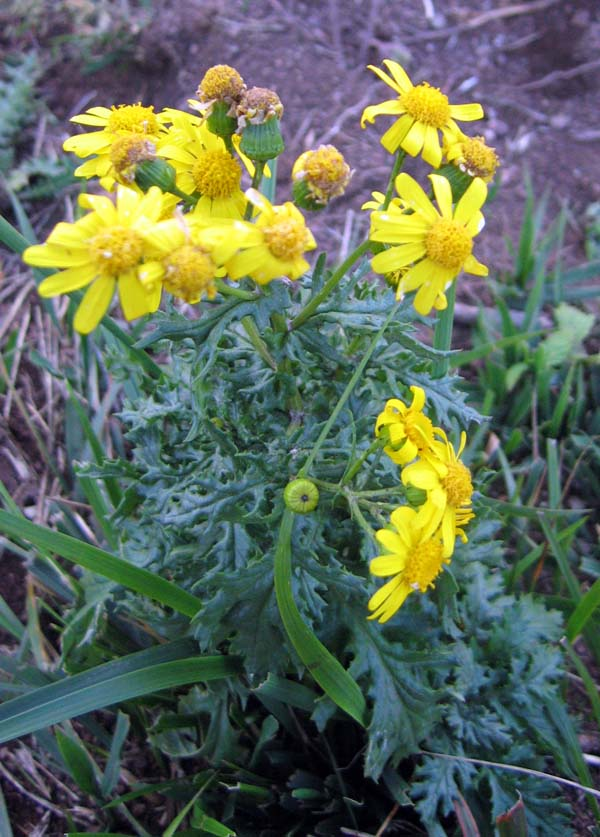

Scientific classification
- Kingdom: Plantae
- Clade: Tracheophytes
- Clade: Angiosperms
- Clade: Eudicots
- Clade: Asterids
- Order: Asterales
- Family: Asteraceae
- Genus: Senecio
- Species: S. squalidus

Binomial name
- Senecio squalidus L.
- Range of S. squalidus

Synonyms
- Senecio nebrodensis auct., non L. Senecio laciniatus Bertol. Senecio rupestris Waldst. & Kit. Senecio squalidus d'Urv. Senecio squalidus Willd. Senecio squalidus M.Bieb. Jacobaea incisa C. Presl; Senecio glaber Ucria; Senecio incisus (C. Presl) C. Presl

= Senecio squalidus =

Species of flowering plant in the daisy family

Senecio squalidus, known as Oxford ragwort, is a flowering plant in the daisy family Asteraceae. It is a yellow-flowered herbaceous plant, native to mountainous, rocky or volcanic areas, that has managed to find other homes on man-made and natural piles of rocks, war-ruined neighborhoods and dry-stone walls. These habitats resemble its well drained natural rocky homeland. The plants have spread via the wind, rail and the activities of botanists. The travels of this short-lived perennial, biennial, or winter annual make it a good subject for studies of the evolution and ecology of flowering plants.

== Description ==
Like all members of the family Asteraceae, Senecio squalidus has a composite flower head known as a capitulum. What look like single flowers are actually a cluster of florets, each petal or ligule being a flower, or floret, possessing its own stamen and capable of producing the specialized seed of the family Asteraceae, the parachute-like achene.

Oxford ragwort is a short-lived perennial, a biennial, or a winter annual and grows in a branched straggling form to between 1.5 feet (0.5 m) and 3.3 feet (1 m) depending on conditions. S. squalidus prefers dry, disturbed places, cultivated and waste ground, walls and railway banks. It flowers from March to December and reproduces from seed.

Leaves and stems
S. squalidus leaves are alternate, glossy, almost hairless and variable in form from deeply pinnately lobed to undivided with only the lower leaves being stalked. Stems and leaves resemble those of the common groundsel (Senecio vulgaris) with the exception that their lobes are more widely spaced.

Inflorescence
S. squalidus has larger capitula than Senecio jacobaea and a more spreading habit. Yellow capitula of 10-14 petals in loose clusters. They are pollinated by insects. Ray corollas 0.3 inches (8 mm) to 0.6 inches (15 mm) long, 0.08 inches (2 mm) to 0.16 inches (4 mm) wide.

Oxford ragwort is self-incompatible and needs pollen from other plants with different self-incompatibility alleles; its own flowers possess a stigma with characteristics of both the “dry” and “wet” types.

The fruiting heads are often nodding.

Seeds
Each pollinated Oxford ragwort floret matures into a bell to cylindrical shaped indehiscent achene, the shallowly ribbed fruit is light brown in colour and .06 inches (1.5 mm) to .12 inches (3 mm) long. Each plant can produce approximately 10,000 fruits during the year.

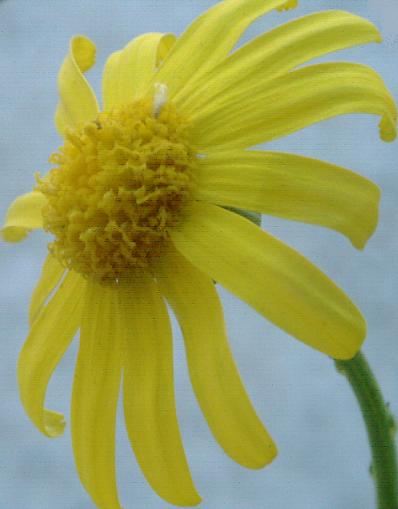
Mature capitulum

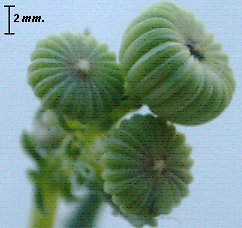
S. squalidus developing capitula

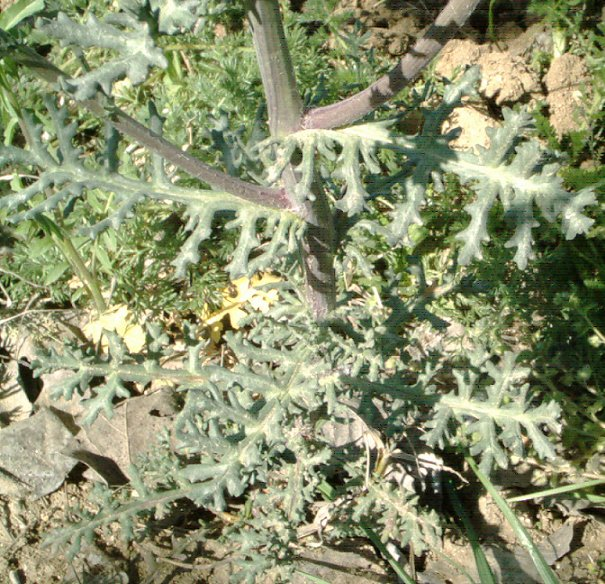
Leaves and stalks of S. squalidus

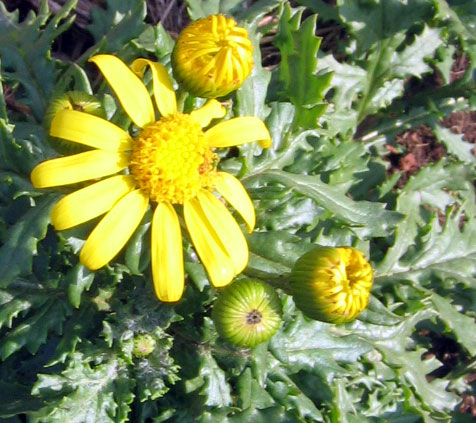
Capitula at different stages of development

As a Senecio and a diploid Senecio squalidus is part of a species group along with S. flavus, S. gallicus, S. glaucus and S. vernalis, which are widespread geographically and interesting for the study of genetic differences in relation to the environment and plant evolution.

== History ==
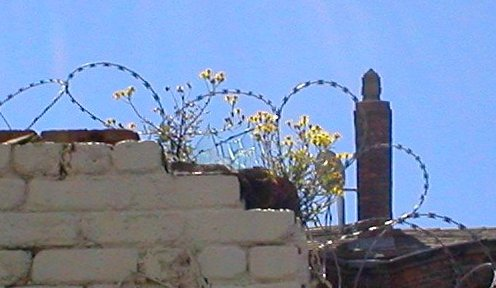
Senecio squalidus growing on walls in Liverpool

This Senecio was introduced into Britain via Francesco Cupani and William Sherard in the years of their visit 1700, 1701 and 1702 from Sicily where it lives as a native on volcanic ash to the Duchess of Beaufort's garden at Badminton House. Later a transfer of the plant material to the Oxford Botanic Garden by the "Horti Praefectus" Jacob Bobart the Younger took place before his death in 1719, providing perhaps a good indication of when this species of ragwort and other invasive species might have "escaped" and started to make their home in the greater British Isles. The Sicilian ragwort escaped into the wild and grew in the stonework of Oxford colleges (with the specific mention of the Bodleian Library) and many of the stone walls around the city of Oxford. This gave the plant its common name, "Oxford Ragwort".

Carl Linnaeus first described Senecio squalidus in 1753, although there is a dispute as to whether the material came from the Botanic Garden or from walls in the city; the taxonomy for this species is further complicated by the existence of species with a similar morphology in continental Europe.

James Edward Smith officially identified the escaped Oxford ragwort with its formal name Senecio squalidus in 1800.

The vortex of air following the express train carries the fruits in its wake. I have seen them enter a railway-carriage window near Oxford and remain suspended in the air in the compartment until they found an exit at Tilehurst.

— George Druce, 1927

During the Industrial Revolution, Oxford became connected to the railway system and the plant gained a new habitat in the railway lines clinker beds, gradually spreading via the railway to other parts of the country. The process was accelerated by the movement of the trains and the limestone ballast that provides a well-drained medium which is an adequate replica of the lava-soils of its native home in Sicily.

During the 20th century it continued to spread along railway lines and found a liking for waste places and bombed sites after World War II which have a lot in common with the volcanic regions of its home.

Recently, this and other Senecio species and their differing tastes for self-incompatibility and self-compatibility have been the subject of study for the purposes of understanding the evolution of plant species as the genus finds new homes and pollen partners throughout the world:

- The origin of Senecio vulgaris var. hibernicus Syme was determined to be an introgression of Senecio squalidus into Senecio vulgaris subsp vulgaris
- The dual origin of S. cambrensis Rosser to both Wales and Scotland explained as being a product parenting by the diploid S. squalidus and the tetraploid S. vulgaris in both locations
- The willingness of S. squalidus to hybridize with Senecio viscosus Crisp & Jones and forms the sterile hybrid S. subnebrodensis Simk.
- The suggestion that S. squalidus is actually a hybrid of two other Sicilian Senecio: S. aethnensis Jan ex DC and S. chrysanthemifolius Poir.

== Distribution ==
Senecio squalidus grows on scree in mountainous regions of native range, and earned its common name Oxford ragwort for its willingness and ability to grow in similar habitat elsewhere in the world.

Native range of S. squalidus.

Native

Senecio squalidus is considered to be a native of New Brunswick and Nova Scotia, Canada by the USDA Natural Resources Conservation Service while the same USDA other resource Germplasm Resources Information Network considers it to be native to Austria, Czech Republic, Slovakia, Germany, Switzerland, Albania, Bulgaria, Greece, Crete, Italy, Sardinia, Sicily, Romania, Bosnia and Herzegovina, Croatia, Montenegro, North Macedonia, Serbia, Slovenia.

Current

Africa

Northern Africa: Morocco

America

North America: New Brunswick, Nova Scotia, British Columbia, California

Europe

Northern Europe: Denmark, Germany, Republic of Ireland, Netherlands, Norway, Sweden, United Kingdom
Middle Europe: Austria, Czech Republic, Hungary, Slovakia, Switzerland
East Europe: Poland,
Southeastern Europe: Albania, Bosnia and Herzegovina, Bulgaria
Southwestern Europe: France, Spain
South Europe: Croatia, Crete, Greece, Italy, North Macedonia, Romania, Sardinia, Serbia, Sicily, Slovenia

Range Maps

North America

Africa

Europe

== Predators ==
S. squalidus is a food plant for some insects, for example:

Flies

Gall flies (Diptera: Tephritidae):
- Sphenella marginata
- Trupanea stellata
- Trypeta zoe

Fungi

Most Senecio, including S. squalidus, are susceptible to rust and other fungus and mildews:

Rust fungus Uredinales
- Coleosporium tussilaginis – (Coleosporiaceae)
- Puccinia lagenophorae – (Pucciniaceae)
White rust Peronosporales
- Albugo tragopogonis – (Albuginaceae)
Sac fungus Ascochyta, Pezizomycetes
- Ascochyta senecionicola – (Coelomycete)
Powdery Mildew Helotiales
- Golovinomyces fischeri – (Erysiphaceae)

== Synonyms and misapplied names ==
- Jacobaea incisa C. Presl
- Senecio glaber Ucria
- Senecio incisus (C. Presl) C. Presl
- Senecio laciniatus Bertol.
- Senecio nebrodensis auct., non L.
- Senecio rupestris Waldst. & Kit.
- Senecio squalidus d'Urv.
- Senecio squalidus Willd.
- Senecio squalidus M.Bieb.
- Senecio nebrodensis L. subsp. rupestris (Waldst. & Kit.) Fiori
- Senecio leucanthemifolius subsp. vernalis (Waldst. & Kit.) Greuter
- Senecio squalidus subsp. aethnensis (DC.) Greuter
- Senecio squalidus subsp. araneosus (Emb. & Maire) Alexander
- Senecio squalidus subsp. aurasicus (Batt.) Alexander
- Senecio squalidus subsp. aurasiacus (Batt. & Trab.) Alexander
- Senecio squalidus subsp. chrysanthemifolius (Poir.) Greuter
- Senecio squalidus subsp. eurasiacus (Batt. & Trab.) Alexander
- Senecio squalidus subsp. microglossus (Guss.) Arcang.
- Senecio squalidus subsp. rupestris (Waldst. & Kit.) Greuter
- Senecio squalidus subsp. sardous (Fiori) Greuter
- Senecio squalidus subsp. squalidus
- Senecio squalidus var. glaber (Ucria) FIORI

Misapplied names
- Senecio nebrodensis sec. Fiori, A
