= White rust =

White rust may refer to:

- Albugo candida, a type of plant pathogen known as "white rust"
- Albugo occidentalis, white rust of spinach
- Wilsoniana bliti, a type of plant pathogen known as "white rust"
- Wet storage stain, a type of corrosion on zinc products
- Puccinia horiana, causative agent of Chrysanthemum white rust, a plant disease
