= Heinrich Anton de Bary =

German surgeon, botanist, microbiologist and mycologist (1831–1888)

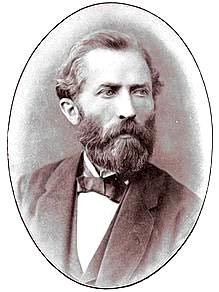
- Born: 26 January 1831; Frankfurt
- Died: 19 January 1888 (aged 56); Strasbourg, Germany (now France)
- Education: Frankfurt, Heidelberg, Marburg, Berlin
- Occupations: Surgeon; botanist; mycologist
- Known for: Demonstrating sexual life cycle of fungi; study of plant diseases; coining the term "symbiosis"
- Spouse: Antonie Einert
- Children: 4
- Scientific career
- Workplaces: University of Tübingen, University of Halle, University of Strasbourg,
- Thesis: De plantarum generatione sexuali
- Author abbrev. (botany): de Bary

Heinrich Anton de Bary (26 January 1831 – 19 January 1888) was a German surgeon, botanist, microbiologist, and mycologist. He is considered a founding father of plant pathology as well as the founder of modern mycology. His extensive and careful studies of the life history of fungi and contribution to the understanding of algae and higher plants established landmarks in biology.

== Early life and education ==
Born in Frankfurt to physician August Theodor de Bary (1802–1873) and Emilie Meyer de Bary, Anton de Bary was one of ten children. He joined excursions of naturalists who collected local specimens. De Bary’s interest was further inspired by George Fresenius, a physician, who also taught botany at Senckenberg Institute. Fresenius was an expert on thallophytes. In 1848, de Bary graduated from a gymnasium at Frankfurt, and began to study medicine at Heidelberg, continuing at Marburg. In 1850, he went to Berlin to continue pursuing his study of medicine, and also continued to explore and develop his interest in plant science. Although he received his degree in medicine, his dissertation at Berlin in 1853 was titled "De plantarum generatione sexuali", a botanical subject. He also published a book on fungi and the causes of rusts and smuts.

== Early career ==
After graduation, de Bary briefly practiced medicine in Frankfurt, but he was drawn back to botany and became Privatdozent in botany at the University of Tübingen, where he worked for a while as an assistant to Hugo von Mohl (1805–1872). In 1855, he succeeded the botanist Karl Wilhelm von Nägeli (1818–1891) at Freiburg, where he established the most advanced botanical laboratory at the time and directed many students.

== Later career and research ==
In 1867, de Bary moved to the University of Halle as successor to Professor Diederich Franz Leonhard von Schlechtendal, who, with Hugo von Mohl, co-founded the pioneer botanical journal Botanische Zeitung. De Bary became its coeditor and later sole editor. As an editor of and contributor to the journal, he exercised great influence upon the development of botany. Following the Franco-Prussian War (1870–1871), de Bary took the position of professor of botany at the University of Strasbourg, where he was the director of the Jardin botanique de l'Université de Strasbourg, and founder of its New Garden. He was also elected as the inaugural rector of the reorganized university. He conducted much research in the university botanical institute, attracted many international students, and made a large contribution to the development of botany.

His 1884 book Vergleichende Morphologie und Biologie der Pilze, Mycetozoen und Bakterien was translated into English as Comparative Morphology and Biology of the Fungi, Mycetozoa, and Bacteria (Clarendon Press, 1887).

=== Fungi and plant diseases ===
De Bary was devoted to the study of the life history of fungi. At that time, various fungi were still considered to arise via spontaneous generation. He proved that pathogenic fungi were like other plants, and not the products of secretions from sick cells.

In de Bary’s time, potato late blight had caused sweeping crop devastation and economic loss. The origin of such plant diseases was not known at that time. de Bary studied the pathogen Phytophthora infestans (formerly Peronospora infestans) and elucidated its life cycle. Miles Joseph Berkeley (1803–1889) had insisted in 1841 that the oomycete found in potato blight caused the disease. Similarly, de Bary asserted that rust and smut fungi caused the pathological changes that affected diseased plants. He concluded that Uredinales and Ustilaginales were parasites.

De Bary spent much time studying the morphology of fungi and noticed that certain forms that were classed as separate species were actually successive stages of development of the same organism. De Bary studied the developmental history of Myxomycetes (slime molds), and thought it was necessary to reclassify the lower animals. He first coined the term Mycetozoa to include lower animals and slime molds. In his work on Myxomycetes (1858), he pointed out that at one stage of their life cycle (the plasmodial stage), they were nearly-formless, motile masses of a substance that Félix Dujardin (1801–1860) had called sarcode (protoplasm). This is the fundamental basis of the protoplasmic theory of life.

De Bary was the first to demonstrate sexuality in fungi. In 1858, he had observed conjugation in the alga Spirogyra, and in 1861, he described sexual reproduction in the fungus Peronospora sp. He saw the importance of observing pathogens throughout their whole life cycle and attempted to follow that practice in his studies of living host plants.

==== Peronosporeae ====
De Bary published his first work on potato blight fungi in 1861, and then spent more than 15 years studying Peronosporeae, particularly Phytophthora infestans (formerly Peronospora infestans) and Cystopus (Albugo), parasites of potato. In his published work in 1863 entitled "Recherches sur le developpement de quelques champignons parasites", he reported inoculating healthy potato leaves with spores of P. infestans. He observed that mycelium penetrated the leaf and affected the tissue, forming conidia and the black spots characteristic of potato blight. He did similar experiments on tubers and potato stalks. He watched conidia in the soil and their infection of the tubers, observing that mycelium could survive the cold winter in the tubers. Based on these studies, he concluded that organisms were not being generated spontaneously.

==== Puccinia graminis ====
He did a thorough investigation on Puccinia graminis, the pathogen that produces rust in wheat, rye and other grains. He noticed that P. graminis produced reddish summer spores or "urediospores", and darker winter spores or "teleutospores". He inoculated the leaves of barberry (Berberis vulgaris) with sporidia from winter spores of wheat rust. The sporidia germinated, leading to the forming of aecia with yellow spores, the familiar symptoms of infection on the barberry. De Bary then inoculated aecidiospores on moisture-retaining slides and then transferred them to the leaves of seedling of rye plants. In time, he observed the reddish summer spores appearing in the leaves. Sporidia from winter spores germinated only on barberry. De Bary clearly demonstrated that P. graminis lived upon different hosts at different stages of its development. He called this phenomenon "heteroecism" in contrast to "autoecism", in which development takes place only in one host. De Bary’s discovery explained why the practice of eradicating barberry plants was important as a control for rust.

==== Lichen ====
De Bary also studied the formation of lichens which are the result of an association between a fungus and an alga. He traced their stages of growth and reproduction and showed how adaptations helped them to survive conditions of drought and winter. In 1879 he coined the word "symbiosis", meaning "the living together of unlike organisms", in the publication "Die Erscheinung der Symbiose" (Strasbourg, 1879). He carefully studied the morphology of molds, yeasts, and fungi and basically established mycology as an independent science.

== Influence ==
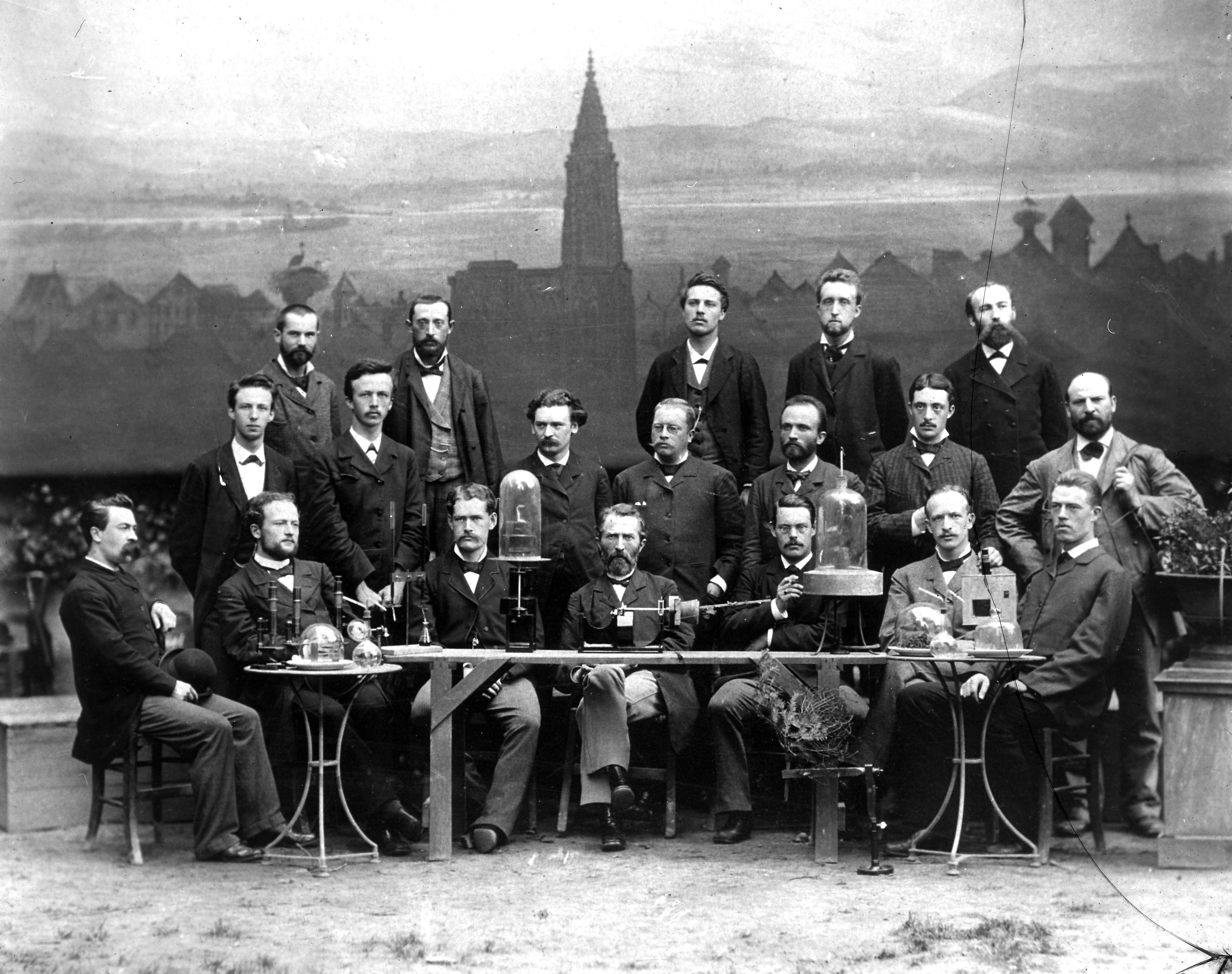
Anton de Bary (c. 1880) surrounded by students in a photo studio with a coulisse of the Strasbourg Cathedral in the backdrop.

De Bary's concept and methods had a great impact on the fields of bacteriology and botany, making him one of the most influential bioscientists of the 19th century. He published more than 100 research papers. Many of his students later became distinguished botanists and microbiologists including Sergei Winogradsky (1856–1953), William Gilson Farlow (1844–1919), and Pierre-Marie-Alexis Millardet (1838–1902).

== Personal life and death ==
De Bary came from a noble family of Huguenots from Wallonia, which was driven out from there by the Spanish Habsburgs under Emperor Charles V and can be found in Frankfurt since 1555. Anton's father and his brother Johann Jakob de Bary were respected doctors in Frankfurt. His mother was Caroline Emilie von Meyer (1805–1887), whose family produced two renowned scientists.

De Bary married Antonie Einert (21 January 1831, Leipzig – 22 May 1892, Thann, Alsace–Lorraine) in 1861; they raised four children: Wilhelm, August, Marie and Hermann. Antonie was a talented artist and painter, particularly of plants, who contributed to her husband's scientific work. He was elected to Honorary membership of the Manchester Literary and Philosophical Society on 9 February 1886 .

He died on 19 January 1888 in Strasbourg, of a tumor of the jaw, after undergoing extensive surgery.

== See also ==
- List of mycologists
- Wm. Theodore de Bary, American sinologist, a great-nephew

== Sources ==
- "Бари, Генрих-Антон" . Brockhaus and Efron Encyclopedic Dictionary (in Russian). 1906.
