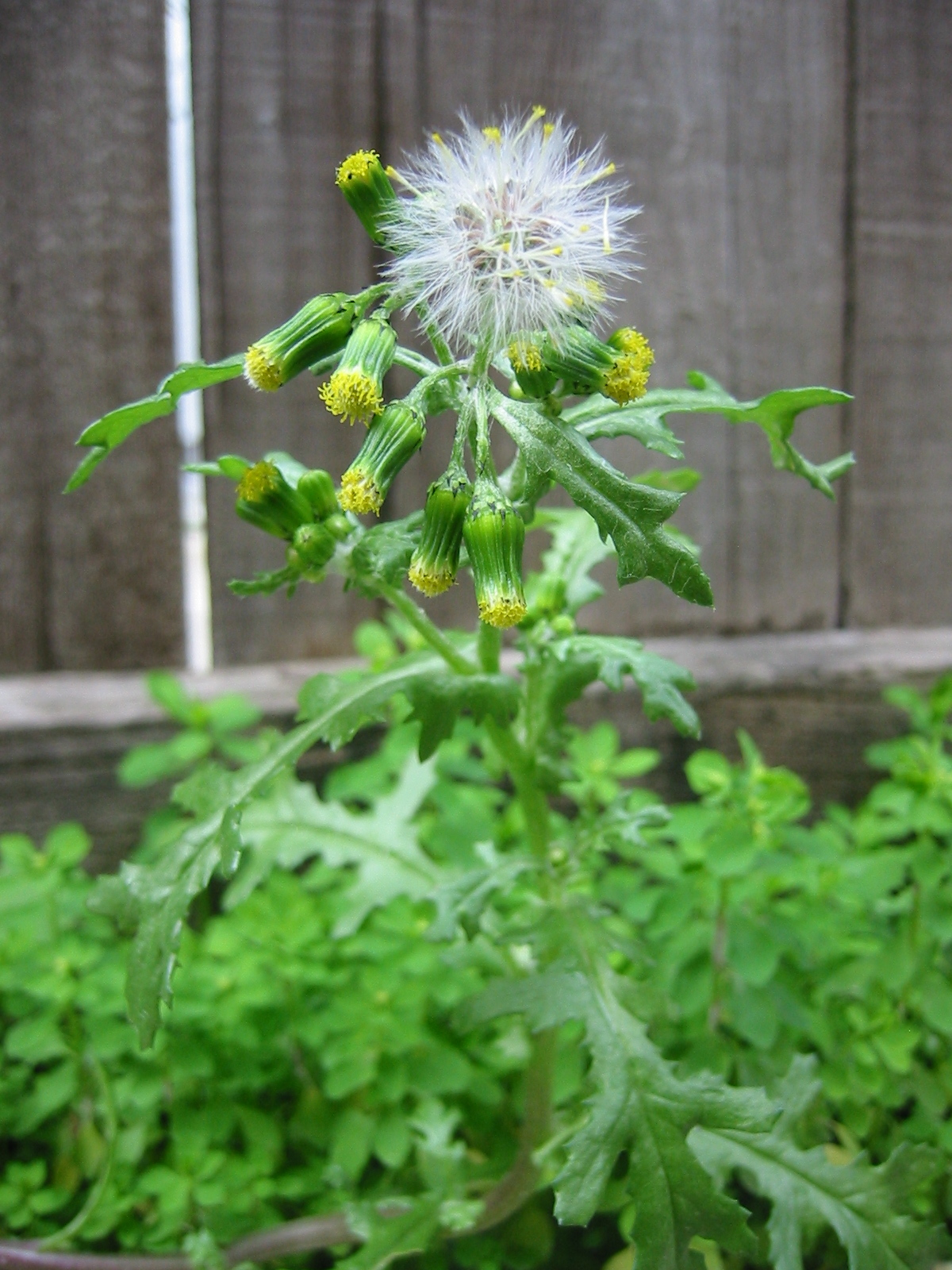

Scientific classification
- Kingdom: Plantae
- Clade: Tracheophytes
- Clade: Angiosperms
- Clade: Eudicots
- Clade: Asterids
- Order: Asterales
- Family: Asteraceae
- Genus: Senecio
- Species: S. vulgaris

Binomial name
- Senecio vulgaris L.
- Range of Senecio vulgaris

Synonyms
- Senecio dunensis Dumort.; Senecio radiatus W.D.J.Koch

= Senecio vulgaris =

Species of flowering plant in the daisy family

Senecio vulgaris, often known by the common names groundsel and old-man-in-the-spring, is a flowering plant in the family Asteraceae. It is an annual herb, native to the Palaearctic and widely naturalised as a ruderal species in suitable disturbed habitats worldwide.

== Description ==
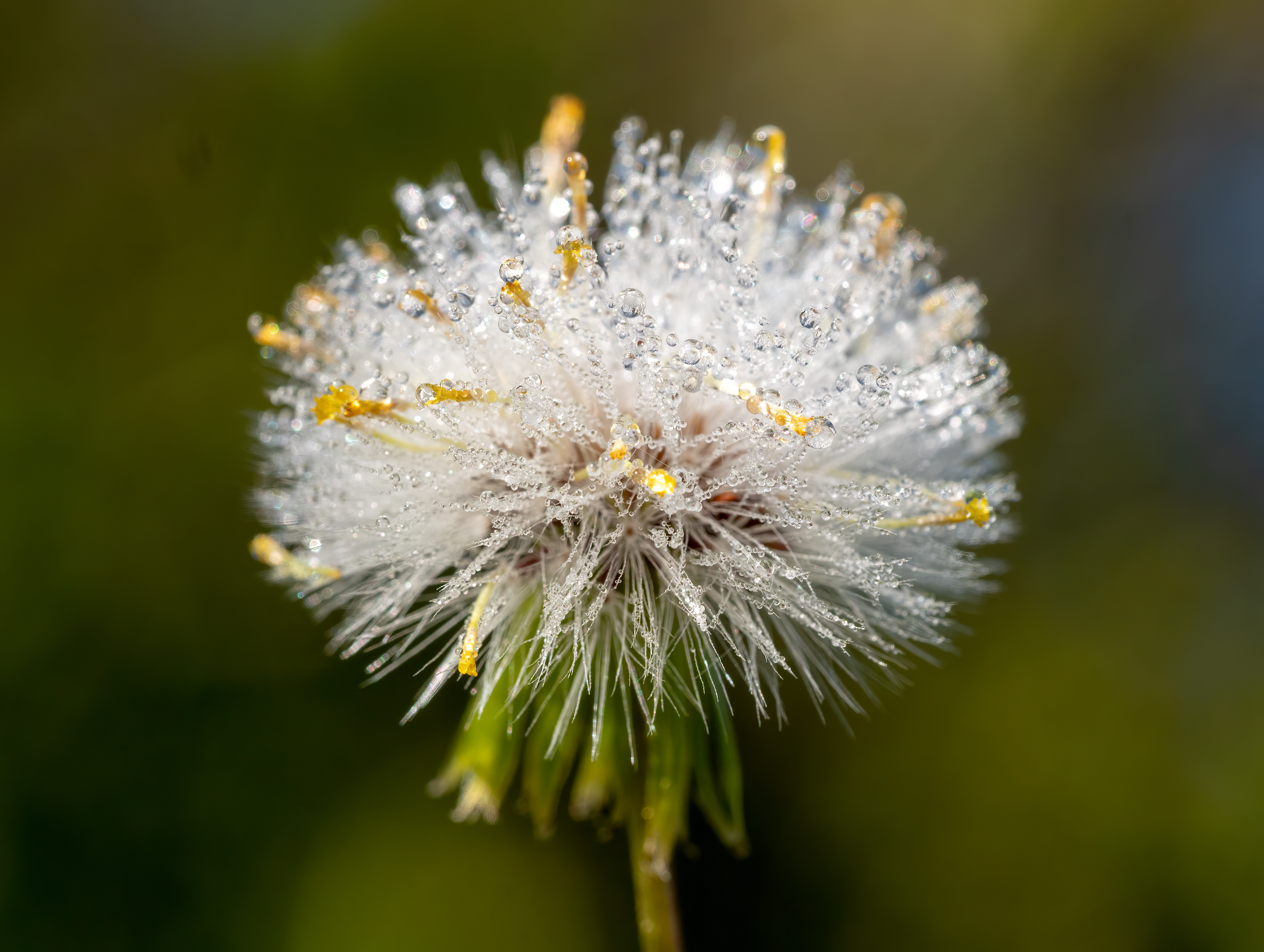
Dew-covered common groundsel flower in New Jersey

Senecio vulgaris is an erect, herbaceous annual growing up to 40 centimetres (16 in) tall. The inflorescences usually lack ray florets and the yellow disc florets are mostly hidden by the bracts, giving the flowers an inconspicuous appearance. S. vulgaris is very similar to Senecio viscosus, but S. vulgaris does not have the glandular hairs and ray florets found in S. viscosus.

=== Leaves and stems ===
Upper leaves of S. vulgaris are sessile, lacking their own stem (petiole), alternating in direction along the length of the plant, two rounded lobes are at the base of the stem (auriculate) and subclasping above. The leaves are pinnately lobed and about 60 mm (2.4 in) long and 25 mm (1 in) wide, smaller towards the top of the plant. They are sparsely covered with soft, smooth, fine hairs. The leaf lobes typically are sharp to rounded saw-toothed.

The hollow stems branch at the tops and from the base. Stems and leaves can both host the Cineraria leaf rust.

=== Flowers ===
Open clusters of 10 to 22 small, cylinder-shaped, rayless yellow flower heads 6.5 to 12.5 mm (1/4 to 1/2 in) with a highly conspicuous ring of black-tipped bracts are at the base of the inflorescence, as is characteristic of many members of the genus Senecio. A radiate form of S vulgaris is the result of cross-pollination with the closely related Oxford ragwort, Senecio squalidus.

=== Seeds ===
The seeds are achenes, include a pappus, and become sticky when wet. Laboratory tests have suggested maximum seed scattering distances of 3.8 and 4.2 m (4.2 and 4.6 yd) at wind speeds of 11 and 16.5 km/h (6.8 and 10.2 mph) respectively (affected by plant height), suggesting that more than wind spread these groundsel seeds throughout the world.

The average weight of 1000 seeds is 0.21 g (2,200,000 seeds per lb) and experienced a 100% germination success before drying and storage and an 87% germination success after drying and 3 years of cool, dry storage. In simple models for seed emergence prediction, soil thermal time did not predict the timing and extent of seedling emergence, as well as hydrothermal time (warm rain).

=== Roots ===
The root system consists of a shallow taproot. This plant spreads by reseeding itself.

Groundsel acts as a host for the fungus that causes black root rot in peas, alfalfa, soybeans, carrots, tomatoes, red clover, peanuts, cucurbits, cotton, citrus, chickpeas, and several ornamental flowering plants; a list of flowering plants that can host their own fungus, as well.

== Etymology ==
The specific epiteth vulgaris means "usual" or "common".

== Naming ==
Vernacular names for S. vulgaris in English include old-man-in-the-spring, common groundsel, groundsel, ragwort, grimsel, grinsel, grundsel, simson, birdseed, chickenweed, old-man-of-the-spring, squaw weed, grundy swallow, ground glutton, and common butterweed.

== Distribution ==
Senecio vulgaris is considered to be native to Europe, northern Asia, and parts of North Africa. Its further distribution is less clear. The United States Department of Agriculture (USDA), Natural Resources Conservation Service Plants Profile Database considers it to be native to all 50 of the United States of America, Canada, Greenland, Saint Pierre and Miquelon, the same USDA through the Germplasm Resources Information Network (GRIN) considers it to be native only to parts of Afro-Eurasia. The Integrated Taxonomic Information System Organization (ITIS), a partnership among many United States federal government departments and agencies states that the species has been introduced to the 50 United States, and the online journal Flora of North America calls it "probably introduced" to areas north of Mexico. Individual research groups claim it is not native to areas they oversee: Florida, Washington, Wisconsin, Saskatchewan, British Columbia, Missouri. The United States Geological Survey reports that common groundsel is exotic to all 50 states and all Canadian provinces with the exception of Georgia, Kentucky, Massachusetts, and Labrador.

== Ecology ==
Senecio vulgaris is a frost-resistant, deciduous, annual plant that grows in disturbed sites, waste places, roadsides, gardens, nurseries, orchards, vineyards, landscaped areas, and agricultural lands, at altitudes up to 500 m (1,600 ft), and is self-pollinating producing 1,700 seeds per plant with three generations per year. Seeds are dispersed by wind and also cling to clothing and animal fur, and as contaminates of commercially exchanged seeds; the distribution of this plant throughout the world has been difficult if not impossible to contain.

=== Herbivores ===
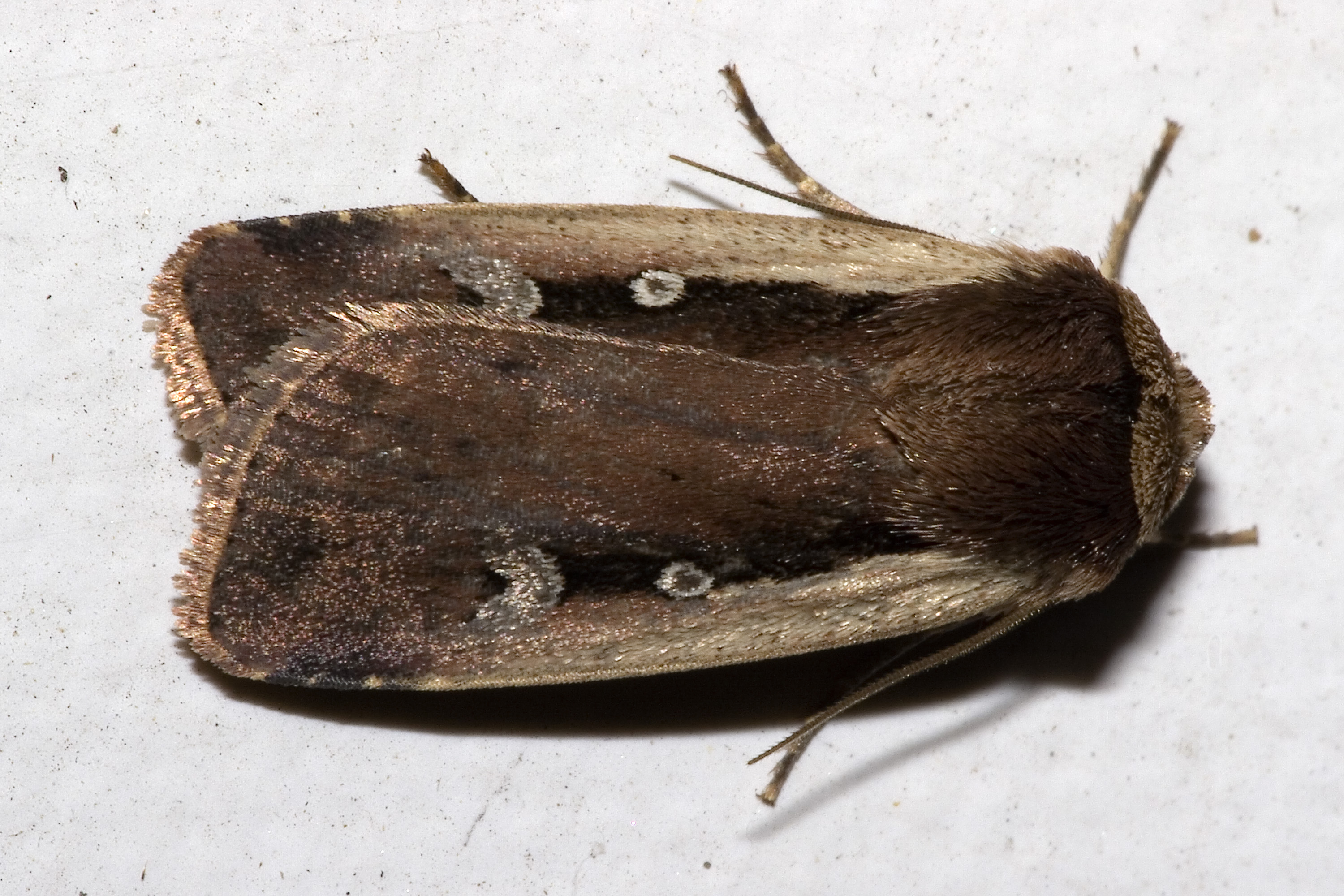
Flame shoulder moth or Ochropleura plecta

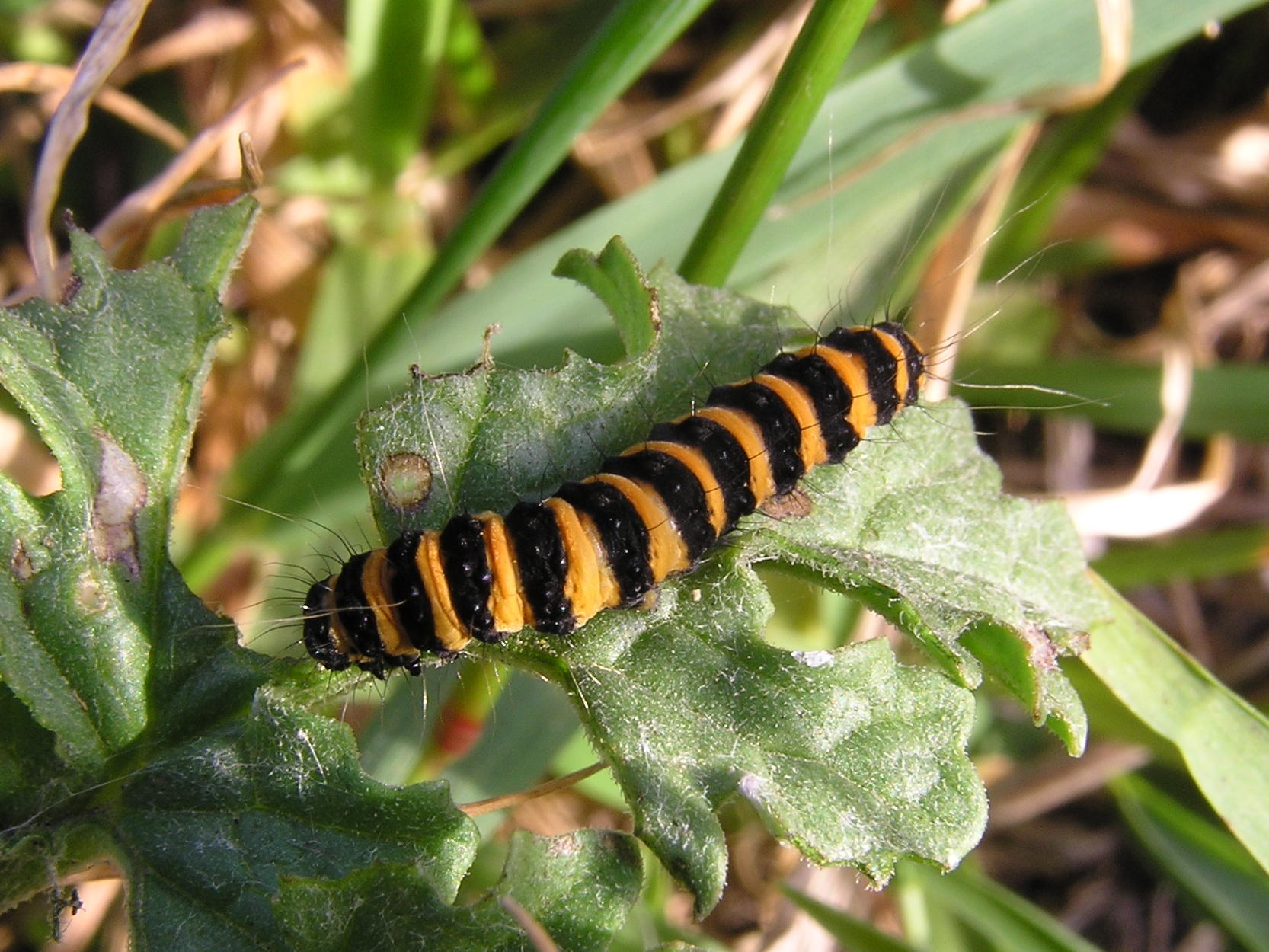
Cinnabar moth (Tyria jacobaeae) caterpillar feeding on a Senecio

The seed of common groundsel is a green food source for canaries and finches, and it is available all year round.

Senecio vulgaris seed has been found in the droppings of sparrows, and seedlings have been raised from the excreta of various birds. Seed has also been found in cow manure.

Some Lepidoptera eat many of the Senecio; additional studies via electrophysiological recordings have shown that the taste sensilla of the cinnabar moth larvae respond (get excited) specifically to the pyrrolizidine alkaloids, which all Senecio species contain.

Moths and caterpillars

- Cinnabar moth (Tyria jacobaeae)
- Flame shoulder (Ochropleura plecta)
- Ragwort plume moth (Platyptilia isodactyla)

Senecio species also are host to other insects:

Beetles

- Ragwort flea beetle (Longitarsus jacobaeae)
- Longitarsus gracilis (family Coleoptera species Chrysomelidae)

Flies

Seed flies (Diptera: Muscoidea)
- Ragwort seed fly (Anthomyiidae, Botanophila seneciella)
Gall flies (Diptera: Tephritidae):
- Ensina sonchi
- Sphenella marginata
- Trupanea stellata
- Trypeta zoe

and other insects that are not listed here.

The ragwort flea beetle and ragwort seed fly have been approved and released for Senecio control in California, Australia and elsewhere.

Fungi Most Senecio, including Senecio squalidus are susceptible to rust and other fungi and mildews:

Rust fungus Uredinales
- Coleosporium tussilaginis – stems and leaves (Coleosporiaceae)
- Puccinia lagenophorae – leaves only (Pucciniaceae)
- Bremia lactucae
White rust Peronosporales
- Albugo tragopogonis – (Albuginaceae)
- some of the species Peronosporaceae – (Albuginaceae)
Sac fungus Ascochyta, Pezizomycetes
- Ascochyta senecionicola – (Coelomycete)
Powdery mildew Helotiales
- Golovinomyces fischeri
Black root rot Microascales
- some of the family Incertae sedis

and other fungus that are not listed here.

== Toxicity ==
In the United States, Senecio vulgaris has been listed as a noxious weed, being both non-native to most if not all of the Americas and having a reputation for being hepatotoxic to livestock and to humans.

=== Toxic versus medicinal ===
Human

As a plant that is reported to be both poisonous for humans and also medicinal, much of the contradiction can be found by closely reviewing the words that are used and the dose (amount) of the poisonous substance that is ingested to prove either claim. All species of the genus Senecio contain pyrrolizidine alkaloids (e.g., senecionine), a substance that when a human has chronic exposure can cause irreversible liver damage.

Common groundsel as a medicinal herb does not seem to have been recommended very often since 1931, when it was recommended as a diaphoretic, an antiscorbutic, a purgative, a diuretic and an anthelmintic, which was a demotion as it was previously suggested for the expelling of gravel of the kidneys and reins by Pedanius Dioscorides in the 1st century, for use as poultices by John Gerard in the late 16th century and as a cure for epilepsy by Nicholas Culpeper in the 17th century. More current information is contradictory about the dangers of the ingestion of groundsel. A heavily referenced paper from 1989 suggests that the response is immediate and gives pre-ambulatory care recommendations. A Canadian poisonous plants information database references a paper from 1990 in presenting this prenatal warning: "In a case of prenatal exposure, a mother ingested tea containing an estimated 0.343 milligram of senecionine, resulting in fatal veno-occlusive disease in a newborn infant." Information about the pyrrolizidine alkaloids, the substance present in S. vulgaris is much less contradictory and all warn of accumulation of the alkaloid.

Certain pyrrolizidine alkaloids are non-toxic precursors that are converted to toxic metabolites in the body in a process called toxification

Botanist and noted authority on plant lore Albert Roy Vickery quotes a 1991 account of the use of groundsel as a highly effective purge in the English county of Dorset:

Mr Joby House, who used to be at Hewood, told us that, for constipation, you boiled groundsel and lard and take that and you will shit through the eye of a needle. His sister Lucy had constipation so bad that when the doctor called in the morning he said Lucy would be dead by 5 o'clock. Mrs. House went to the gypsies (Mrs. Penfold)...and she told her how to cure her. The doctor came late in the day, and Lucy was running around; there was shit everywhere. The doctor had brought Lucy's death certificate, but he was so mad he tore it up and put it in the fire.

Livestock

Carl Linnaeus is cited to have claimed that "goats and swine eat this common plant freely, cows being not partial to it and horses and sheep declining to touch it, but not only are caged birds fond of it (the seeds), but its leaves and seeds afford food for many of our wild species (rabbits were given as an example)." More recent studies claim that the lethal amount that cattle or horses need to consume is 7% of their body weight (example: 25 kg or 50 lb would need to be consumed by a cow weighing 320 kg or 700 lb). Lesser amounts cause the liver to lose function but is not apparent until the animal is stressed (by new feed or location, pregnancy, a different toxin, etc.). Sheep and goats have rumen bacteria that detoxify the alkaloids and are able to consume twice their body weight of this and other species of genus Senecio. The alkaloids responsible are not destroyed by drying or by fermentation in silage.

=== Introduced versus invasive ===
Introduced species become invasive when they compete with natives or with crops. Senecio vulgaris is not known to be a strong competitor but it has been known to reduce mint production. There is evidence that it is not a strong invasive and sometimes protective of critically endangered native plants.

The approximately 22-millimetre (0.87 in) long pappus seeds of Senecio vulgaris, each plant capable of producing 25,000 or more seeds (1,700 seeds per plant are more likely) with three generations of the plant per year; seeds that are widely dispersed by the wind, have been identified as a contaminant of cereal and vegetable seeds and a poison to some livestock; there is some inspiration to understand the growth stages and determine some control methods.

Cultivation

Cultivation with the hand or tiller is a recommended method of controlling Senecio vulgaris from growing in gardens and planting fields; cultivate to a depth of 50 mm (2 in). The plant does prefer to take root in disturbed soils, so cultivation rids new plants but also buries and stirs up new seeds so the cultivation needs to be repeated at 14-day intervals. Seeds can still mature even when the plant has been killed; seed from plants cut in flower had germination levels of 35%. Groundsel seed numbers increased in soil during a two-year set-aside left fallow but not when there was a sown grass cover. The weed cannot live on grazed, trampled or mowed sites.

Biological

The pathogen rust fungus or Puccinia lagenophorae and the cinnabar moth (Tyria jacobaeae) have both been used and studied in an attempt to control infestation of Senecio vulgaris. One study showed that rust fungus infected Senecio vulgaris survived and actually used more of the available soil nutrients. The cinnabar moth eats groundsel between June and August, but the seeds germinate and the plant grows as soon as the ground is warm enough (and after a warm rain), making this an insufficient control almost everywhere groundsel can be found.

Chemical

Herbicides designed to control broadleaf plants are effective for controlling Senecio vulgaris in cereals and forage grasses but also will "control" broadleaf crops, such as mint, forage legumes, strawberries, carrots and all other non-grass crops. There is also evidence that the plant develops an immunity to the chemical control.

Other

Groundsel seedlings with 2–6 leaves are tolerant of flame weeding but the seeds are susceptible to soil solarization.

== See also ==
- Jacobaea vulgaris
- Cichorieae, a tribe also in the family Asteraceae with similar looking genera (Agoseris, Leontodon, Sonchus, etc.)
- Cineraria, a genus also in the tribe Senecioneae with similar looking species
