= Jama Nigus =

Village in Ethiopia

- Village
- Location with in Ethiopia
- Coordinates: 10°49′10″N 39°40′54.1″E
- Country: Ethiopia
- Region: Amhara
- Zone: South Wollo Zone
- District: Albuko
- Elevation: 2,580 m (8,460 ft)
- Time zone: GMT+3

Jama Nigus (in Amharic: ጀማንጉስ ) is a village located in Albukko district, South Wollo, Ethiopia, fifteen miles south of Kombolcha.

The Mosque in Jama Nigus was first founded by the militant scholar Shaykh Muhammad Shafi b. Asqari Muhammad in the last quarter of eighteenth century as a traditional Islamic education and Sufi-center.
