= CFAP206 =

Protein-coding gene in humans

Identifiers
- Aliases: CFAP206, dJ382I10.1, C6orf165, Chromosome 6 open reading frame 165, cilia and flagella associated protein 206
- External IDs: MGI: 1916579; GeneCards: CFAP206

Gene location (Human)
Chr.	Chromosome 6 (human)
Band	6q15	Start	87,407,972 bp
Band	6q15	End	87,464,465 bp

Gene location (Mouse)
Chr.	Chromosome 4 (mouse)
Band	4|4 A5	Start	34,688,559 bp
Band	4|4 A5	End	34,730,206 bp
RNA expression pattern
Bgee	Human / Mouse (ortholog); Top expressed in: right uterine tube; left testis; olfactory zone of nasal mucosa; right testis; gonad; testicle; hypothalamus; ventricular zone; endometrium; anterior pituitary / Top expressed in: spermatid; spermatocyte; seminiferous tubule; otolith organ; utricle; upper respiratory tract; respiratory epithelium; nasal epithelium; olfactory epithelium; semen; More reference expression data
BioGPS	n/a
Gene ontology
Molecular function	protein binding
Cellular component	motile cilium; A axonemal microtubule; radial spoke; cytoplasm; cytoskeleton; cilium; cell projection
Biological process	axoneme assembly; cilium movement; cell projection organization
Sources:Amigo / QuickGO
Orthologs
Databases	NCBI: entry; OMA: entry
Species	Human	Mouse
Entrez	154313	69329
Ensembl	ENSG00000272514	ENSMUSG00000028294
UniProt	Q8IYR0	Q6PE87
RefSeq (mRNA)	NM_178823; NM_001031743	NM_027041; NM_001347062
RefSeq (protein)	NP_001026913	NP_001333991; NP_081317
Location (UCSC)	Chr 6: 87.41 – 87.46 Mb	Chr 4: 34.69 – 34.73 Mb
PubMed search
- Wikidata
View/Edit Human	View/Edit Mouse

Cilia And Flagella Associated Protein 206 (CFAP206) is a gene that in humans encodes a protein “DUF3508”. This protein has a function that is not currently very well understood. Other known aliases are “dJ382I10.1, UPF0704 Protein C6orf165.” In humans, the gene coding sequence is 56,501 base pairs long, with an mRNA of 2,215 base pairs, and a protein sequence of 622 amino acids. The C6orf165 gene is conserved in chimpanzee, rhesus monkey, dog, cow, mouse, rat, chicken, zebrafish, mosquito, frog, and more C6orf165 is rarely expressed in humans, with relatively high expression in brain, lungs (trachea) and testis. The molecular weight of UPF0704 is 71,193 Da and the PI is 6.38

== Gene Locus ==
The CFAP206 gene is located at Chromosome 6 from 88119558 to 88173965(6q15). It contains 12 exons. The genomic DNA is 54,407 base pairs long, while the longest mRNA that it produces is 2,215 bp long.

== Homology and Evolution ==
=== Orthologs ===
This protein is well conserved through a series of distantly related organisms including mammals, birds, amphibians, tunicates, bony fish, lancelets, insects, and sea urchins. The list of organisms in which orthologs have been found is shown below.

scientific name	common name	divergence from human lineage (MYA)	accession number	sequence length (aa)	sequence identity to human protein
Homo sapiens	Human	0	622	100%	
Macaca mulatta	Rhesus macaque	92.3	XP_001089007.2	658	98%
Rattus norvegicus	Brown rat	92.3	NP_001073169.1	622	81%
Felis catus	Cat	94.2	XP_003986405.2	629	85%
Chrysochloris asiatica	Cape golden mole	98.7	XP_006870694.1	622	85%
Elephantulus edwardii	Cape elephant shrew	98.7	XP_006902101.1	608	79%
Anolis carolinensis	Arboreal lizard	296	XP_003215583.1	621	70%
Gallus gallus	Chicken	296	XP_004940450.1	621	58%
Xenopus (Silurana) tropicalis	Western clawed frog	371.2	XP_002938343.1	635	65%
Danio rerio	Zebrafish	400.1	NP_991180	624	55%
Branchiostoma floridae	Lancelet	713.2	XP_002603798.1	626	63%
Oikopleura dioica	Oikopleura dioica	722.5	CBY12373.1	631	44%
Ciona intestinalis	Sea squirt	722.5	XP_002128218.1	624	60%
Helobdella	Leech	725.5	ESO10267.1	620	37%
Aedes aegypti	Mosquito	725.5	630	30%	
Crassostrea gigas	Japanese oyster	782.7	EKC36332.1	624	61%
Anopheles gambiae	Str. PEST	782.7	642	28%	
Albugo laibachii	Oomycetes	1317.5	642	26.8%	

=== Paralogs ===
C6orf165 has no paralog.

=== Phylogeny ===
The rooted phylogeny tree is shown below

== Protein ==
The protein that is produced by the C6orf165 gene is termed DUF3508 and is 622 amino acids long. The protein has a predicated molecular weight of 71.20 kDa and isoelectric point of 6.38.

=== Domains ===
The C6orf165 gene protein product contains a well conserved domain DUF3508 This presumed domain is functionally uncharacterized. This domain is found in eukaryotes. This domain is about 280 amino acids in length.

=== Motifs ===
This domain has two conserved sequence motifs: GFC and GLL.

=== Post-translational modifications ===
The only predicted post-translational modification this protein undergo is phosphorylation after trying all tools under post translational modification category on expasy.org. Three phosphorylation site is predicted with score over 0.8. Phosphorylation on Ser 176, Thr 232 and Ser 310 are notified on the conceptual translation.

=== Secondary structure ===
The consensus of the prediction software PELE predicts that protein UPF0704 is dominated by alpha helices with interspersed regions of random coil.

PSORT II analysis[20] predicts that there is a coiled_coil_region from 88 to 117 with sequence MNYTNRVEFLEEHHRVLESRLGSVTREITD.

=== Location ===
PSORT II analysis trained on yeast data predicts that the subcellular location of this protein is most likely in the cytoplasm (56%). Less likely possibilities are in the mitochondria (21%) or in the nucleus (17%) or in vacuoles (4%).

== Gene expression ==
=== Gene expression data ===
From the EST file of Unigene, the gene expression in human is not strong, the gene EST/EST in pool is really low, even low than 0.01%. These little expression is in brain, connective tissue, kidney, lungs, parathyroid, pharynx, placenta, testis and trachea. In mouse, the gene expression of C6orf165 is even lower, the gene is only expressed in two body parts, ovary and testis. In chicken, the weak expressions are in two body part, brain and testis. In zebra fish, gene expression is still low, the very weak expressions are in eye, kidney and reproductive system. In sea squirt, the expressions are in gonad, heart and neural complex. In summary, c6orf165 is expressed conservatively in testis across the species and partially conservatively in brain or neural complex.

=== Promoter ===
The promoter region for human c6orf165 is identified by ElDorado (at Genomatix). In addition to this, the start codon is at the second exon of the mRNA and this indicate the first exon is spliced during the modification.

=== Transcript variants ===
In humans, the c6orf165 gene produces 4 different transcripts, 2 of which form a protein product (one undergoes nonsense mediated decay ang the other is retained intron). The main transcript in humans is transcript ID ENST00000369562, or C6ORF165-001; it has 13 exons and 12 coding exons; the translation length is 622 residues The second protein coding transcript in human is transcript ID ENST00000480123 or C6ORF165-002;it contains 7 exons and only 6 exons are protein coding; the translation length is 252 residues

== Interactions ==
Two-hybrid experiments revealed interacting proteins such as Myogenic repressor I-mf. This repressor is highly expressed in sclerotome. It inhibits the transactivation activity of the MyoD family and represses myogenesis. Protein complex co-immunoprecipitation (Co-IP) experiments revealed interacting protein NRF1 nuclear respiratory factor 1 This gene encodes a protein that homodimerizes and functions as a transcription factor which activates the expression of some key metabolic genes regulating cellular growth and nuclear genes required for respiration, heme biosynthesis, and mitochondrial DNA transcription and replication. Two-hybrid experiments revealed interacting protein RNF138 (ring finger protein 138), an E3 ubiquitin protein ligase. Affinity Capture-Western reveal an interaction protein called TP73 tumor protein p73, which is a protein related to the p53 tumor protein.

== Clinical significance ==
C6orf165 has no currently known disease associations or mutations.
