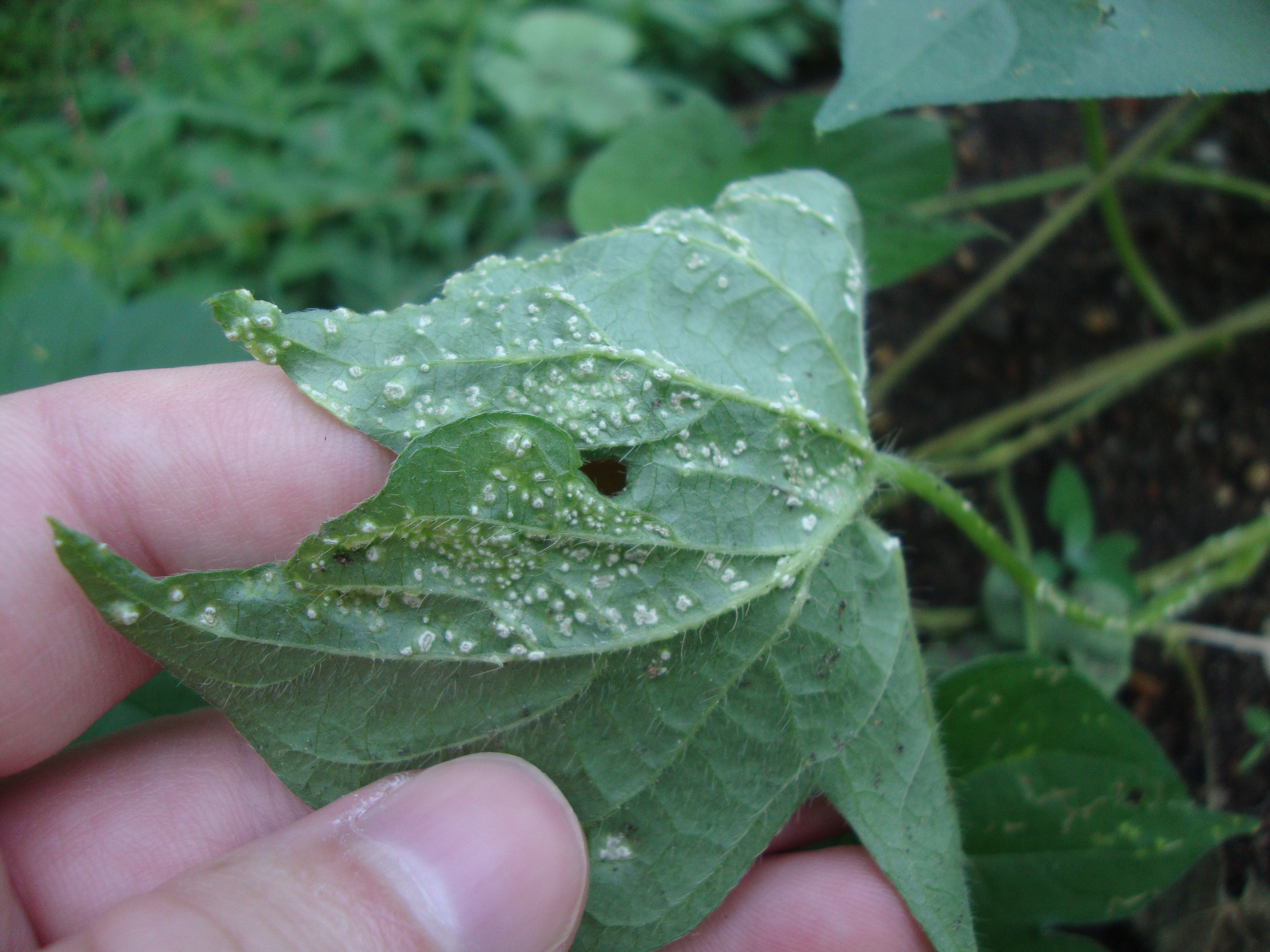
- White Albugo ipomoeae-pandurate pustules on the underside of a morning glory leaf.

Scientific classification
- Domain: Eukaryota
- Clade: Sar
- Clade: Stramenopiles
- Phylum: Oomycota
- Class: Peronosporomycetes
- Order: Albuginales
- Family: Albuginaceae
- Genus: Albugo
- Species: A. ipomoeae-panduratae

Binomial name
- Albugo ipomoeae-panduratae (Schwein.) Swingle, (1892)

Synonyms
- Aecidium ipomoeae Thüm., (1875); Aecidium ipomoeae-panduratae Schwein., (1822); Cystopus ipomoeae-panduratae (Schwein.) Stev.{?} & Swingle, (1889); Puccinia ipomoeae-panduratae (Schwein.) P. Syd. & Syd., (1904); Trochodium ipomoeae (Thüm.) Syd. & P. Syd., (1920); Uromyces ipomoeae (Thüm.) Berk., (1882)

= Albugo ipomoeae-panduratae =

Species of single-celled organism

Albugo ipomoeae-panduratae, or white rust, is an oomycete plant pathogen, although many discussions still treat it as a fungal organism. It causes leaf and stem lesions on various Ipomoea species, including cultivated morning glories and their relatives.
