= Pustula =

Pustula is the genus name of:

- Pustula (brachiopod), an extinct genus of brachiopods.
- Pustula (protist), a genus of Oomycetes.
