= Wilsoniana bliti =

Scientific classification
- Domain: Eukaryota
- Clade: Sar
- Clade: Stramenopiles
- Phylum: Oomycota
- Class: Peronosporomycetes
- Order: Albuginales
- Family: Albuginaceae
- Genus: Wilsoniana
- Species: W. bliti

Binomial name
- Wilsoniana bliti (Biv.) Thines 2005

Species of single-celled organism

Wilsoniana bliti, the white rust, is a type of oomycete pathogen of genus Wilsoniana that affects the tissues of plants. In particular, this white rust is found on Amaranth, beets and lambs quarters. Many discussions of this white rust treat it as a type of fungus.
