= Albugo laibachii =

Scientific classification
- Domain: Eukaryota
- Clade: Sar
- Clade: Stramenopiles
- Division: Oomycota
- Class: Peronosporomycetes
- Order: Albuginales
- Family: Albuginaceae
- Genus: Albugo
- Species: A. laibachii

Binomial name
- Albugo laibachii Thines & Y.J.Choi

Species of single-celled organism

Albugo laibachii is a species of oomycete. It is a plant pathogen of Arabidopsis thaliana. Albugo laibachii also causes the host plant to become more susceptible to other parasites, when it normally would be more resistant, wearing down the host plant's immune system. The Albugo laibachii genome was sequenced in 2011.

== See also ==
- Albugo (genus)
- Albugo comparative genomics
