= Phytopythium vexans =

Scientific classification
- Domain: Eukaryota
- Clade: Sar
- Clade: Stramenopiles
- Phylum: Oomycota
- Class: Peronosporomycetes
- Order: Peronosporales
- Family: Pythiaceae
- Genus: Phytopythium
- Species: P. vexans

Binomial name
- Phytopythium vexans (de Bary) Abad, de Cock, Bala, Robideau, A.M.Lodhi & Lévesque

Synonyms
- Ovatisporangium vexans (de Bary) Uzuhashi, Tojo & Kakish.; Pythium allantocladon Sideris; Pythium complectens Hans Braun; Pythium piperinum Dastur; Pythium vexans de Bary; Pythium vexans subsp. vexans; Pythium vexans var. minutum G.S.Mer & Khulbe

Species of single-celled organism

Phytopythium vexans (previously named Pythium vexans) is a plant pathogen infecting citruses. P. vexans was identified as an intermediate between Phytophthora and Pythium species, being more closely related to Phytophthora.
