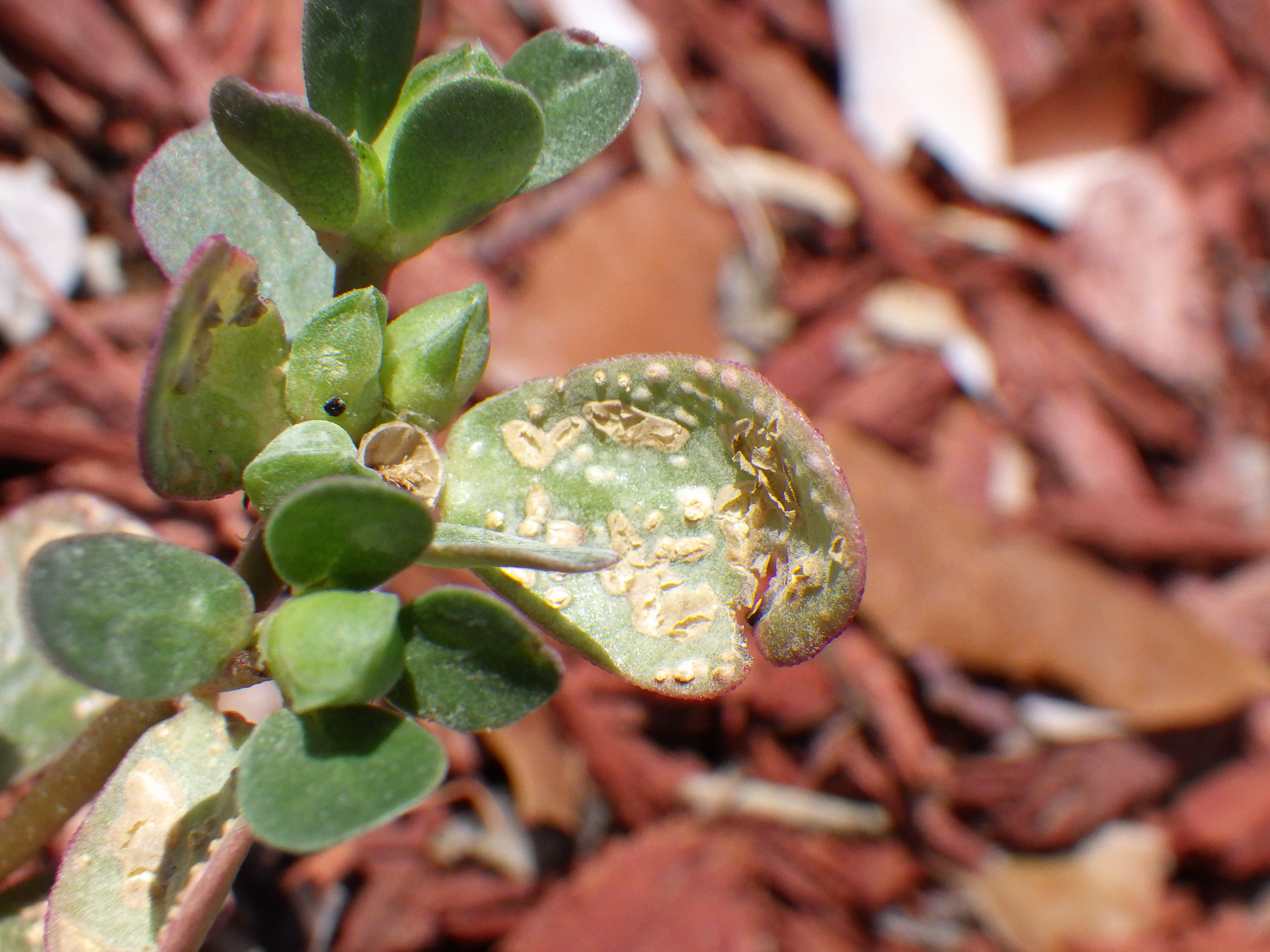
- W. portulacae on Portulaca oleracea

Scientific classification
- Domain: Eukaryota
- Clade: Diaphoretickes
- Clade: SAR
- Clade: Stramenopiles
- Phylum: Oomycota
- Order: Albuginales
- Family: Albuginaceae
- Genus: Wilsoniana; Thines

Type species
- Wilsoniana portulacae (DC. ex Duby) Thines Drechsler (1935)

= Wilsoniana =

Genus of plant pathogen

Wilsoniana is a genus of plant-parasitic oomycetes segregated from Albugo. The name is in honor of the American mycologist G.W.Wilson
