= Albugo occidentalis =

Scientific classification
- Domain: Eukaryota
- Clade: Sar
- Clade: Stramenopiles
- Division: Oomycota
- Class: Peronosporomycetes
- Order: Albuginales
- Family: Albuginaceae
- Genus: Albugo
- Species: A. occidentalis

Binomial name
- Albugo occidentalis G.W. Wilson, (1907)

Synonyms
- Cystopus occidentalis (G.W. Wilson) Sacc. & Trotter, (1912)

Species of single-celled organism

Albugo occidentalis, the causal agent of spinach white rust, is an oomycete plant pathogen, although some discussions still treat it as a fungal organism. Albugo occidentalis is one of the most important spinach diseases in North America, found throughout the United States east of the rocky mountains.

== Hosts and symptoms ==
The economically important host of Albugo occidentalis is spinach (Spinacia oleracea); although the oomycete has also been reported to affect plants of the genus Chenopodium, the genus including the crop plant quinoa. This pathogen causes white rust or white blister of spinach. It is unrelated to the basidiomycete rusts biologically, but appears somewhat similar on the surface of the leaf, sometimes causing the plant to form white or yellow blister-like pustules on leaves. The early stage, a milder chlorosis, is found on the on abaxial face, but if the white rust is allowed to thrive, it can blister and be visible on the adaxial surface as well.

== Disease cycle ==
Like all the other species in its genus, Albugo occidentalis is an oomycete. The survival structure is an oospore, which is the result of the karyogamy of two haploid gametes (the oogonium and antheridium). The oospore can overwinter in the soil, and in the spring it produces zoospores which will encyst on the surface of spinach leaves in the presence of water and germinate. Asexual propagation of Albugo occidentalis occurs via the production of sporangia on sporangiophores. These sporangia disperse and form zoospores, which complete the asexual cycle by re-infecting or infecting a new spinach leaf. The asexual oomycete can overwinter in spinach debris.

== Environment ==
Because it is an oomycete, presence of water or atmospheric moisture is essential for infection via motile zoospores. Periods of greatest risk of infection include spring and fall when cool evenings promote dew formation on leaf and days are not hot and dry enough to dry out the leaf surface. Albugo occidentalis is most successful at temperatures between 12° and 18 °C, and in this range the white rust takes about three days to germinate. It takes longer at temperatures outside of this window.
