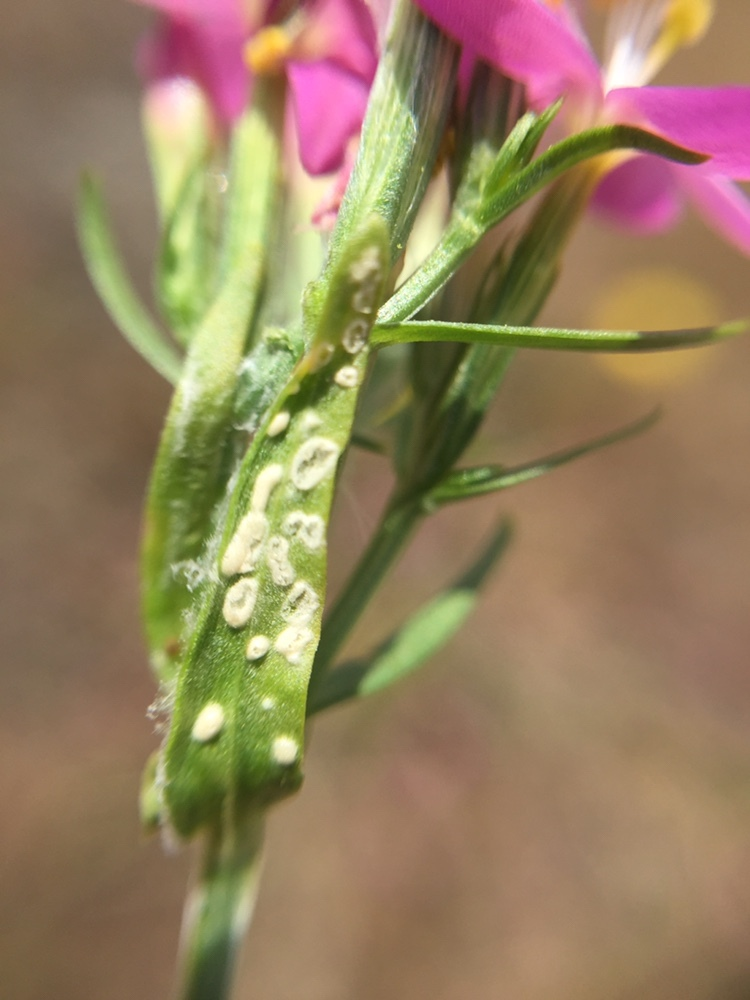
- Pustula centaurii

Scientific classification
- Domain: Eukaryota
- Clade: Diaphoretickes
- Clade: SAR
- Clade: Stramenopiles
- Phylum: Oomycota
- Order: Albuginales
- Family: Albuginaceae
- Genus: Pustula; Thines

Type species
- Pustula chardiniae (Bremer & Petr.) Thines Drechsler (1935)

= Pustula (protist) =

Genus of plant pathogen

Pustula is a genus of plant-parasitic oomycetes segregated from Albugo. The name is derived from Latin's pustula meaning "blister".
