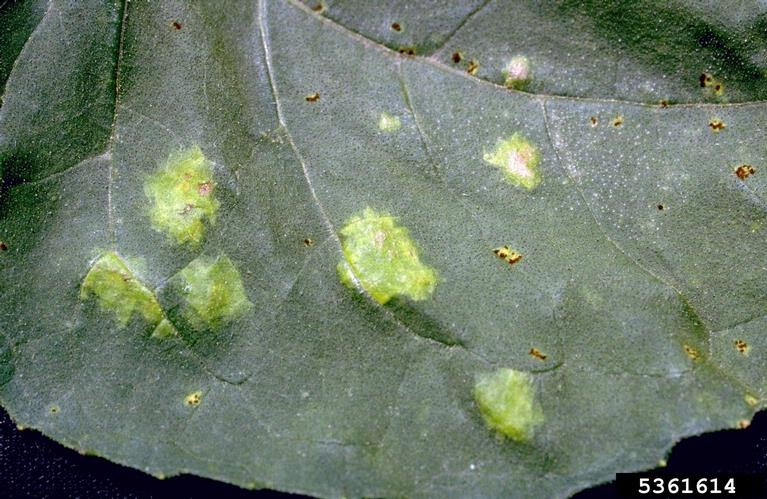
- A sunflower leaf with white rust infection caused by Pustula tragopogonis.

Scientific classification
- Domain: Eukaryota
- Clade: Sar
- Clade: Stramenopiles
- Division: Oomycota
- Class: Peronosporomycetes
- Order: Albuginales
- Family: Albuginaceae
- Genus: Pustula
- Species: P. tragopogonis

Binomial name
- Pustula tragopogonis (Pers.) Thines 2005

= Pustula tragopogonis =

Species of plant pathogen

Pustula tragopogonis, the goatsbeard white rust, is an oomycete plant pathogen unrelated to fungal organisms.

Albugo tragopogonis is the old name for Pustula tragopogonis, the causal agent of white blister disease on goatsbeard (Tragopogon spp.).
