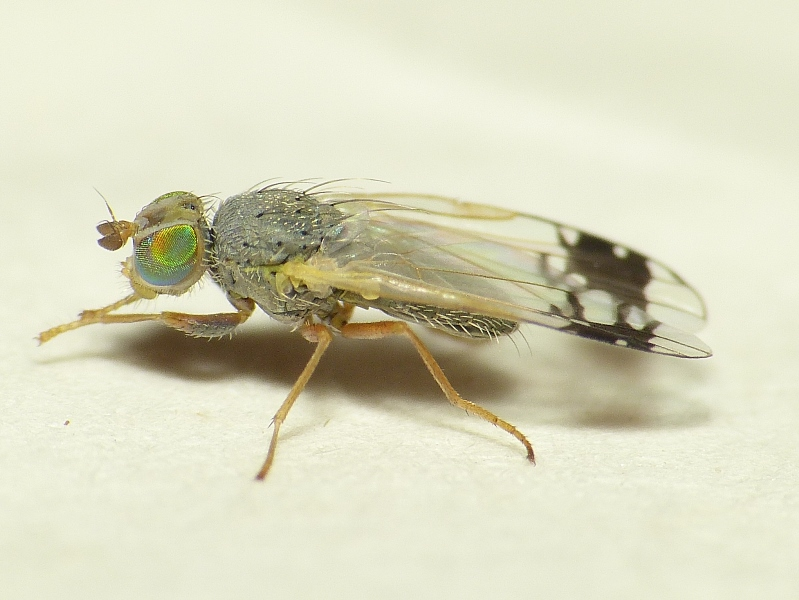

Scientific classification
- Kingdom: Animalia
- Phylum: Arthropoda
- Clade: Pancrustacea
- Class: Insecta
- Order: Diptera
- Family: Tephritidae
- Subfamily: Tephritinae
- Tribe: Tephritini
- Genus: Trupanea
- Species: T. stellata

Binomial name
- Trupanea stellata (Fuesslin, 1775)

Synonyms
- Musca stellata Fuesslin, 1775; Musca stellata Roemer, 1789; Musca radiata Walckenaer, 1802; Tephritis terminata Fallén, 1814; Tephritis terminata Fallén, 1820; Trupanea radiata Schrank, 1795; Urellia calcitrapae Robineau-Desvoidy, 1830

= Trupanea stellata =

Species of fly

Trupanea stellata is a species of tephritid or fruit flies in the genus Trupanea of the family Tephritidae.

== Distribution ==
United Kingdom, & Scandinavia East to Mongolia, South to North Africa, Middle East, Iran & India.
