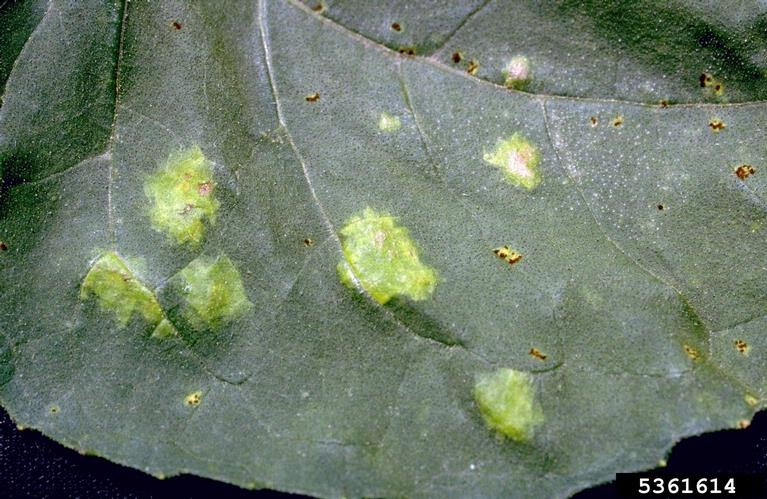
- A sunflower leaf with white rust infection caused by Pustula helianthicola

Scientific classification
- Domain: Eukaryota
- Clade: Sar
- Clade: Stramenopiles
- Phylum: Oomycota
- Class: Peronosporomycetes
- Order: Albuginales; Thines
- Family: Albuginaceae; J. Schröt.

Genera
- Albugo; Pustula; Wilsoniana

= Albuginaceae =

Family of single-celled organisms

Albuginaceae is a family of oomycetes.

== Genera and species ==
Albuginaceae contains the following subtaxa:

- Albugo
  - Albugo achyranthis
  - Albugo aechmantherae
  - Albugo arenosa
  - Albugo austroafricana
  - Albugo candida
  - Albugo capparis
  - Albugo chardoni
  - Albugo caldothricis
  - Albugo cynoglossi
  - Albugo eomeconis
  - Albugo eurotiae
  - Albugo evansii
  - Albugo evolvuli
  - Albugo froelichiae
  - Albugo gomphrenae
  - Albugo hesleri
  - Albugo hohenheimia
  - Albugo hyoscyami
  - Albugo ipomoeae-aquaticae
  - Albugo ipomoeae-hardwickii
  - Albugo ipomoeae-panduratae
  - Albugo keeneri
  - Albugo koreana
  - Albugo laibachii
  - Albugo leimonios
  - Albugo lepidii
  - Albugo lepigoni
  - Albugo macalpineana
  - Albugo mangenotii
  - Albugo mauginii
  - Albugo mesembryanthemi
  - Albugo minor
  - Albugo molluginis
  - Albugo occidentalis
  - Albugo pes-tigridis
  - Albugo pileae
  - Albugo polygoni
  - Albugo portulacearum
  - Albugo pratapi
  - Albugo pulverulentus
  - Albugo quadrata
  - Albugo resedae
  - Albugo rorippae
  - Albugo sibirica
  - Albugo solivae
  - Albugo solivarum
  - Albugo thlaspeos
  - Albugo tillaeae
  - Albugo trianthemae
  - Albugo tropica
  - Albugo voglmayrii
  - Albugo wasabiae
- Pustula
  - Pustula brasiliensis
  - Pustula cancriniae
  - Pustula centaurii
  - Pustula chardiniae
  - Pustula helianthicola
  - Pustula hydrocotyles
  - Pustula junggarensis
  - Pustula spinulosa
  - Pustula tragopogonis
  - Pustula xinyuanensis
- Wilsoniana
  - Wilsoniana achyranthis
  - Wilsoniana amaranthi
  - Wilsoniana bliti
  - Wilsoniana platensis
  - Wilsoniana portulacae
