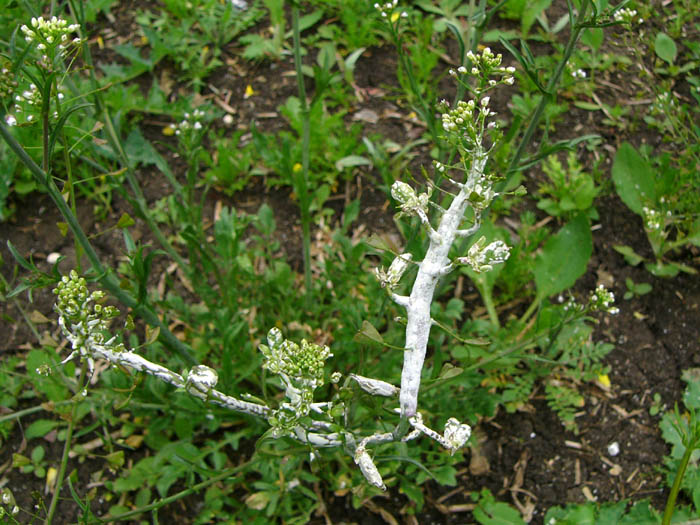
- On Shepherd's purse

Scientific classification
- Domain: Eukaryota
- Supergroup: Stramenopiles
- Division: Oomycota
- Class: Peronosporomycetes
- Order: Albuginales
- Family: Albuginaceae
- Genus: Albugo
- Species: A. candida

Binomial name
- Albugo candida (Pers.) Kuntze

Synonyms
- Aecidium candidum Pers. (1797); Albugo cruciferarum (DC.) Gray (1821); Cystopus candidus (Pers.) Lév. (1847); Uredo candida (Pers.) Fr., (1832); Uredo cruciferarum DC.

= Albugo candida =

Species of single-celled organism

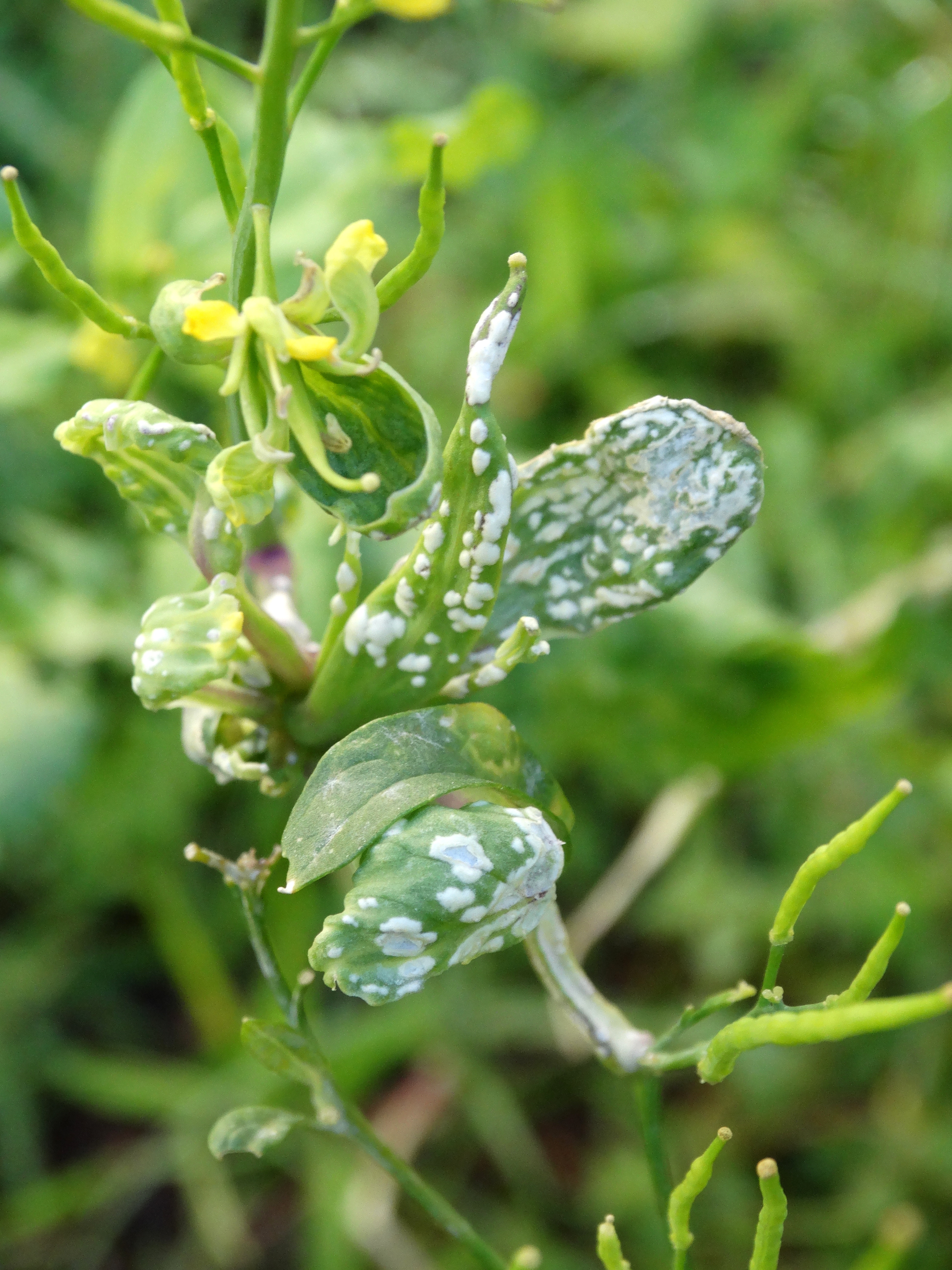
On a mustard leaf

Albugo candida, commonly known as white rust or white blister rust, is an obligate plant pathogen in the family Albuginaceae that infects Brassicaceae species. (Although called a "rust" and a fungus, it is an oomycete.) It has a relatively smaller genome than other oomycetes.

== Distribution ==
Albugo candida has a cosmopolitan distribution and is known from many countries where cruciferous crops are grown in Europe, Asia, Africa, Australasia, North, Central, and South America. It has not been recorded from northern Scandinavia, northern and central Siberia, northern China, western and central Africa, Alaska, northern and central Canada, and southern and western South America.

== Hosts ==
This pathogen infects plants in the family Brassicaceae; the growth stages involved include the seedling stage, the growing stage, the flowering stage, and the fruiting stage. It has been recorded on almost all the varieties and species of the rapeseed-mustard group of crops as well as many wild brassicas. It has also been recorded on plants in the families Aizoaceae, Capparaceae, Cleomaceae, and Amaranthaceae. There are many different races and varieties of A. candida, each infecting its own group of species; for example, one infects Capsella, Arabis, and Lepidium, while another infects Brassica, Diplotaxis, and Sinapis. Certain races of A. candida can colonise the model plant species, Arabidopsis thaliana.

== Symptoms ==
White rust can infect plants both locally and systemically. On stems, leaves, and inflorescences it appears as a mass of white or cream-coloured pustules, each about 2 mm (0.08 in) in diameter, packed with sporangia. New pustules are borne in radial fashion, while older pustules coalesce to form a bigger pustules in the center. The systemic version causes distortion, abnormal growth forms, and sterile inflorescences. The abnormal growth forms are sometimes known as "stagheads". Infection with white rust predisposes a crop to develop downy mildew, caused by another oomycete plant pathogen Phytophthora nicotianae.

== Life-cycle ==
When liberated, the sporangia inside the pustules are spread by wind, rain, and insects. After landing on a susceptible plant, each sporangium gives rise to about six zoospores which, under suitable conditions of moisture and light, form germ tubes which invade the plant's tissues. Zoospores are naked (wall-less), kidney-shaped and bi-flagellate. Both flagella are inserted laterally. Thick-walled sexual spores, called oospores are produced which germinate, producing either vesicles inside the plant tissue, exit tubes with vesicles at the tip, or germ tubes. Further zoospores develop inside the vesicles. The infection is spread by either oospore-infected seed or by mechanical movement of sporangia.

== Genome ==
Several projects have produced draft assemblies of A. candida. The most recent one, using Pacific Biosciences sequencing technology, produced a genome assembly of 38.96 megabases, with 13,073 predicted genes. Amongst 1104 secreted proteins, 110 proteins belong to a class of effectors called "CCGs".
