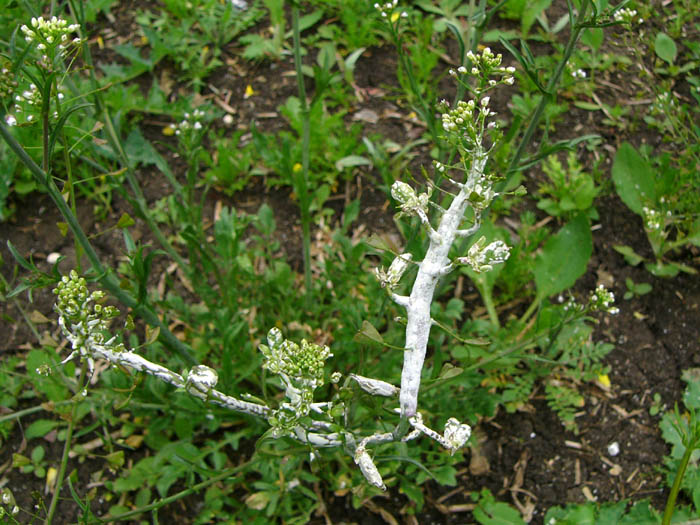
- Albugo candida, on Capsella bursa-pastoris

Scientific classification
- Domain: Eukaryota
- Clade: Sar
- Clade: Stramenopiles
- Phylum: Oomycota
- Class: Peronosporomycetes
- Order: Albuginales
- Family: Albuginaceae
- Genus: Albugo

Species
- Albugo candida; Albugo capparidis; Albugo capparis; Albugo caryophyllacearum; Albugo chardoni; Albugo evolvuli; Albugo gomphrenae; Albugo hesleri; Albugo hohenheimia; Albugo ipomoeae-panduratae; Albugo laibachii; Albugo leimonios; Albugo lepidii; Albugo lepigoni; Albugo mauginii; Albugo occidentalis; Albugo resedae; Albugo rorippae; Albugo trianthemae; Albugo tropica

= Albugo =

Genus of plant-parasitic oomycetes

Albugo is a genus of plant-parasitic oomycetes. Those are not true fungi (Eumycota), although many discussions of this organism still treat it as a fungus. The taxonomy of this genus is incomplete, but several species are plant pathogens. Albugo is one of three genera currently described in the family Albuginaceae, the taxonomy of many species is still in flux.

This organism causes white rust or white blister diseases in above-ground plant tissues. While these organisms affect many types of plants, the destructive aspect of infection is limited to a few agricultural crops, including: beets (garden and sugar), Brussels sprouts, cabbages, Chinese cabbage, cauliflower, collards, garden cress, kale, lettuce, mustards, parsnip, radish, horseradish, rapeseed, salsify (black or white), spinach, sweet potatoes, turnips, watercress, and perhaps water-spinach.

== Summary ==
White rust plant diseases caused by Albugo fungal-like pathogens should not be confused with white pine blister rust, Chrysanthemum white rust or any fungal rusts, all of which are also plant diseases but have completely different symptoms and causal pathogens. Symptoms of white rust caused by Albugo typically include yellow lesions on the upper leaf surface and white pustules on the underside of the leaf. The pathogen is spread by wind, water, and insects. Management includes use of resistant cultivars, proper irrigation practices, crop rotation, sanitation, and chemical control. White rust is an important economic disease, causing severe crop losses if not controlled.

== Hosts and symptoms ==
White rust pathogens create chlorotic (yellowed) lesions and sometimes galls on the upper leaf surface and there are corresponding white blister-like dispersal pustules of sporangia on the underside of the leaf. Species of the Albuginaceae deform the branches and flower parts of many host species. Host species include most if not all plants in the family Brassicaceae, common agricultural weeds, and those specified below.

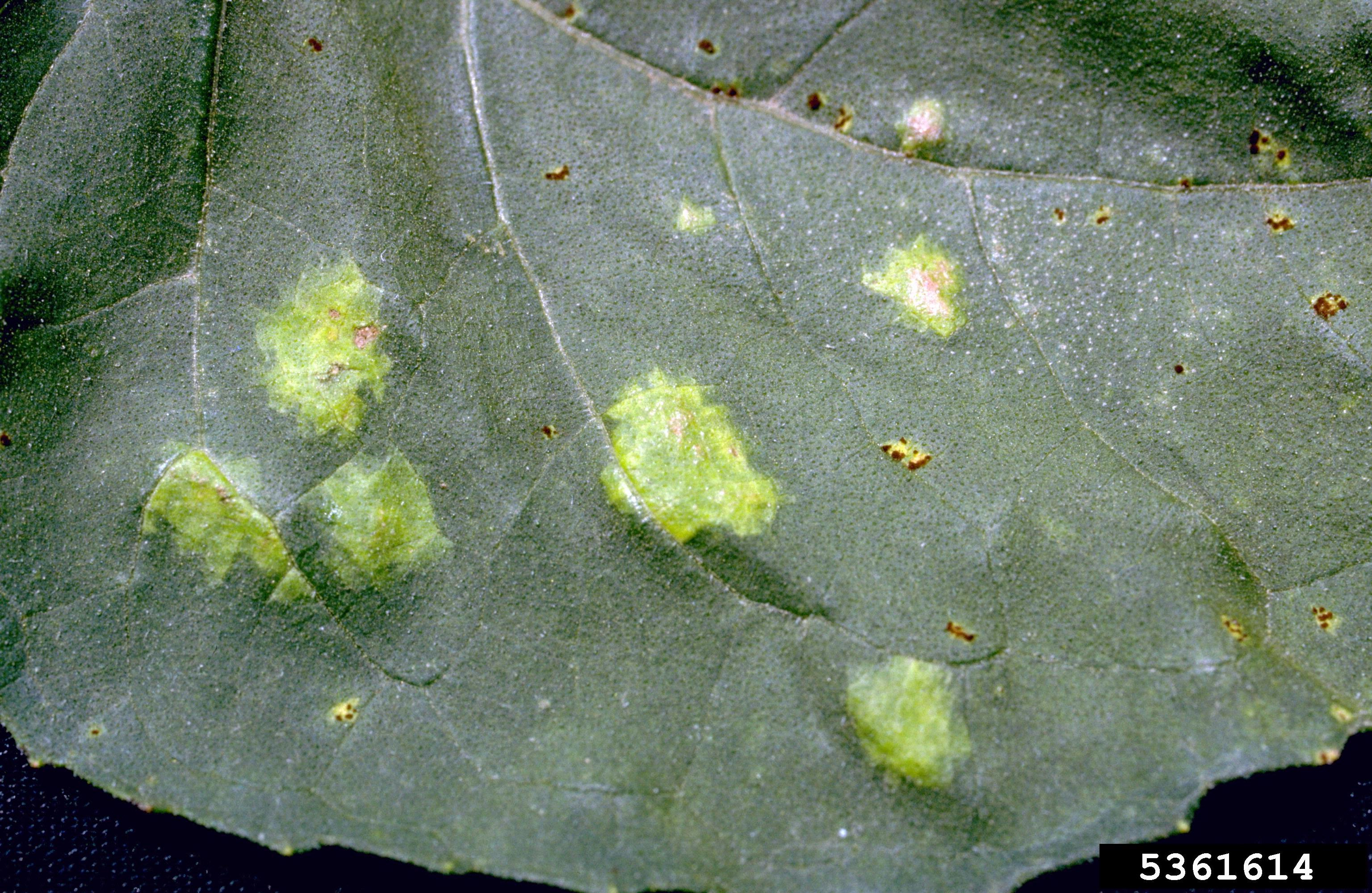
White rust symptoms on a sunflower leaf Pustula helianthicola.

== Disease cycle ==
White rust is an obligate parasite. This means it needs a living host to grow and reproduce. The Albuginaceae reproduce by producing both sexual spores (called oospores) and asexual spores (called sporangia) in a many-stage (polycyclic) disease cycle.

The thick-walled oospores are the main overwintering structures, but the mycelium can also survive in conditions where all the plant material is not destroyed during the winter. In the spring the oospores germinate and produce sporangia on short stalks called sporangiophores that become so tightly packed within the leaf that they rupture the epidermis and are consequently spread by the wind. The liberated sporangia in turn can either germinate directly with a germ tube or begin to produce biflagellate motile zoospores. These zoospores then swim in a film of water to a suitable site and each one produces a germ tube - like that of the sporangium - that penetrates the stoma. When the oomycete has successfully invaded the host plant, it grows and continues to reproduce.

== Environment ==
Favorable conditions for the dispersal and consequent infection of white rust from diseased to healthy plants are most common in the autumn and spring seasons. This pathogen prefers cool, moist conditions for the spread and formation of new infections. Conversely, it rarely infects in warm, dry conditions. Albugo is very temperature sensitive, with the optimal temperature range for infection between 55 and 77 °F (13 and 25 °C). The likelihood of germination and infection is considerably lower if temperatures deviate too far outside this optimum range.

Light rain or irrigation lasting for extended periods of time is also ideal for disease development. Leaf surfaces need to remain wet for at least 2 to 3 hours to ensure infection by the pathogen. White rust ranges worldwide and is able to survive varying weather conditions due to its production of multiple spore types.

== Management ==
Controlling white rust is very difficult due to the nature of the Albugo pathogen. The method of control is tailored to specific crops and production systems. This is why identification of specific hosts (crops and possible weeds) is necessary to determine range and location of control methods.

Albugo proliferates in wet and moist conditions so movement through infected fields should be limited after spore maturation in these conditions to limit spread. Minimizing irrigation in cool and moist seasons as well as eliminating windbreaks to allow faster leaf drying can be beneficial. When infection is recognized, systemically infected plant material (including culled crops) should be completely removed and destroyed. Fields should be inspected every 7–14 days to remove additional material and monitor spread. On root crops, infected leaf removal either by mowing or plowing prior to harvest will limit the spread of the pathogen during harvest. Any susceptible plants or weeds should be mowed or eliminated to reduce spread.

Both conventional and organic fungicides are available and could be used to limit spread and yield losses during the spring, early summer and fall on crops and susceptible neighboring plants. Each of the 17 specific races of the white rust pathogen affects different plants so monitoring is essential as much as possible to limit overuse and cost of fungicide treatments. Common OMRI fungicides include sulphur, copper oxide, rosemary oil, and azadirachtin products. Common conventional fungicides include mefenoxam and fosetyl-aluminum products.

There are some resistant and partially resistant varieties which are necessary in landscapes where white rust is present. Long-term white rust persistence in fields is not an issue with all crops or in all states; however, non-susceptible crop rotation in infected fields for at least three years is widely recommended to limit establishment and wider dispersal of this pathogen from plant debris, soil, and perennial root material. This pathogen can eliminate viable production of susceptible crops in specific fields indefinitely if infection is widespread over many years.

== Importance ==
White rust can be a devastating disease on many important agricultural crops throughout the world. Seventeen races of white rust have been identified worldwide, each with a high level of host specificity. White rust is an economically important foliar disease, causing substantial yield losses and eventual death of various crops. Yield losses of up to 20 percent have been recorded in canola fields, and white rust is considered the most important foliar disease of Brassicaceae species in Australia.

== See also ==
- Plant pathology
