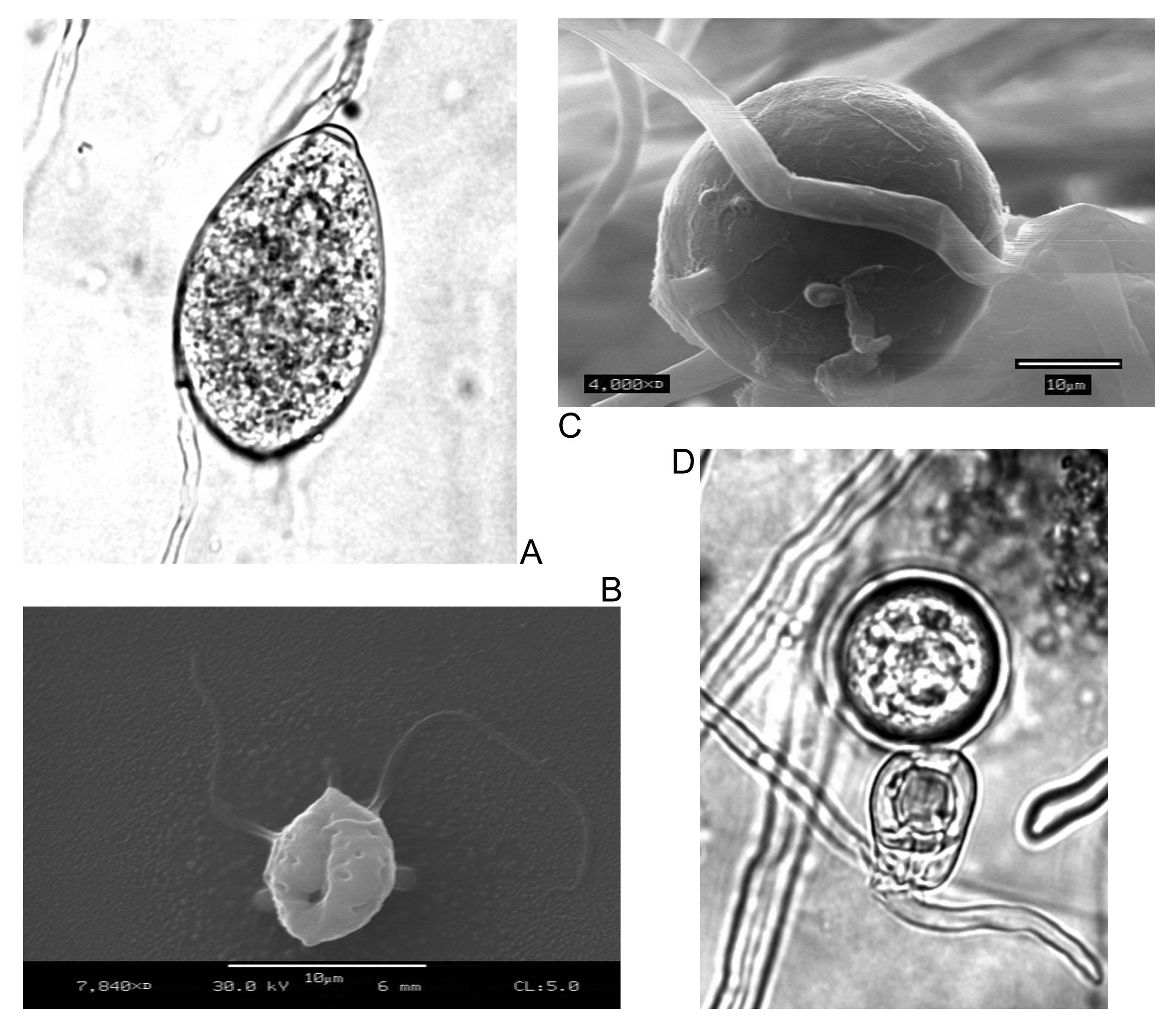
- Asexual (A: sporangia, B: zoospores, C: chlamydospores) and sexual (D: oospores) reproductive structures of Phytophthora infestans (Peronosporales)

Scientific classification
- Domain: Eukaryota
- Supergroup: Stramenopiles
- Clade: Pseudofungi
- Division: Oomycota

Orders and families
- Diatomophthoraceae; Miraculaceae; Albuginales; Albuginaceae; Lagenidiales; Lagenidiaceae; Olpidiosidaceae; Sirolpidiaceae; Leptomitales; Leptomitaceae; Peronosporales; Albuginaceae; Peronosporaceae; Pythiaceae; Rhipidiales; Rhipidaceae; Saprolegniales; Ectrogellaceae; Haliphthoraceae; Leptolegniellaceae; Saprolegniaceae

Synonyms
- Peronosporomycetes Dick 2001

= Oomycete =

Oomycetes Temporal range: Devonian–Recent

Fungus-like eukaryotic microorganism

The oomycetes (/ˌoʊ.əˈmaɪsiːts/), or Oomycota, form a distinct phylogenetic lineage of fungus-like eukaryotic microorganisms within the Stramenopiles. They are filamentous and heterotrophic, and can reproduce both sexually and asexually. Sexual reproduction of an oospore is the result of contact between hyphae of male antheridia and female oogonia; these spores can overwinter and are known as resting spores. Asexual reproduction involves the formation of chlamydospores and sporangia, producing motile zoospores. Oomycetes occupy both saprophytic and pathogenic lifestyles, and include some of the most notorious plant pathogens, causing devastating diseases such as late blight of potato and sudden oak death. One oomycete, the mycoparasite Pythium oligandrum, is used for biocontrol, attacking plant pathogenic fungi. The oomycetes are also often referred to as water molds (or water moulds), although the water-preferring nature that led to that name is not true of most species, which are terrestrial pathogens.

Oomycetes were originally grouped with fungi due to similarities in morphology and lifestyle. However, molecular and phylogenetic studies revealed significant differences between fungi and oomycetes, which means the latter are now grouped with the stramenopiles (which include some types of algae). The Oomycota have a relatively sparse fossil record; though the earliest records of oomycetes extend back to the Devonian, around 407 million years ago.

== Etymology ==
Oomycota comes from oo- (Ancient Greek: ωόν, romanized: ōon, lit. 'egg') and -mycete (Ancient Greek: μύκητας, romanized: mýkitas, lit. 'fungus'), referring to the large round oogonia, structures containing the female gametes, that are characteristic of the oomycetes.

The name "water mold" refers to their earlier classification as fungi and their preference for conditions of high humidity and running surface water, which is characteristic for the basal taxa of the oomycetes.

== Morphology ==
The oomycetes rarely have septa (see hypha), and if they do, they are scarce, appearing at the bases of sporangia, and sometimes in older parts of the filaments. Some are unicellular, while others are filamentous and branching.

Representation of an oomycete: 1. Anterior flagellum; 2. Mastigonemes, "hairs" attached to flagellum; 3. Flattened cisternae; 4. Peripheral vesicle; 5. Phospholipid vesicle; 6. Contractile vacuole, regulates the quantity of water inside a cell; 7. Groove; 8. Golgi apparatus; modifies proteins and sends them out of the cell; 9. Flagellar rootlet; 10. K-body (microbody); 11. Basal body; 12. Nucleolus; 13. Nucleus; 14. Endoplasmic reticulum, the transport network for molecules going to specific parts of the cell; 15. Mitochondrion, creates ATP (energy) for the cell; 16. Lipid vesicle; 17. Cellulose vesicle; 18. Posterior flagellum

== Classification ==
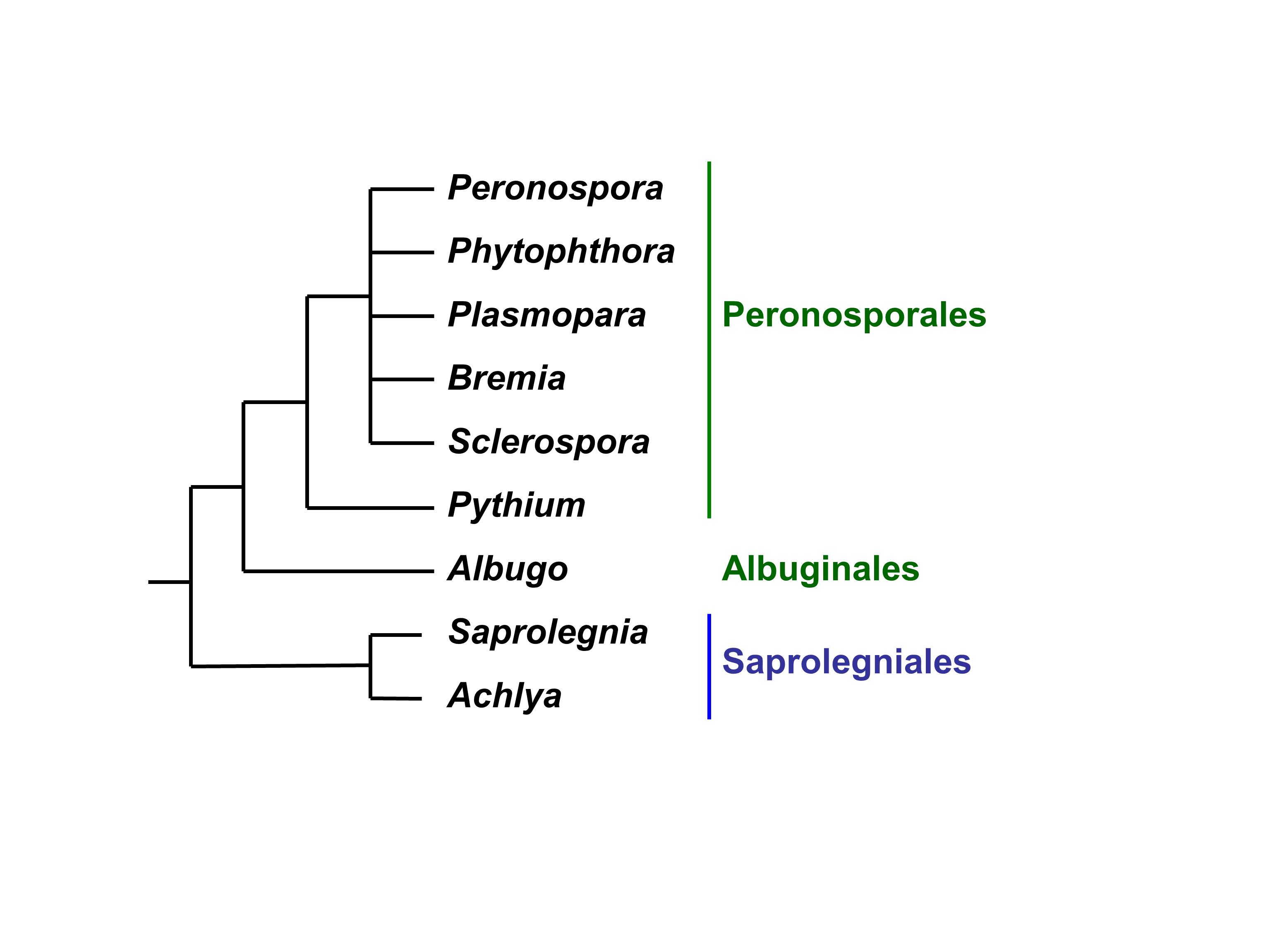
Simplified phylogeny.

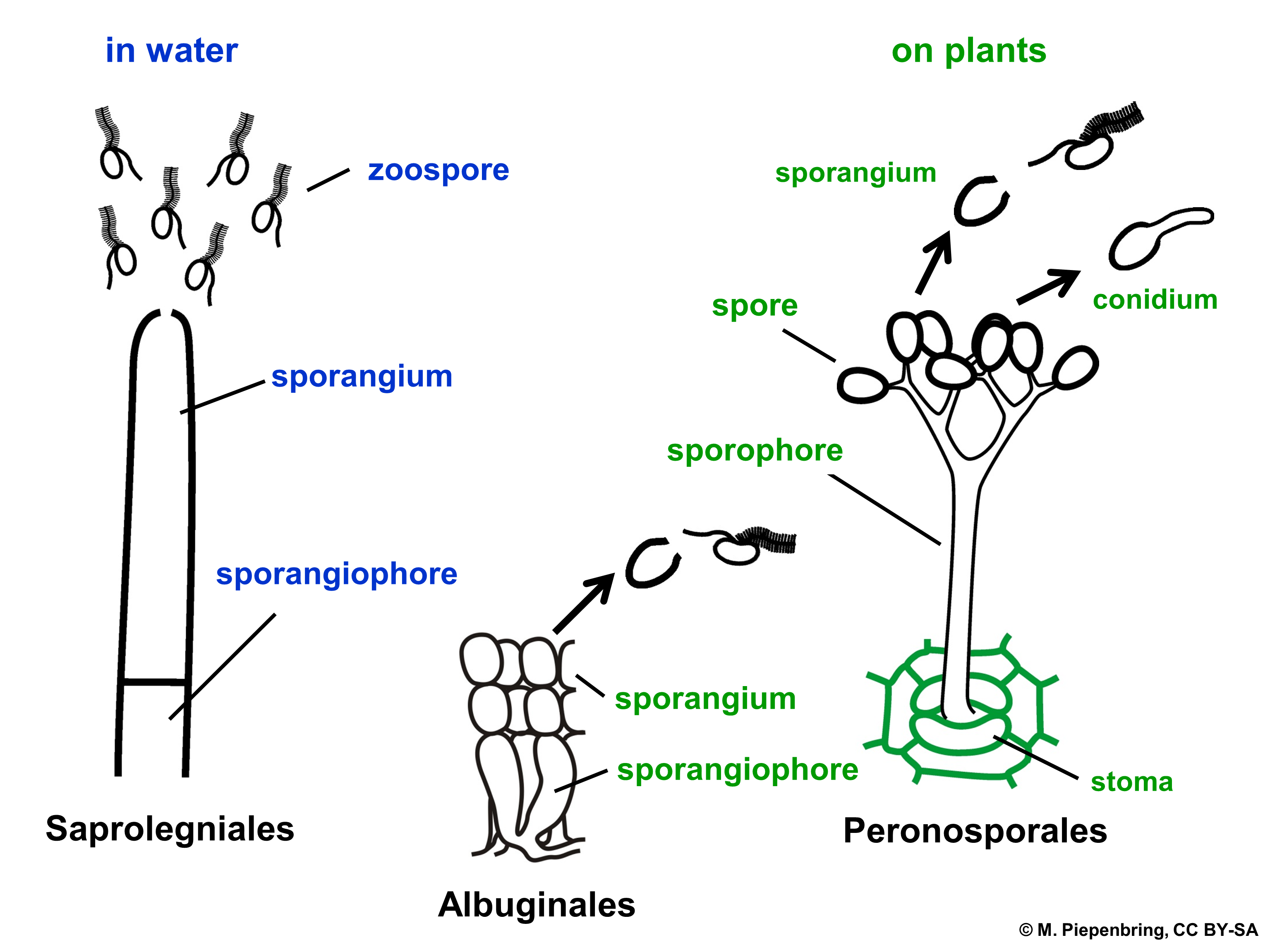
Asexual structures (sporangia) in Saprolegniales, Albuginales and Peronosporales

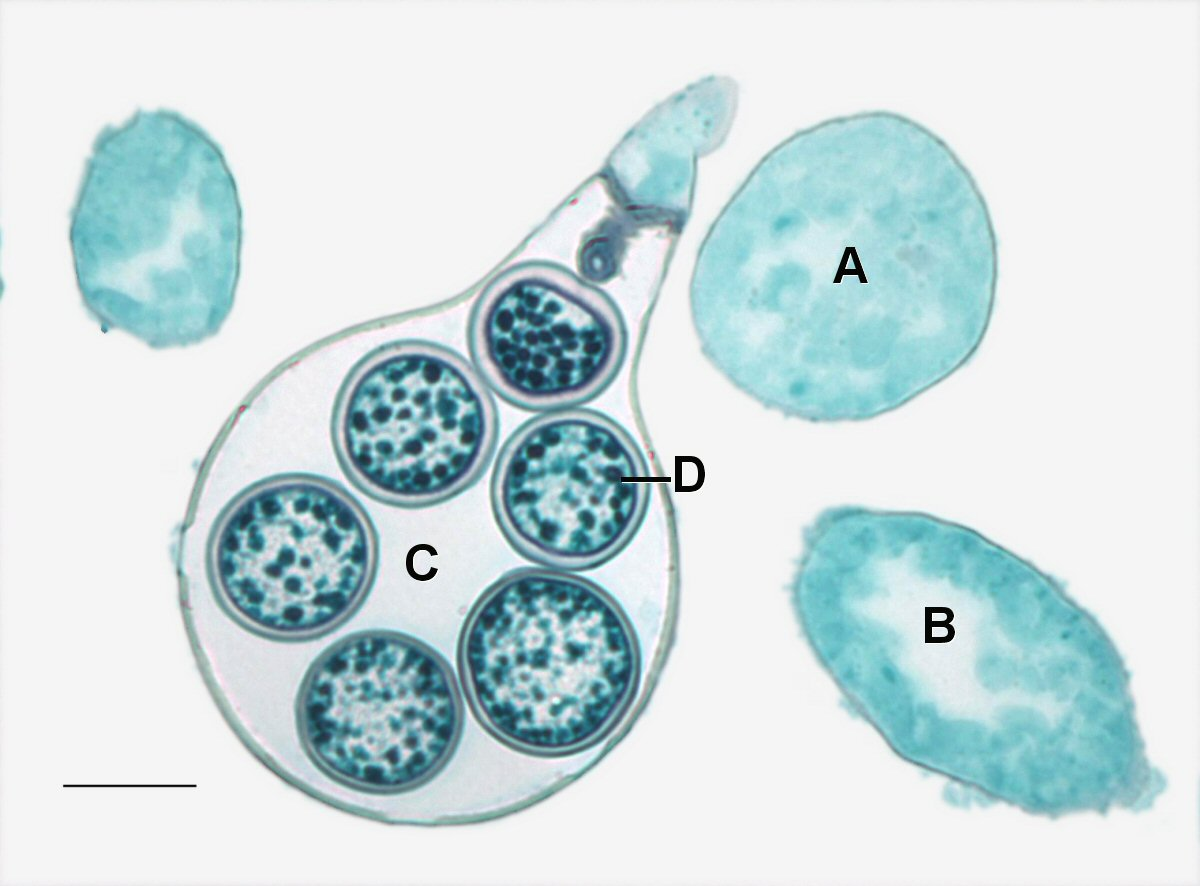
Sexual structures (only oogonia, antheridia not shown) of Saprolegnia.

Previously the group was arranged into six orders.

- The Saprolegniales are the most widespread. Many break down decaying matter; others are parasites.
- The Leptomitales have wall thickenings that give their continuous cell body the appearance of septation. They bear chitin and often reproduce asexually.
- The Rhipidiales use rhizoids to attach their thallus to the bed of stagnant or polluted water bodies.
- The Albuginales are considered by some authors to be a family (Albuginaceae) within the Peronosporales, although it has been shown that they are phylogenetically distinct from this order.
- The Peronosporales too are mainly saprophytic or parasitic on plants, and have an aseptate, branching form. Many of the most damaging agricultural parasites belong to this order.
- The Lagenidiales are the most primitive; some are filamentous, others unicellular; they are generally parasitic.

However more recently this has been expanded considerably.

- Anisolpidiales Dick 2001
  - Anisolpidiaceae Karling 1943
- Lagenismatales Dick 2001
  - Lagenismataceae Dick 1995
- Salilagenidiales Dick 2001
  - Salilagenidiaceae Dick 1995
- Rozellopsidales Dick 2001
  - Rozellopsidaceae Dick 1995
  - Pseudosphaeritaceae Dick 1995
- Ectrogellales
  - Ectrogellaceae
- Haptoglossales
  - Haptoglossaceae
- Eurychasmales
  - Eurychasmataceae Petersen 1905
- Haliphthorales
  - Haliphthoraceae Vishniac 1958
- Olpidiopsidales
  - Sirolpidiaceae Cejp 1959
  - Pontismataceae Petersen 1909 (contains Petersenia Sparrow, 1934, Pontisma H.E.Petersen, 1905
  - Olpidiopsidaceae Cejp 1959
- Atkinsiellales
  - Atkinisellaceae
  - Crypticolaceae Dick 1995
- Saprolegniales
  - Achlyaceae
  - Verrucalvaceae Dick 1984
  - Saprolegniaceae Warm. 1884 [Leptolegniaceae]
- Leptomitales
  - Leptomitaceae Kuetz. 1843 [Apodachlyellaceae Dick 1986]
  - Leptolegniellaceae Dick 1971 [Ducellieriaceae Dick 1995]
- Rhipidiales
  - Rhipidiaceae Cejp 1959
- Albuginales
  - Albuginaceae Schroet. 1893
- Peronosporales [Pythiales; Sclerosporales; Lagenidiales]
  - Salisapiliaceae
  - Pythiaceae Schroet. 1893 [Pythiogetonaceae; Lagenaceae Dick 1994; Lagenidiaceae; Peronophythoraceae; Myzocytiopsidaceae Dick 1995]
  - Peronosporaceae Warm. 1884 [Sclerosporaceae Dick 1984]

== Phylogenetic relationships ==
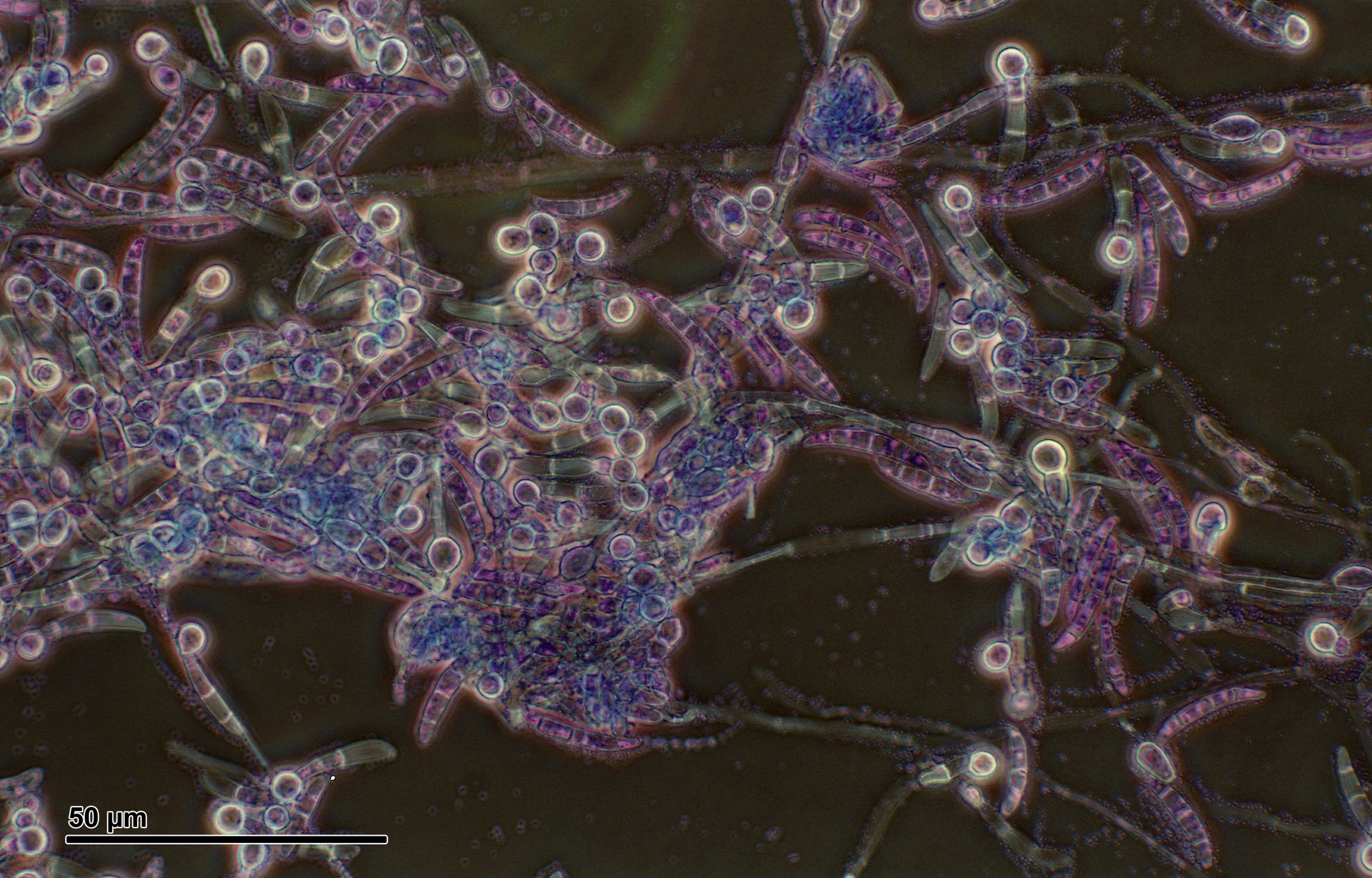
Pythium sp. (Peronosporales), which causes pythiosis in animals, under microscope.

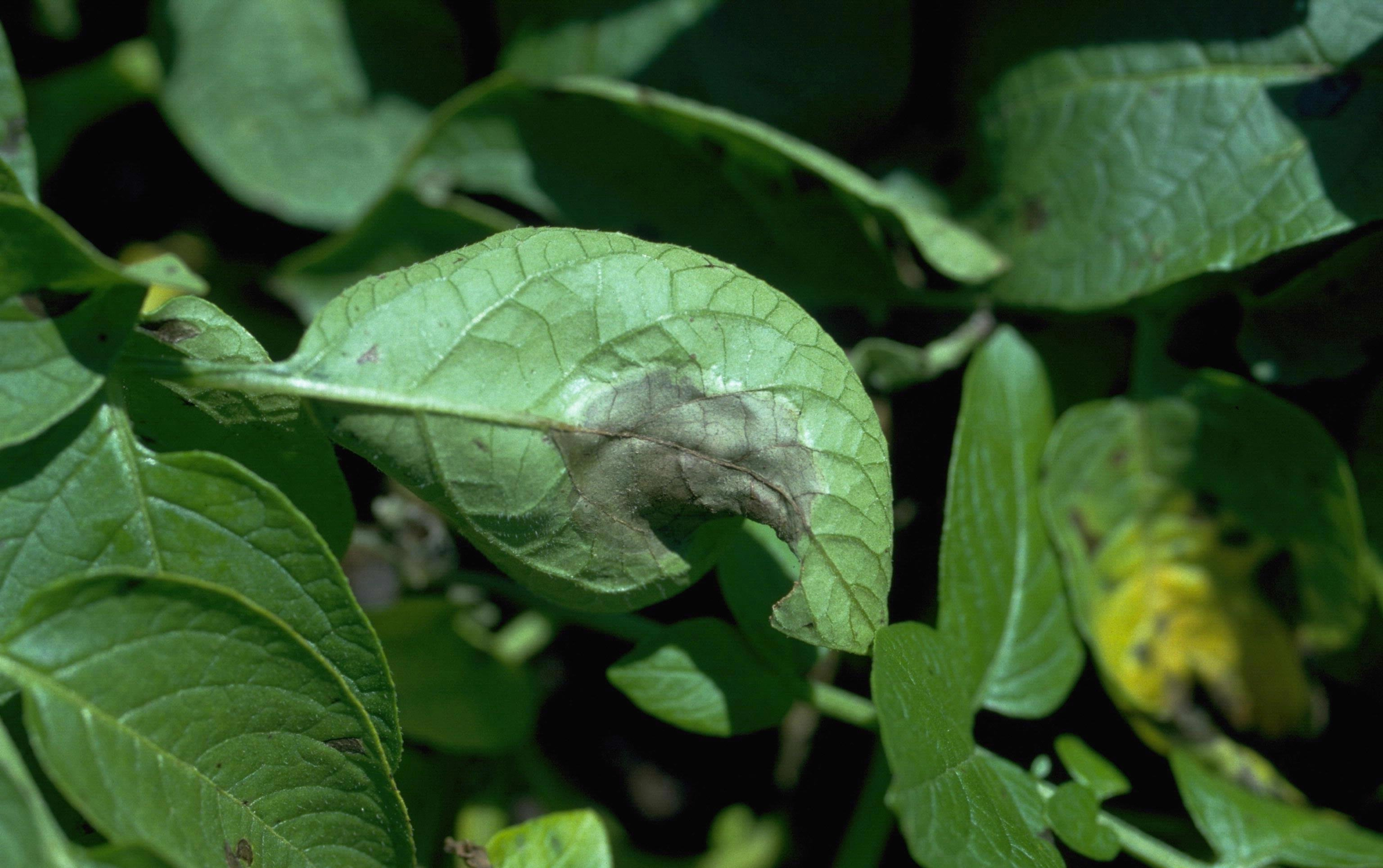
Symptom of late blight (P. infestans, Peronosporales) on the underside of a potato leaf.

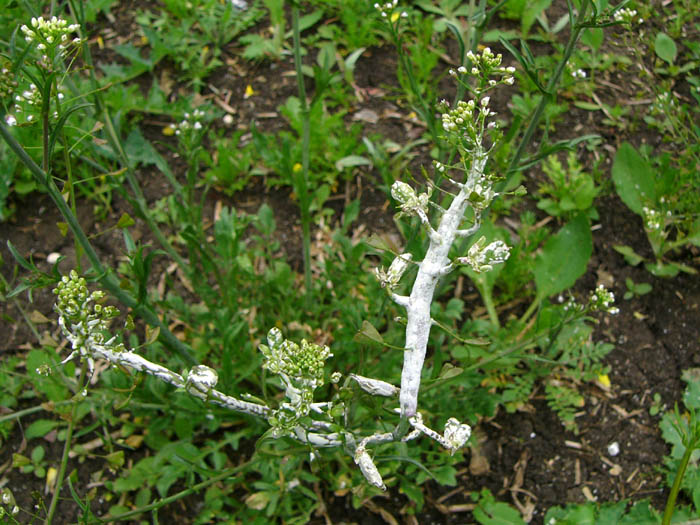
Albugo candida (Albuginales) on shepherd's purse (Capsella bursa-pastoris, Brassicales).

=== Internal ===
- - - Haptoglossales
    - Eurychasmales
  - - Haliphthorales
    - - Olpidiopsidales
      - Oogametia
        - Saprolegniomycetes
          - Atkinsiellales
          - - Saprolegniales
            - Leptomitales
        - Peronosporomycetes s.s.
          - Rhipidiales
          - - Albuginales
            - Peronosporales

=== External ===
This group was originally classified among the fungi (the name "oomycota" means "egg fungus") and later treated as protists, based on general morphology and lifestyle. A cladistic analysis based on modern discoveries about the biology of these organisms supports a relatively close relationship with some photosynthetic organisms, such as brown algae and diatoms. A common taxonomic classification based on these data, places the class Oomycetes along with other classes such as the brown algae within the Stramenopiles.

This relationship is supported by a number of observed differences between the characteristics of oomycetes and fungi. For instance, the cell walls of oomycetes are composed of cellulose rather than chitin and generally do not have septations. Also, in the vegetative state, they have diploid nuclei, whereas fungi have haploid nuclei. Most oomycetes produce self-motile zoospores with two flagella. One flagellum has a "whiplash" morphology, and the other a branched "tinsel" morphology. The "tinsel" flagellum is unique to the Kingdom Heterokonta. Spores of the few fungal groups that retain flagella (such as the Chytridiomycetes) have only one whiplash flagellum. Oomycota and fungi have different metabolic pathways for synthesizing lysine and have a number of enzymes that differ. The ultrastructure is also different, with oomycota having tubular mitochondrial cristae and fungi having flattened cristae.

In spite of this, many species of oomycetes are still described or listed as types of fungi and may sometimes be referred to as pseudofungi, or lower fungi.

== Biology ==
=== Reproduction ===
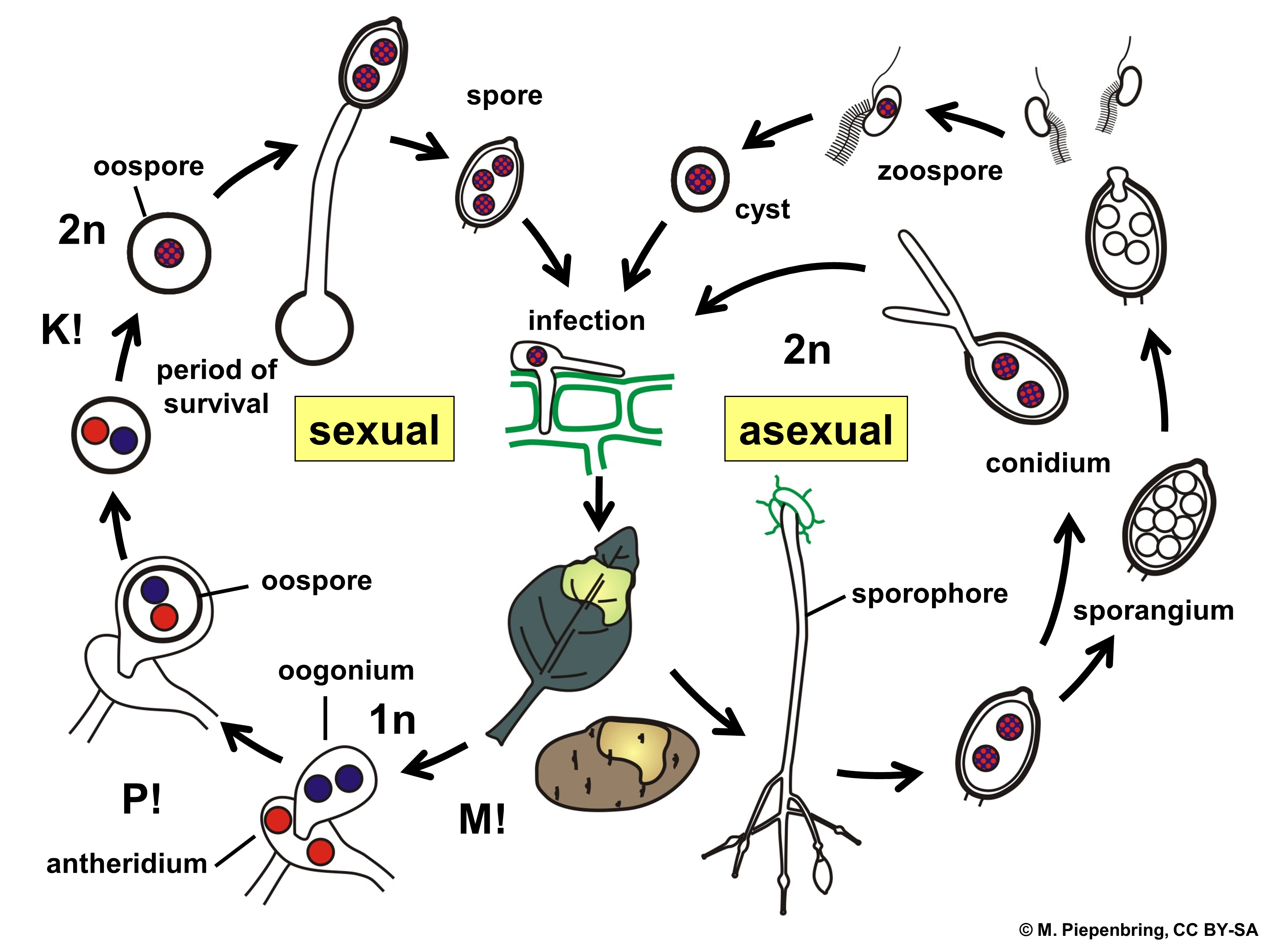
Life cycle of Phytophthora infestans (Peronosporales) on potato. M: meiosis, P: plasmogamy, K: karyogamy, n: haploid, 2n: diploid.

Most of the oomycetes produce two distinct types of spores. The main dispersive spores are asexual, self-motile spores called zoospores, which are capable of chemotaxis (movement toward or away from a chemical signal, such as those released by potential food sources) in surface water (including precipitation on plant surfaces). A few oomycetes produce aerial asexual spores that are distributed by wind. They also produce sexual spores, called oospores, that are translucent, double-walled, spherical structures used to survive adverse environmental conditions.

=== Ecology and pathogenicity ===
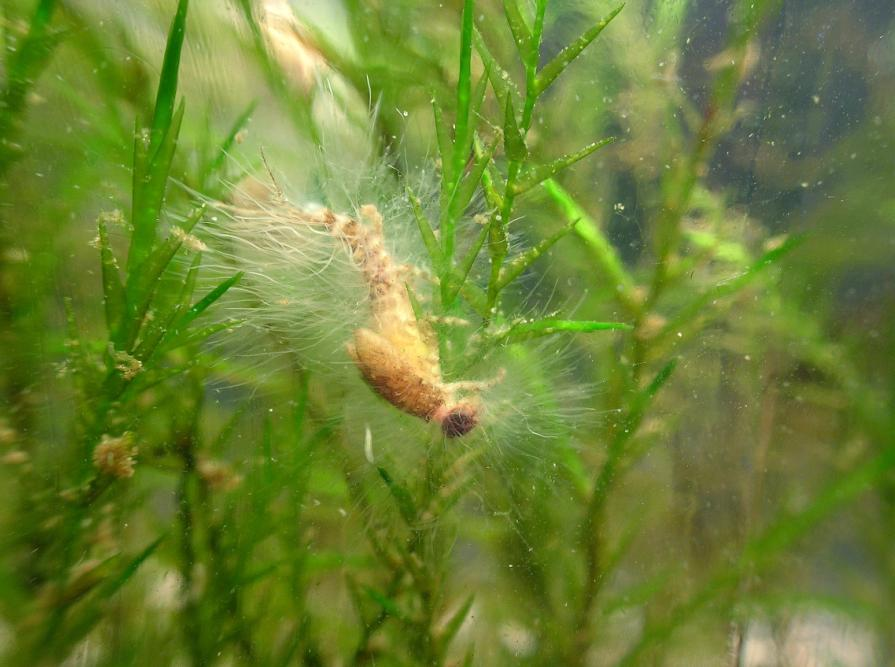
Unidentified water mold on dead larval mayfly.

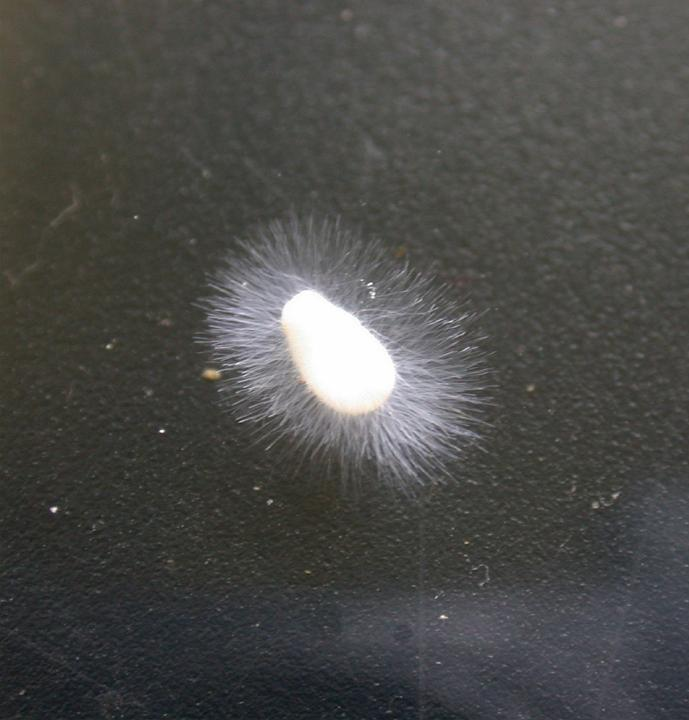
A culture of Achlya sp. (Saprolegniales) isolated from a stream.

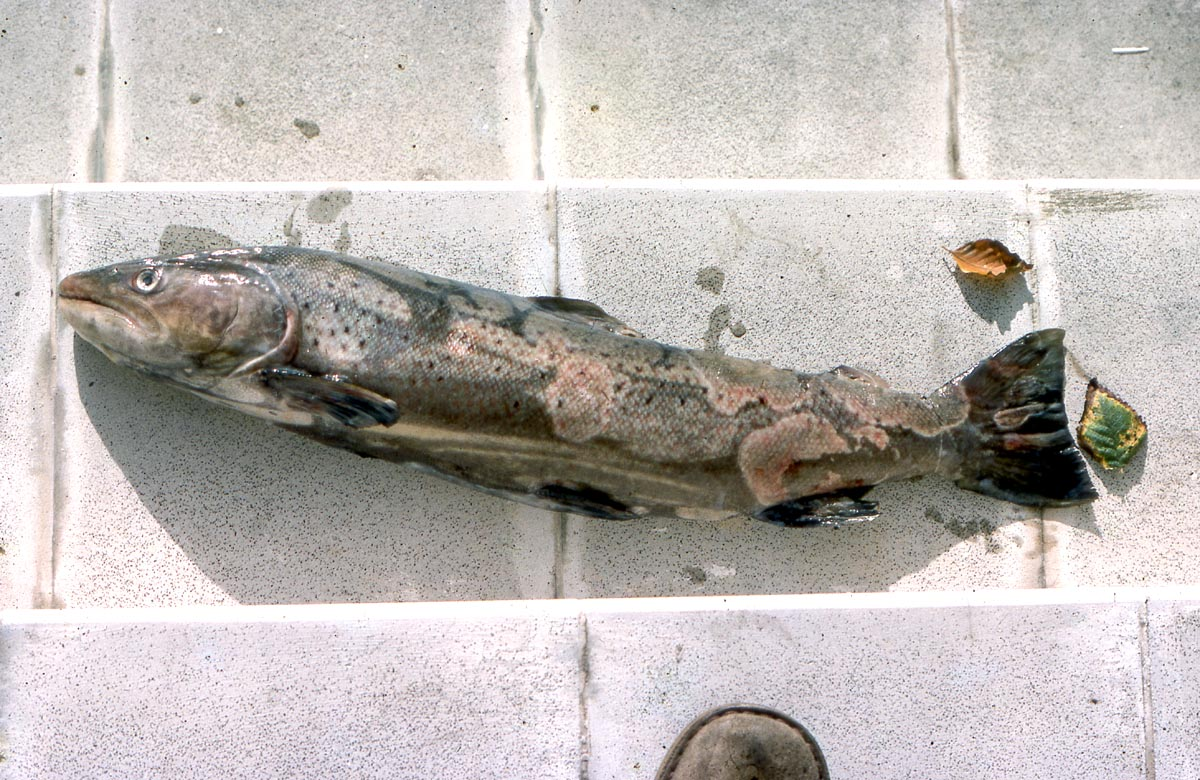
Sea trout suffering from UDN with secondary Saprolegnia infections.

Many oomycetes species are economically important, aggressive algae and plant pathogens. Some species can cause disease in fish, and at least one is a pathogen of mammals. The majority of the plant pathogenic species can be classified into four groups, although more exist.

- The Phytophthora group is a paraphyletic genus that causes diseases such as dieback, late blight in potatoes (the cause of the Great Famine of the 1840s that ravaged Ireland and other parts of Europe), sudden oak death, rhododendron root rot, and ink disease in the European chestnut
- The paraphyletic Pythium group is more prevalent than Phytophthora and individual species have larger host ranges, although usually causing less damage. Pythium damping off is a very common problem in greenhouses, where the organism kills newly emerged seedlings. Mycoparasitic members of this group (e.g. P. oligandrum) parasitize other oomycetes and fungi, and have been employed as biocontrol agents. One Pythium species, Pythium insidiosum, also causes Pythiosis in mammals.
- The third group are the downy mildews, which are easily identifiable by the appearance of white, brownish or olive "mildew" on the leaf undersides (although this group can be confused with the unrelated fungal powdery mildews).
- The fourth group are the white blister rusts, Albuginales, which cause white blister disease on a variety of flowering plants. White blister rusts sporulate beneath the epidermis of their hosts, causing spore-filled blisters on stems, leaves and the inflorescence. The Albuginales are currently divided into three genera, Albugo parasitic predominantly to Brassicales, Pustula, parasitic predominantly to Asterales, and Wilsoniana, predominantly parasitic to Caryophyllales. Like the downy mildews, the white blister rusts are obligate biotrophs, which means that they are unable to survive without the presence of a living host.
