= Pythium porphyrae =

Scientific classification
- Domain: Eukaryota
- Clade: Sar
- Clade: Stramenopiles
- Phylum: Oomycota
- Class: Peronosporomycetes
- Order: Peronosporales
- Family: Pythiaceae
- Genus: Pythium
- Species: P. porphyrae

Binomial name
- Pythium porphyrae M. Takah. & M. Sasaki, 1977

Synonyms
- Pythium chondricola De Cock, 1986

Parasitic species of oomycete that causes red rot disease in seaweed

Pythium porphyrae, is a parasitic species of oomycete in the family Pythiaceae. It is the cause of red rot disease or red wasting disease, also called akagusare (赤ぐされ) in Japanese. The specific epithet porphyrae (πορφυρα) stems from the genus of one of its common hosts, Porphyra, and the purple-red color of the lesions on the thallus of the host. However, many of its hosts have been moved from the genus Porphyra to Pyropia.

== Economic impact ==
Pythium porphyrae can destroy an entire crop of nori within three weeks. It prefers low salinity and warm water (24–28 °C). It will only grow in the 15–35 °C range. Mild winters correlate with higher infestations and lower crop yields, possibly due to decreased temperatures inducing the development of sex organs in the oomycete. Losses can be combated by destroying diseased fronds and exposing thalli to the air for 3–4 hours daily. The oospores can be spread in contaminated organic matter and the sporangia can spread through the water.

== Description ==
Pythium porphyrae has a mycelial thallus that is eucarpic, meaning only part of the thallus turns into sporangia. It is primarily a facultative parasite of algae, but can also be saprobic.

Its hyphae can grow up to 4.5 μm wide, and are not septate. On algae, the hyphae will extend through the cell wall. It does not have haustoria not chlamydospores. The appressoria are club-shaped. It has sporangia that are unbranched, filamentous, and non-inflated, typically forming 6–17 zoospores per vesicle. Encysted zoospores are 8–12 μm in diameter. Hyphal swellings are intercalary and globose, from 12–28 μm in diameter. Oogonia average 17 μm in diameter and are also intercalary and globose, but rarely are terminal. In each oogonium are 1–2 diclinous antheridia coming out far away from the oogonial stalk. The antheridia's cells are clavate (club shaped) or globose. The antheridia will be apical to the oogonial wall. Sometimes there will be two antheridial cells on one stalk. The yellowish oospores average 15 μm in diameter, have thick (~2 μm) walls, and are plerotic (fill the whole oogonium). Conidia are spherical at 8.8–30.8 μm diameter, but rarely produced.

Pythium porphyrae shares many physical traits with P. marinum and P. monospermum, and appears to be most closely related to P. adhaerens. However it has up to four diclinous antheridia and sometimes two antheridial cells per stalk; P. monospermum has 1–4 either diclinous or monoclinous antheridia and P. marinum has only a single diclinous antheridium. P. monospermum and P. marinum also have oogonia terminally on short branches, yet in P. porphyrae they tent to be intercalary.

In a laboratory it will grow 5 mm per day on seawater-cornmeal agar with low aerial mycelium and colorless colonies, but will not grow at all on potato-carrot agar.

== Ecology ==
Pythium porphyrae has been found in Japan, Netherlands, New Zealand, and Korea, but this range is likely underreported. It has a parasitic relationship with the following hosts. Though some species of Pyropia and Porphyra are susceptible to infection in their gametophytic phase, they are resistant in their Conchocelis (sporophytic) phase.

- Bangia atropurpurea
- Callophyllis adhaerens
- Chondrus crispus
- Gelidium elegans
- Gloiosiphonia capillaris
- Gracilaria spp.
- Grateloupia turuturu
- Griffithsia subcylindrica
- Lomentaria hakodatensis
- Mastocarpus papillatus
- Polyopes affinis (Carpopeltis affinis)
- Polysiphonia morrowii
- Pterocladiella capillacea
- Pyropia cinnamomea
- Pyropia plicata
- Pyropia suborbiculata
- Pyropia tenera
- Pyropia virididentata
- Pyropia yezoensis
- Rhodymenia intricata
- Stylonema alsidii
- Wrangelia tanegana

== Taxonomy ==
A 2005 study concerning a case of Pythiosis from a related species (P. insidiosum) indicated that P. porphyrae is related to P. dissotocum, P. myriotylum, P. volutum, and P. vanterpoolii.

In 2004, molecular analysis of Pythium determined that P. porphyrae is in "Clade A" along with P. adhaerens, P. deliense, P. aphanidermatum, and P. monospermum Clade A has two clusters, and P. porphyrae shares one with the species also originating on algae, P. adhaerens.

A 2017 study of Pythium species in Clade A showed the following phylogenetic tree. It further demonstrated that P. porphyrae and P. chondricola are the same species. P. adhaerens may also be conspecific based solely on genetic comparison, but showed a number of physical differences that show it may be a separate but very closely related species.

- - - P. deliense
    - P. aphanidermatum
  - - P. monospermum
    - - P. adhaerens
      - P. porphyrae/P. chondricola
- P. insidiosum

== See also ==
- Pythium in turfgrass
- Pythiosis
