= Pythium graminicola =

Scientific classification
- Domain: Eukaryota
- Clade: Sar
- Clade: Stramenopiles
- Phylum: Oomycota
- Class: Peronosporomycetes
- Order: Peronosporales
- Family: Pythiaceae
- Genus: Pythium
- Species: P. graminicola

Binomial name
- Pythium graminicola Subraman., (1928)

Species of single-celled organism

Pythium graminicola is a plant pathogen infecting cereals.

== Host and symptoms ==
Pythium graminicola infects a wide range of hosts, including: bent grass, turmeric, cotton, barley, wheat, rice, beans, peas, and sugarcane. In particular Pythium graminicola is an important pathogen of graminaceous plants. As with many Pythium diseases, the most common symptom of Pythium graminicola is root/seed rot, which can then cause damping off. However, Pythium graminicola can also infect above ground tissue causing stalk rot in maize, foot rot of beans, leaf blight of grasses and feeder root necrosis in rice, sugarcane and maize. Diagnosis of Pythium graminicola can be made through observation of the above symptoms and the presence of oomycete structures, such as sporangia.

== Disease cycle ==
The life cycle of Pythium graminicola is essentially the same as the generalized Pythium, soil borne pathogen life cycle. In the sexual state of Pythium graminicola an antheridium and an oogonium combine to make an oospore. An oospore has a thick cell wall and can survive and overwinter either in the soil or on plant debris. These oospores act as the primary innoculum by remaining dormant for up to ten years and the germinating when conditions are right. Oospores can be disseminated by wind, or, if in the soil, can infect host seedlings causing systemic infection. The oospores that infect plants then create sporangia, the asexual state of Pythium graminicola, which acts as a secondary innoculum, making the disease cycle polycyclic. Sporangia can be disseminated by wind and produce zoospores, which act as the infection agent. Zoospores can swim a short distance in water using flagellum helping them to reach the host plant. Zoospores infect the host plant by adhering to the plant surface and then germinating into the host plant with hyphae. Pythium infects and spreads through roots very fast. Penetration occurs quickly, and the cell wall does not act as an important barrier to keep Pythium graminicola from infecting the plant.

== Management ==
There are several current practices used to manage Pythium graminicola, including: chemical control, biological control, use of genetic resistance, and control through cultural practices. Chemical control involves using specific pesticides such as benomyl, captafol, captan, carboxin, metalaxyl, propamocarb hydrochloride, and etridiazole to try and kill surviving oospores in the soil. Seeds can also be dipped into chemicals to protect them from seed rot and avoid damping off. Biological control involves using microorganisms that protect the plant roots by producing antifungal metabolites and competing with the pathogen for nutrients. There are already commercially available biological control products for Pythium root rot created from isolates of Trichoderma spp. and Gliocladium spp., which are antagonists of Pythium-induced soil-borne diseases. Genetic resistance involves finding species of plant that are not susceptible to Pythium graminicola. Cultural practice is a broad category that essential includes any practice that does not use the above controls methods. An example of cultural practice is avoiding growing crops in environments that the disease thrives in. Another example would be using composts with specific compositions, such as composts prepared from brewery sludge, Endicott biosolids, and some animal manures, to suppress damping-off and root rot.
