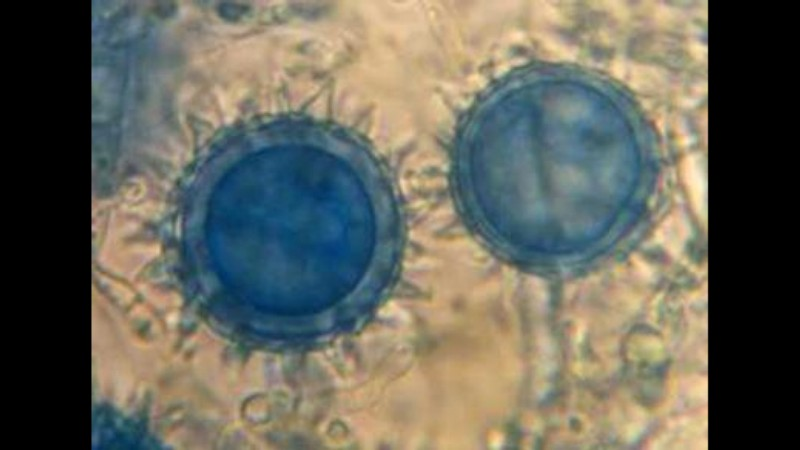
- Pythium oligandrum

Scientific classification
- Domain: Eukaryota
- Clade: Sar
- Clade: Stramenopiles
- Clade: Pseudofungi
- Phylum: Oomycota
- Class: Oomycetes
- Order: Peronosporales
- Family: Pythiaceae
- Genus: Pythium
- Species: P. oligandrum

Binomial name
- Pythium oligandrum Dreschler

= Pythium oligandrum =

Species of oomycete that parasitizes fungi

Pythium oligandrum is an oomycete. It is a parasite of many fungi and other oomycetes including Botrytis, Fusarium and Phytophthora. It has been licensed as a biocontrol agent in the form of an oospore soil treatment, which reduces pathogen load and concomitant plant disease. P. oligandrum have been found to express several genes belonging to the CAZy-family when feeding on prey. P. oligandrum can grow within the roots of certain plants, including tomato and sugar beet. Production of auxin-like substances stimulate plant growth. Defense responses can be induced in the plant, which primes the plant from further infection by pathogenic fungi, oomycetes or bacteria.

== Toxicology ==
UC IPM provides an automated tool to evaluate the ecotoxicology risk of the use of P. oligandrum.
