= Pythium aristosporum =

Scientific classification
- Domain: Eukaryota
- Clade: Sar
- Clade: Stramenopiles
- Phylum: Oomycota
- Class: Peronosporomycetes
- Order: Peronosporales
- Family: Pythiaceae
- Genus: Pythium
- Species: P. aristosporum

Binomial name
- Pythium aristosporum Vanterp., (1938)

Species of single-celled organism

Pythium aristosporum is a species of pythium under the class oomycota (often referred to as water molds) that causes root dysfunction in creeping bentgrass.

== Hosts and symptoms ==
Pythium aristosporum causes root dysfunction in creeping bentgrass. Creeping bentgrass is a cool season grass that is found mainly on the putting greens, fairways, and tees of golf courses in the Northern United States due to its ability to be cut at very low heights (an eighth of an inch) and survive winters relatively unharmed. It is ideal for golf courses because it grows stoloniferously (with above ground shoots). This allows the grass grow laterally relatively quickly and form dense ground covers, making it ideal for golf courses.

Like the disease name suggests, Pythium aristosporum affects the roots of creeping bentgrass. While there are no macroscopic signs, there are a few above and belowground symptoms that plants infected with this disease will exhibit. Aboveground, there will be dieback on the tip of the grass blade and the grass will turn from the lush green to a yellow/brown color typically in circular patches. Symptoms aboveground are secondary, and a result of the necrosis of the roots. Belowground, the roots will die back, turn a pale tan color, and lose their root hairs. These symptoms are systemic, as they involve the whole plant, and the mass of root tissue that is lost is a primary symptom because it is a direct result of the pythium. Listed are all macroscopic symptoms, or ones that can be seen without the use of magnification.

Microscopically, hyphae are visible. The primary survival structures of pythium are oospores and sporangia. Oospores and sporangia are circular in shape. Antheridia and oogonia would also be present on hyphal cells. The oogonium is in the shape of a circle that is connected to the hyphae and the antheridium looks like a branch of hyphae that connects to the oogonium to produce oospores.

== Disease cycle ==
Pythium aristosporum infects plants in a variety of ways such as through wind, water, overwintering in soil, equipment, and infected plants. For the sake of this cycle, the overwintered oospore will be the starting point. Oospores on a plant can use a germ tube to get into the cell of a plant. If not already on a plant cell, the oospore will release a zoosporangium that releases zoospores. Zoospores have two flagella (one tinselated and one whiplash) and are motile, needing water to move and spread. They then encyst on a cell and develop haustoria as a way to leach nutrients from the cell. Once established in the cell, mycelium spread throughout the plant. Sporangia are then able to arise from the mycelia and either directly infect a cell or release zoospores to infect. From there, mycelia are able to spread and the cycle repeats. Because this is able to happen more than once per crop cycle, it is a polycyclic disease. After conditions are no longer conducive to growth and survival (very dry or cold conditions) or the plant has died, haploid antheridia and oogonia from the hyphae fertilize together to create diploid oospores.

== Environment ==
Environment plays a key role on whether the disease develops in a plant or not. While the host plant and microbe may be present, if the environment is not conducive, then there will not be disease. Pythium root dysfunction develops in the roots of creeping bentgrass in the fall, winter, and spring when mean soil temperatures are between 50 and 70 °F. This pathogen reduces the ability of roots to absorb water and nutrients from the soil, which makes the disease much more harmful during times of stress, such as low fertility, low soil oxygen levels, and especially drought. Because of this, symptoms are most common during warm periods in the summer when soil temperature is within key range.

Due to the disease impacting the roots so heavily, creeping bentgrass in sand-heavy soils fare even worse as sandy soils have excellent infiltration and percolation. Turf in soils that are high in organic matter content fares better (once infected) because of the soils ability to retain nutrients and moisture, which allows the hindered roots to be able to absorb them better than if in a very well drained soil. While the soils that retain a higher plant available moisture content allow the plant to survive better once infected with the disease, the best way to prevent it is just the opposite-having soils that allow water to drain well and prevent long periods of pooling. Saturated conditions allow zoospores to spread and infect turf root cells, so it is ideal to prevent the ground from being saturated for too long.

Insects, like billbugs, can also act as vectors by transferring spores or by feeding on roots and creating openings-allowing the oomycete to enter more easily.
