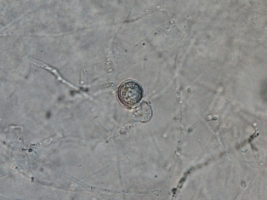
- Oospore of Pythium sulcatum

Scientific classification
- Domain: Eukaryota
- Clade: Sar
- Clade: Stramenopiles
- Phylum: Oomycota
- Class: Peronosporomycetes
- Order: Peronosporales
- Family: Pythiaceae
- Genus: Pythium
- Species: P. sulcatum

Binomial name
- Pythium sulcatum R.G.Pratt & J.E.Mitch., (1973)

= Pythium sulcatum =

Species of single-celled organism

Pythium sulcatum is a chromalveolate plant pathogen infecting carrots. Because this organism was once thought to be a type of fungus, it is still often treated as such.

== Host and symptoms ==
Pythium sulcatum causes diseases predominately on members of the apiaceous family, the most common being the carrot. This pathogen causes cavity spots which are sunken, spherical to elliptical oriented, brown-black spots across the breadth of the surface of the carrot. These cavity spots are normally 1-10 mm in width and are often surrounded by a pale halo. The lesions enlarge as the roots mature, often most prominent around the time the crop is harvested. This pathogen is believed to be native of the apiaceous family that eventually became pathogenic to carrots. P. sulcatum is also seen to cause damping off, taproot dieback, root rotting, stunting, and forking of carrots, with cavity spots being the most common of these diseases. Because carrots are a root vegetable the cavity spots are only apparent after the carrot is harvested and washed.

== Environment ==
Pythium sulcatum can cause disease in both mineral and organic soils. The pathogen prefers wet to moist soils with a relatively acidic pH content, as a pH of 6.8 is ideal. However, the pathogen has been seen to grow in acidic pH of 3-5 and basic pH of 9-10. P. sulcatum prefers a relatively warm temperature, with 20°C–28°C being the most common, 25°C being optimal. This is why the pathogen is most severe in summer and autumn-harvested crops. The pathogen overwinters in the form of an oospore, which can survive several years in the soil and inoculates the host when temperatures become optimal. In heavy moisture and wet soil, the pathogen can also release zoospores that can further increase its population up to 1000-fold. Flooding of soil by heavy rains as well as poorly drained soils have been shown to increase cavity spot disease development.

== Pathogenesis ==
Pythium sulcatum is an oomycete that is slow growing, aggressively virulent, and consistently pathogenic. Pathogenesis begins with the germination of resting spores (oogonia and hyphal swellings), that occurs quickly in response to root exudates. This causes direct infection through the unwounded surface of the root. The lesions form under the intact periderm (corky outer layer of the root) and later ruptures causing dark, elongated lesions to develop. This typically occurs randomly on the root or may be more dense on the upper half.

P. sulcatum is associated with its ability to produce a wide array of cell wall degrading enzymes with significantly high enzymatic activity. These enzymes are: polygalacturonase, pectin lyase, lactate lyase, cellulase, and pectin methylesterase. The digestion of the host cell wall and tissue maceration through the cell-wall degrading enzymes are crucial aspects of penetration and colonization of the carrot tissues in cavity spot pathogenesis. P. sulcatum first begins to secrete polygalacturonase and pectin methylesterase which begins to degrade the pectin in the plant cell’s cell wall. The pathogen then begins to secrete the three-remaining cell-wall degrading enzymes (pectin lyase, pectate lyase, and cellulase) as well as ß-1,4-glucanase and xylanase which further degrade the pectin in the plant cell’s cell wall into oligomers. This is the pathogenic pathway of how P. sulcatum gains entry and infects the root of the carrot. It is postulated that the sequence of enzymic production, in association with a slow growth rate, affects the plant infection response which causes the types of symptoms characteristic of this Pythium species.
