= Pythium violae =

Scientific classification
- Domain: Eukaryota
- Clade: Sar
- Clade: Stramenopiles
- Phylum: Oomycota
- Class: Peronosporomycetes
- Order: Peronosporales
- Family: Pythiaceae
- Genus: Pythium
- Species: P. violae

Binomial name
- Pythium violae Chesters & Hickman, (1944)

Species of single-celled organism

Pythium violae is a plant pathogen infecting carrots. It is a soil-borne oomycete that causes the cavity spot disease of carrots. Pythium sulcatum also causes a less serious form of this disease. Pythium violae causes elliptical shaped brown lesions surrounded by a thin yellow halo on the surface of the taproot. These lesions cause a blemished aesthetic appearance on the carrot, reducing their market value while maintaining yield. The lesions are, on average, less than half an inch in diameter and appear near harvest, but can grow as the carrot matures and grow larger on processing varieties of carrots. Low density hyphae are present in early formation of the lesions, but there is little to no presence of Pythium violae spores in the mature lesions making it difficult to diagnose in the field. This disease can be instigated by excessive rainfall, poor soil drainage, cool temperatures, and low Soil pH. Pythium violae has been shown to infect and produce similar necrotic lesions on other hosts such as alfalfa, wheat, and broccoli. However, no economic loss has been reported from these alternate host infections.
