= Pythium volutum =

Scientific classification
- Domain: Eukaryota
- Clade: Sar
- Clade: Stramenopiles
- Phylum: Oomycota
- Class: Peronosporomycetes
- Order: Peronosporales
- Family: Pythiaceae
- Genus: Pythium
- Species: P. volutum

Binomial name
- Pythium volutum Vanterp. & Truscott

Species of single-celled organism

Pythium volutum is a plant pathogen infecting wheat, barley, and turfgrass. It is known to be sensitive to some of the compounds typically present in selective media commonly used for isolating Pythium spp., so isolation may require alternative methods.

== Hosts and symptoms ==
Pythium volutum causes a disease of turf grass. More specifically, Pythium volutum is a pathogen that affects creeping bentgrass. Creeping bentgrass is a turf type that is used in many putting greens on golf courses. The majority of incidents of infection have occurred in the southeastern US. This regional distribution is due to the pathogens ideal environmental conditions. When creeping bentgrass is infected by Pythium volutum, areas of chlorosis, wilt and drought stress can be observed. When an area of the creeping bentgrass is affected, large dead spots in the turf are seen. These symptoms are most often observed in the summer months when soil and surface temperatures are high. Because Pythium volutum is a root rotting pathogen, the ability of the creeping bentgrass to intake water is inhibited. When soil and surface temperatures are high, the plant will display symptoms of wilt and chlorosis, ultimately leading to death. Low fertility, low soil oxygen, and drought stress can increase the appearance of disease symptoms. While symptoms are most prevalent at warmer temperatures with drier conditions, infection occurs at lower temperatures with moister soil conditions.

== Management ==
To combat Pythium volutum there are a few steps that can be taken. Some cultural control steps that can be taken are monitoring irrigation and also increasing drainage through aeration. Because Pythium spp. are water molds, the management of irrigation will lower the risk of infection of the turf. Also, aeration will allow for excess water to exit the area and reduce risk of infection. Removing excess water doesn't allow for spore movement from root to root. Finally, adjusting mow heights will reduce stress on the plant and therefore will make the plants less susceptible to damage by the pathogen. Chemical treatments are another option for management and control. Fungicides can be applied during the infection periods of Pythium volutum to reduce the occurrence of infection of creeping bentgrass. In fact, both cultural and chemical methods of management should be used in tandem for most effective results. Fungicides work by killing the fungi and the fungal spores, effectively managing the disease.

== Disease cycle ==
Beginning with an already infected, dead plant, Pythium volutum enters its sexual stage. In this stage, an oogonium is fertilized by an antheridium. Pythium voultum is usually fertilized by one antheridium, but has been observed being fertilized by as many as four antheridia at a time, which is different from other Pythia spp. After fertilization, an oospore is produced. Oospores are resting structures that allow the pathogen to overwinter in the soil. Once the oospore is formed, the oospore will either begin to produce zoospores or begin to germinate and directly infect new plants itself. Because of this fact, the initial inoculum can be either considered the oospore itself or the zoospores that emerge from the oospore. Dissemination of these spores is reliant on water. Zoospores specifically use water to swim to the host. Once the infectious spores reach the host's root tissue, infection occurs. This infection is a systemic infection resulting in chlorosis, wilting, and ultimately plant death. Before plant death occurs, the infected plants produce structures called sporangia. Sporangia can then be disseminated by the wind, rain, or mechanical factors to reach new hosts. Once the sporangia reach a new, uninfected host, zoospores are released. These zoospores produced by the sporangia again use water and moisture to swim to openings or wounds in the bentgrass. This is different from the initial inoculum because these spores may enter through other plant structures than the root tissue. From this point, the infected plant will eventually die and the pathogen will again overwinter in the oospore structures. Infection of grass occurs in fall and spring. This is when soil temperatures and moisture levels are optimal for spores to infect the roots of plants.
