= Pythium spinosum =

Scientific classification
- Domain: Eukaryota
- Clade: Sar
- Clade: Stramenopiles
- Phylum: Oomycota
- Class: Peronosporomycetes
- Order: Peronosporales
- Family: Pythiaceae
- Genus: Pythium
- Species: P. spinosum

Binomial name
- Pythium spinosum Sawada, (1926)

Species of single-celled organism

Pythium spinosum is a plant pathogen infecting a wide variety of crops. Hosts observed to be infected include rice in Taiwan, Primula, Impatiens, soil in Florida, Cucumis melo in South Korea (as damping off), and soybeans in Arkansas USA, China, and Indiana USA.
