= Diasporangium =

Scientific classification
- Domain: Eukaryota
- Clade: Diaphoretickes
- Clade: SAR
- Clade: Stramenopiles
- Phylum: Oomycota
- Order: Peronosporales
- Family: Pythiaceae
- Genus: Diasporangium; Höhnk, 1936
- Species: D. jonesianum

Binomial name
- Diasporangium jonesianum Höhnk, 1936

Genus of single-celled organisms

Diasporangium is a genus of water moulds. It contains the single species Diasporangium jonesianum, described in 1936 by German mycologist Willy Höhnk. Known from the United States and Germany, where it grows in soil, D. jonesianum can cause root rot in various plants. It has a spherical oogonium up to 25 μm in diameter, with an oospore that almost fills the oogonium.
