= Pythium tardicrescens =

Scientific classification
- Domain: Eukaryota
- Clade: Sar
- Clade: Stramenopiles
- Phylum: Oomycota
- Class: Peronosporomycetes
- Order: Peronosporales
- Family: Pythiaceae
- Genus: Pythium
- Species: P. tardicrescens

Binomial name
- Pythium tardicrescens Vanterp., (1938)

Species of single-celled organism

Pythium tardicrescens is a plant pathogen that infects multiple species of grass. It has been documented in southeastern Washington state.
