= Pythium buismaniae =

Scientific classification
- Domain: Eukaryota
- Clade: Sar
- Clade: Stramenopiles
- Division: Oomycota
- Class: Peronosporomycetes
- Order: Peronosporales
- Family: Pythiaceae
- Genus: Pythium
- Species: P. buismaniae

Binomial name
- Pythium buismaniae Plaäts-Nit., (1981)

Synonyms
- Pythium megalacanthum

Species of single-celled organism

Pythium buismaniae is a plant pathogen infecting Primula.
