= Pythium heterothallicum =

Scientific classification
- Domain: Eukaryota
- Clade: Sar
- Clade: Stramenopiles
- Phylum: Oomycota
- Class: Peronosporomycetes
- Order: Peronosporales
- Family: Pythiaceae
- Genus: Pythium
- Species: P. heterothallicum

Binomial name
- Pythium heterothallicum W.A. Campb. & F.F. Hendrix, (1968)

Species of single-celled organism

Pythium heterothallicum is a plant pathogen infecting spinach.
