= Pythium paddicum =

Scientific classification
- Domain: Eukaryota
- Clade: Sar
- Clade: Stramenopiles
- Phylum: Oomycota
- Class: Peronosporomycetes
- Order: Peronosporales
- Family: Pythiaceae
- Genus: Pythium
- Species: P. paddicum

Binomial name
- Pythium paddicum Hirane, (1960)

Species of single-celled organism

Pythium paddicum is a plant pathogen infecting barley.
