= Kidwan =

Village in Minya Governorate, Egypt

Kidwan كدوان
- Village
- Location in Egypt
- Coordinates: 28.071669°N 30.776199°E
- Country: Egypt
- Governorate: Minya
- Time zone: UTC+2 (EET)
  - Summer (DST): UTC+3 (EEST)

Kidwan (Arabic: كدوان) is a village located in Egypt in the Minya Governorate, due south of the governorate capital, Minya. In 2001, Kidwan's crop of cauliflower grown in the field in town contracted root rot disease, resulting in a loss of the entire crop. The root rot disease had followed from the previous year's crop of wheat, which had contracted a similar damping off disease that was found to be caused by Pythium diclinum.
