= Pythium perniciosum =

Scientific classification
- Domain: Eukaryota
- Clade: Sar
- Clade: Stramenopiles
- Phylum: Oomycota
- Class: Peronosporomycetes
- Order: Peronosporales
- Family: Pythiaceae
- Genus: Pythium
- Species: P. perniciosum

Binomial name
- Pythium perniciosum Serbinow, (1912)

Species of single-celled organism

Pythium perniciosum is a plant pathogen infecting strawberries and poinsettias.
