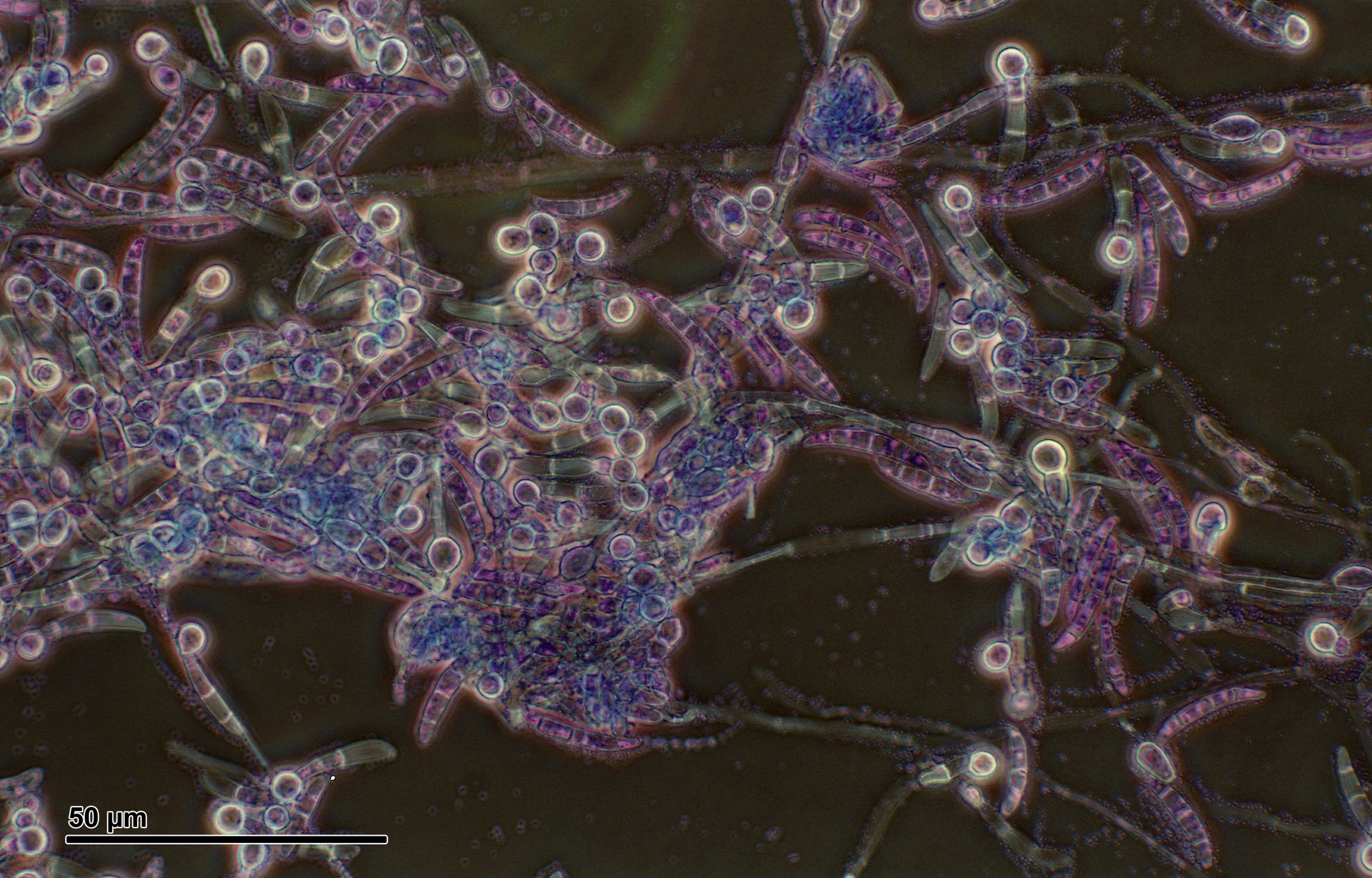
- Negative phase contrast image of Pythium sp.

Scientific classification
- Domain: Eukaryota
- Clade: Sar
- Clade: Stramenopiles
- Phylum: Oomycota
- Class: Peronosporomycetes
- Order: Peronosporales
- Family: Pythiaceae
- Genus: Pythium; Pringsheim, 1858

Species
- See text

= Pythium =

Genus of single-celled organisms

Pythium is a genus of parasitic oomycetes. They were formerly classified as fungi. Most species are plant parasites, but Pythium insidiosum is an important pathogen of animals and human, causing pythiosis. The feet of the fungus gnat are frequently a vector for their transmission.

== Morphology ==
Hyphae
Pythium species, like others in the family Pythiaceae, are usually characterized by their production of coenocytic hyphae without septations.
Oogonia
Generally contain a single oospore.
Antheridia
Contain an elongated and club-shaped antheridium.

== Ecological importance ==
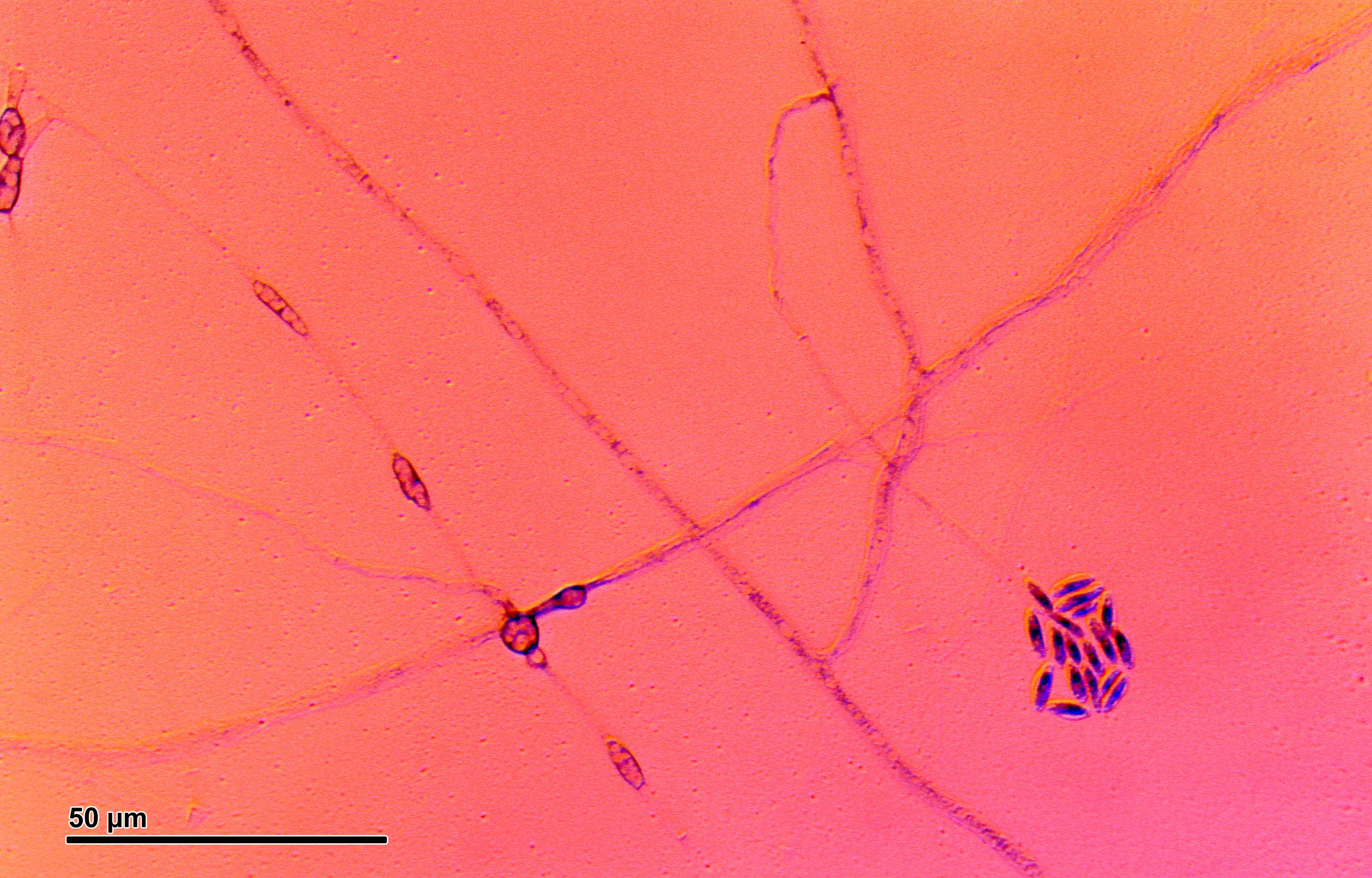
Pythium

Pythium-induced root rot is a common crop disease. When the organism kills newly emerged or emerging seedlings, it is known as damping off, and is a very common problem in fields and greenhouses. Thus there is tremendous interest in genetic host resistance, but no crop has ever developed adequate resistance to Pythium. This disease complex usually involves other pathogens such as Phytophthora and Rhizoctonia. Pythium wilt is caused by zoospore infection of older plants, leading to biotrophic infections that become necrotrophic in response to colonization/reinfection pressures or environmental stress, leading to minor or severe wilting caused by impeded root functioning.

Many Pythium species, along with their close relatives Phytophthora, are plant pathogens of economic importance in agriculture. Pythium spp. tend to be very generalistic and unspecific in their large range of hosts, while Phytophthora spp. are generally more host-specific.

For this reason, Pythium spp. are more devastating in the root rot they cause in crops, because crop rotation alone often does not eradicate the pathogen as Pythium spp. are also good saprotrophs, and survive for a long time on decaying plant matter.

In field crops, damage by Pythium spp. is often limited to the area affected, as the motile zoospores require ample surface water to travel long distances. Additionally, the capillaries formed by soil particles act as a natural filter and effectively trap many zoospores. However, in hydroponic systems inside greenhouses, where extensive monocultures of plants are maintained in plant nutrient solution (containing nitrogen, potassium, phosphate, and micronutrients) that is continuously recirculated to the crop, Pythium spp. cause extensive and devastating root rot and is often difficult to prevent or control. The root rot affects entire operations (tens of thousands of plants, in many instances) within two to four days due to the inherent nature of hydroponic systems where roots are nakedly exposed to the water medium, in which the zoospores can move freely. Various Pythium populations have been known to have resistance to mefenoxam since the 1980s and metalaxyl since 1984.

Several Pythium species, including P. oligandrum, P. nunn, P. periplocum, and P. acanthicum, are mycoparasites of plant pathogenic fungi and oomycetes, and have received interest as potential biocontrol agents.

== Species ==
- Pythium acanthicum
- Pythium acanthophoron
- Pythium acrogynum
- Pythium adhaerens
- Pythium amasculinum
- Pythium anandrum
- Pythium angustatum
- Pythium aphanidermatum
- Pythium apleroticum
- Pythium aquatile
- Pythium aristosporum
- Pythium arrhenomanes
- Pythium attrantheridium
- Pythium bifurcatum
- Pythium boreale
- Pythium buismaniae
- Pythium butleri
- Pythium camurandrum
- Pythium campanulatum
- Pythium canariense
- Pythium capillosum
- Pythium carbonicum
- Pythium carolinianum
- Pythium catenulatum
- Pythium chamaehyphon
- Pythium chondricola
- Pythium citrinum
- Pythium coloratum
- Pythium conidiophorum
- Pythium contiguanum
- Pythium cryptoirregulare
- Pythium cucurbitacearum
- Pythium cylindrosporum
- Pythium cystogenes
- Pythium debaryanum
- Pythium deliense
- Pythium destruens
- Pythium diclinum
- Pythium dimorphum
- Pythium dissimile
- Pythium dissotocum
- Pythium echinulatum
- Pythium emineosum
- Pythium erinaceum
- Pythium flevoense
- Pythium folliculosum
- Pythium glomeratum
- Pythium graminicola
- Pythium grandisporangium
- Pythium guiyangense
- Pythium helicandrum
- Pythium helicoides
- Pythium heterothallicum
- Pythium hydnosporum
- Pythium hypogynum
- Pythium indigoferae
- Pythium inflatum
- Pythium insidiosum
- Pythium intermedium
- Pythium irregulare
- Pythium iwayamae
- Pythium jasmonium
- Pythium kunmingense
- Pythium litorale
- Pythium longandrum
- Pythium longisporangium
- Pythium lutarium
- Pythium macrosporum
- Pythium mamillatum
- Pythium marinum
- Pythium marsipium
- Pythium mastophorum
- Pythium megacarpum
- Pythium middletonii
- Pythium minus
- Pythium monospermum
- Pythium montanum
- Pythium multisporum
- Pythium myriotylum
- Pythium nagaii
- Pythium nodosum
- Pythium nunn
- Pythium oedochilum
- Pythium okanoganense
- Pythium oligandrum
- Pythium oopapillum
- Pythium ornacarpum
- Pythium orthogonon
- Pythium ostracodes
- Pythium pachycaule
- Pythium pachycaule
- Pythium paddicum
- Pythium paroecandrum
- Pythium parvum
- Pythium pectinolyticum
- Pythium periilum
- Pythium periplocum
- Pythium perniciosum
- Pythium perplexum
- Pythium phragmitis
- Pythium pleroticum
- Pythium plurisporium
- Pythium polare
- Pythium polymastum
- Pythium porphyrae
- Pythium prolatum
- Pythium proliferatum
- Pythium pulchrum
- Pythium pyrilobum
- Pythium quercum
- Pythium radiosum
- Pythium ramificatum
- Pythium regulare
- Pythium rhizo-oryzae
- Pythium rhizosaccharum
- Pythium rostratifingens
- Pythium rostratum
- Pythium salpingophorum
- Pythium scleroteichum
- Pythium segnitium
- Pythium spiculum
- Pythium spinosum
- Pythium splendens
- Pythium sterilum
- Pythium stipitatum
- Pythium sulcatum
- Pythium tardicrescens
- Pythium terrestris
- Pythium torulosum
- Pythium tracheiphilum
- Pythium ultimum
  - Pythium ultimum var. ultimum
- Pythium uncinulatum
- Pythium undulatum
- Pythium vanterpoolii
- Pythium viniferum
- Pythium violae
- Pythium volutum
- Pythium zingiberis
- Pythium zingiberum

Globisporangium sylvaticum was formerly placed here as Pythium sylvaticum

== See also ==
- Data related to Pythium at Wikispecies
- Pythium in turfgrass
- Black rot on orchids
