= Pythium tracheiphilum =

Scientific classification
- Domain: Eukaryota
- Clade: Sar
- Clade: Stramenopiles
- Phylum: Oomycota
- Class: Peronosporomycetes
- Order: Peronosporales
- Family: Pythiaceae
- Genus: Pythium
- Species: P. tracheiphilum

Binomial name
- Pythium tracheiphilum Matta, (1965)

Species of single-celled organism

Pythium tracheiphilum is a plant pathogen infecting lettuce.
