= Pythium scleroteichum =

Scientific classification
- Domain: Eukaryota
- Clade: Sar
- Clade: Stramenopiles
- Phylum: Oomycota
- Class: Peronosporomycetes
- Order: Peronosporales
- Family: Pythiaceae
- Genus: Pythium
- Species: P. scleroteichum

Binomial name
- Pythium scleroteichum Drechsler, (1934)

Fungal pathogen

Pythium scleroteichum is a plant pathogen infecting sweet potatoes.

== Genomics ==
P. scleroteichum belongs to Pythium Cluster B1c.
