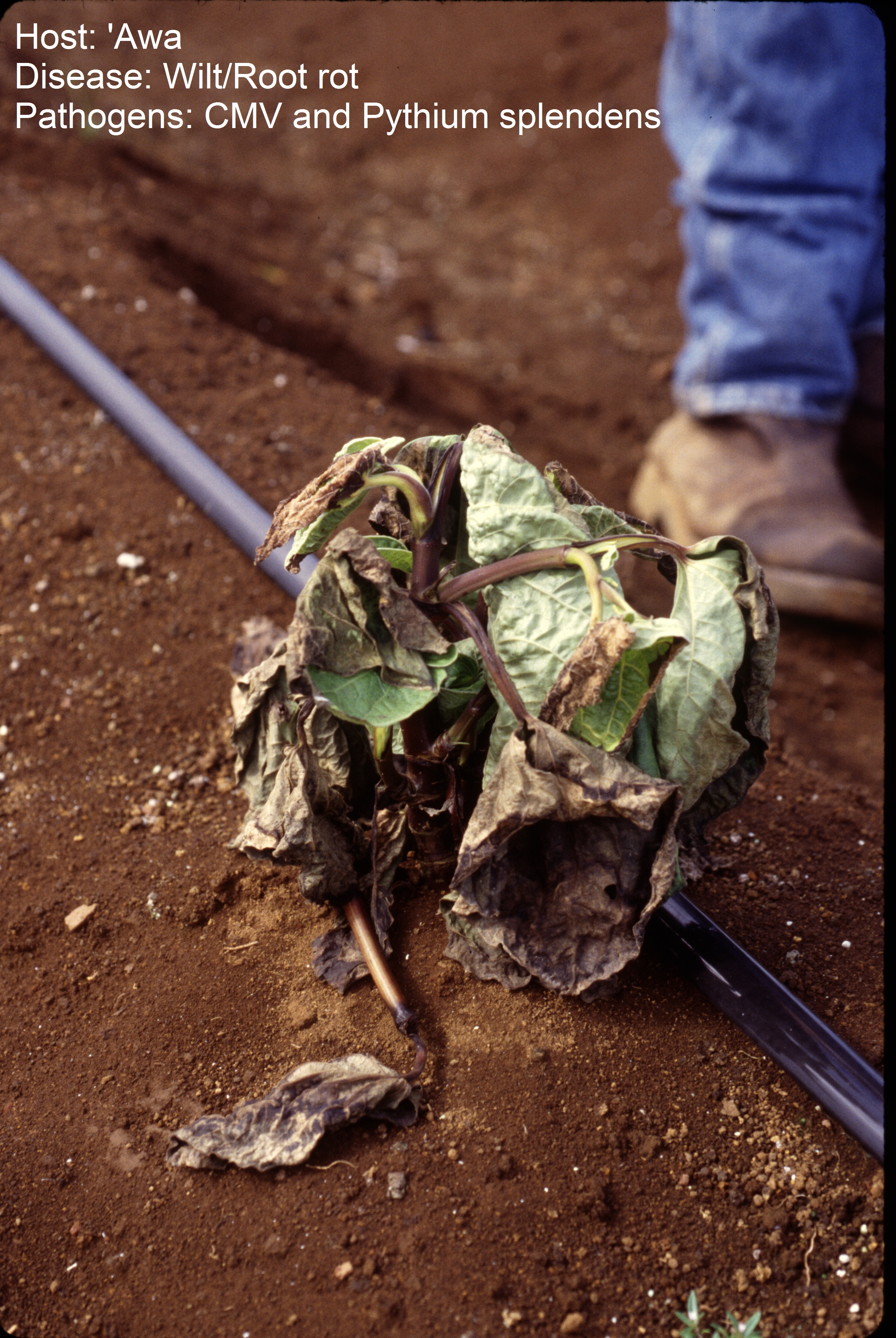
- Pythium splendens causing root rot on kava (Piper methysticum)

Scientific classification
- Domain: Eukaryota
- Clade: Sar
- Clade: Stramenopiles
- Phylum: Oomycota
- Class: Peronosporomycetes
- Order: Peronosporales
- Family: Pythiaceae
- Genus: Pythium
- Species: P. splendens

Binomial name
- Pythium splendens Hans Braun, (1925)

= Pythium splendens =

Species of single-celled organism

Pythium splendens is a plant pathogen. It is a potentially useful organism for the synthesis of large amounts of eicosapentaenoic acid, which is a polyunsaturated fatty acid with a variety of functions that are beneficial to biological systems.
