= Pythium acanthicum =

Scientific classification
- Domain: Eukaryota
- Clade: Sar
- Clade: Stramenopiles
- Phylum: Oomycota
- Class: Peronosporomycetes
- Order: Peronosporales
- Family: Pythiaceae
- Genus: Pythium
- Species: P. acanthicum

Binomial name
- Pythium acanthicum Drechsler, (1930)

Species of single-celled organism

Pythium acanthicum is a plant pathogen infecting strawberries.
