= Pythium iwayamae =

Scientific classification
- Domain: Eukaryota
- Clade: Sar
- Clade: Stramenopiles
- Phylum: Oomycota
- Class: Peronosporomycetes
- Order: Peronosporales
- Family: Pythiaceae
- Genus: Pythium
- Species: P. iwayamae

Binomial name
- Pythium iwayamae S. Ito, (1935)

Species of single-celled organism

Pythium iwayamae is a plant pathogen infecting barley and wheat.
