= Pythium oopapillum =

Scientific classification
- Domain: Eukaryota
- Clade: Sar
- Clade: Stramenopiles
- Division: Oomycota
- Class: Peronosporomycetes
- Order: Peronosporales
- Family: Pythiaceae
- Genus: Pythium
- Species: P. oopapillum

Binomial name
- Pythium oopapillum Bala et al., 2010

Species of single-celled organism

Pythium oopapillum is a plant pathogen, first isolated in Canada.
