= Pythium arrhenomanes =

Scientific classification
- Domain: Eukaryota
- Clade: Sar
- Clade: Stramenopiles
- Phylum: Oomycota
- Class: Peronosporomycetes
- Order: Peronosporales
- Family: Pythiaceae
- Genus: Pythium
- Species: P. arrhenomanes

Binomial name
- Pythium arrhenomanes Drechsler, (1928)

Synonyms
- Nematosporangium aphanidermatum var. hawaiiensis Nematosporangium arrhenomanes Nematosporangium epiphanosporon Nematosporangium hyphalosticton Nematosporangium leiohyphon Nematosporangium leucosticton Nematosporangium polyandron Nematosporangium rhizophthoron Nematosporangium spaniogamon Nematosporangium thysanohyphalon Pythium arrhenomanes var. canadense Pythium arrhenomanes var. philippinensis

Species of single-celled organism

Pythium arrhenomanes is a plant pathogen.
