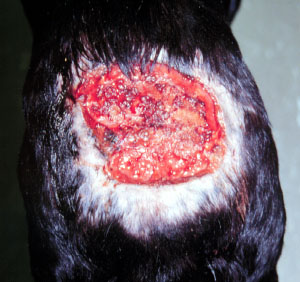
- Ulcerative and destructive skin lesion in a dog caused by Pythium insidiosum

Scientific classification
- Domain: Eukaryota
- Supergroup: Stramenopiles
- Division: Oomycota
- Class: Peronosporomycetes
- Order: Peronosporales
- Family: Pythiaceae
- Genus: Pythium
- Species: P. insidiosum

Binomial name
- Pythium insidiosum De Cock, L.Mend., A.A.Padhye, Ajello & Kaufman

= Pythium insidiosum =

Species of single-celled organism

Pythium insidiosum is a species of Pythium and a member of the class Oomycota. Pythium insidiosum is mainly found in standing water and occasionally soil. Unlike most Pythium species, which are generally pathogens of terrestrial plants, Pythium insidiosum is a pathogen of mammals. It causes pythiosis, mainly in horses, dogs, and humans. It can also cause disease in cats. It is a non-transmissible disease and occurs mainly in tropical climate, endemic to Thailand, affecting mainly humans and horses and in Brazil. Infection can occur in healthy mammals. The pathogen is well-adapted to mammalian body temperature, with an optimum temperature for growth of 34–36 °C (93–97 °F).

The cell walls of Pythium insidiosum are composed of β-glucans and cellulose (compared to the chitin walls of fungi), and their cytoplasmic membranes lack sterols, molecules that are targets of antifungals. For this reason, infection caused by Pythium insidiosum is often difficult to treat.
