= P. porphyrae =

P. porphyrae can refer to two different species. The specific epithet porphyrae (πορφυρα) means 'purplish-red.'

- Polaribacter porphyrae, a bacteria in the family Flavobacteriaceae
- Pontisma porphyrae, a oomycete in the family Pontismataceae
- Pythium porphyrae, a oomycete in the family Pythiaceae that causes red rot disease in many edible seaweeds
