= Pythium deliense =

Scientific classification
- Domain: Eukaryota
- Clade: Sar
- Clade: Stramenopiles
- Phylum: Oomycota
- Class: Peronosporomycetes
- Order: Peronosporales
- Family: Pythiaceae
- Genus: Pythium
- Species: P. deliense

Binomial name
- Pythium deliense Meurs, (1934)

Synonyms
- Pythium indicum M.S. Balakr., (1948)

Species of single-celled organism

Pythium deliense is a plant pathogen infecting potato and beet.
