= Pythium in turfgrass =

Pythium disease, also known as "Pythium blight," "cottony blight," or "grease spot," is a highly destructive turfgrass disease caused by several different Pythium species. All naturally cultivated cool-season turfgrasses are susceptible to Pythium and if conditions are favorable to Pythium it can destroy a whole turfgrass stand in a few days or less. Pythium favors hot and very humid weather and will usually develop in low areas or swales in the turfgrass.

== Symptoms ==
Pythium symptoms will first appear as small, irregularly shaped spots that are 1/2" to 4" inches in diameter and will join to form large patches that will often be long streaks. Pythium often develops into these streaks because it is the direction of water movement (drainage) most often ruts from golf carts and mowing equipment. The turfgrass leaves will at first look and feel water-soaked, greasy, or slimy. Once dew or moisture dries up the blade will shrivel up and collapse, often causing a matted brown turf. The turfgrass will begin to develop patches that fade to a light brown or gray color. With high humidity in early morning or throughout the day, diseased leaves may be covered with the white, cobwebby, mold like growth of the causal fungus, known as mycelium.

== Disease cycle ==
Pythium may survive in the soil for extended periods of time, often coming from debris from past infected plants or spores living in the soil. Pythium spreads by the movement and growth of mycelium and spores from plant to plant. Pythium thrives in hot and humid weather typically day temperatures of 80 °F to 95 °F in areas that have little air movement but high moisture content. In lower temperatures of 55 °F to 65 °F and extended periods of wet weather Pythium is still prevalent. Pythium will most commonly appear during the "150 rule", which is when the sum of the average nighttime temperature and average relative humidity is greater than or equal to 150 °F (66 °C). Pythium is most common when dew remains on the grass blade for 14 hours or more. Turf stands that have excess nitrogen and lush growth are very vulnerable to Pythium and will spread rapidly due to high nitrogen levels. Alkaline soils (above a pH of 7) and calcium deficient soils also tend to favor Pythium. Pythium survives over winter as oospores found in the soil. The pathogen therefore is easily spread with the movement of diseased plants, soil movement, surface water, or even from shoes. Pythium also causes "Damping off", "seed decay", or "seedling blight" of turfgrasses. This is most common in Perennial ryegrass (Lolium perenne) and happens in areas that are high above the recommended seeding rates. Not only does Pythium devastate the Turf canopy but the oomycete can also attack the roots and crowns, which will reduce growth, become off-colored, and cause thinning of turf.

== Cultural control ==
Kentucky bluegrass and Fescue are less susceptible to Pythium blight than Perennial ryegrass and Bentgrass. Creating an environment that includes adequate drainage, good air movement, and balanced fertility will help prevent the disease. Removing dew during hot and humid weather will also help prevent Pythium. Dew can be removed from the grass from mowing, using a backpack blower, or dragging a hose across the grass. Install an internal drainage system if you have severe drainage problems. Improve air circulation (Installing fans, removing trees or shrubs) and avoid irrigation practices that will leave moisture on the grass blades for extended periods of time. An adequate aeration program will relieve compaction and improve drainage. Aeration should annually disrupt between 15 and 20% of the total surface area. Be sure that you are not applying excess nitrogen to your soil. Avoid using quick release fertilizers, try using slow release ammonium sources. If your soil pH is above 6.5 then use ammonium sulfate, which will acidify your soil. Most balanced fertility programs for Kentucky Bluegrass lawns will consist of applying 2–5 pounds (0.91–2.27 kg) of nitrogen per 1,000 square feet (93 m^{2}) a year.

== Chemical control ==
If severe enough or on high valued turf (ex. golf greens) Pythium can be controlled with the use of fungicides. To stop the spread of Pythium in bentgrass and perennial ryegrass will most often have to involve a fungicide. Timing is critical to prevent or stop the spread of Pythium, if continued hot, wet weather is expected, apply fungicides at the first sign of symptoms. Preventative fungicide applications may be applied if necessary. Fungicides should be applied according to the instructions on the label. Minimize the cost of applying fungicides by selecting fungicides that will work on a wide range of turfgrass diseases at the same time.
