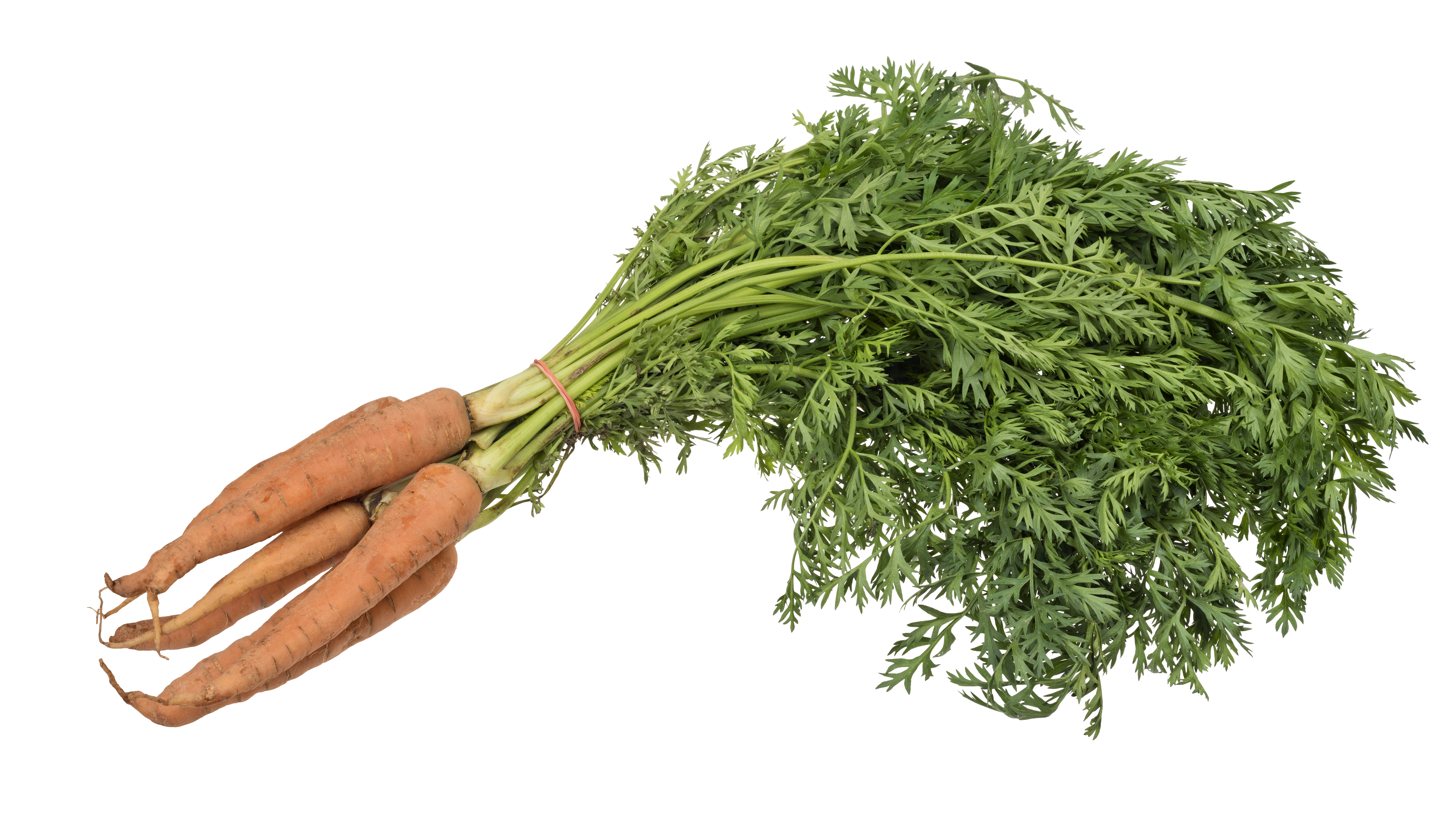

Scientific classification
- Kingdom: Plantae
- Clade: Tracheophytes
- Clade: Angiosperms
- Clade: Eudicots
- Clade: Asterids
- Order: Apiales
- Family: Apiaceae
- Genus: Daucus
- Species: D. carota
- Subspecies: D. c. subsp. sativus

Trinomial name
- Daucus carota subsp. sativus (Hoffm.) Schübl. & G. Martens

Synonyms
- Carota sativa (Hoffm.) Rupr.; Daucus sativus (Hoffm.) Röhl. ex Pass.

= Carrot =

Root vegetable

The carrot (Daucus carota subsp. sativus) is a root vegetable in the umbellifer family Apiaceae. Carrots are typically orange in colour due to their beta-carotene content, which makes them a rich source of vitamin A. Heirloom variants may be white, yellow, red, purple, or black. They are biennial plants.

The vegetable is a domesticated form of the wild carrot, native to Europe and Southwestern Asia. The domesticated plant probably originated in Iran where it was cultivated for its leaves and seeds. In 2022, world production of carrots (combined with turnips) topped 42 million tonnes, with China producing 44% of the total.

During the Second World War, a myth that carrots help people see in the dark was spread as propaganda to explain British pilots' ability to fight in the dark; the real explanation was the introduction of radar.

== Etymology ==
The word is first recorded in English around 1530, borrowed from the Middle French carotte, itself from the Latin carōta, from the ancient Greek καρωτόν (karōtón), originally from the Proto-Indo-European root *ker- ('horn'), due to its horn-like shape. In Old English, the word moru, more (compare German Möhre) was used for both carrots and parsnips, which at the time were both "of whitish colour, thin and rather woody". The word's use as a colour name in English was first recorded around 1670, originally referring to yellowish-red hair.

== Description ==
Daucus carota is a biennial plant. In the first year, energy is stored in the taproot to enable the plant to flower in its second year.

Carrots in a range of colors

Soon after germination, carrot seedlings show a distinct demarcation between taproot and stem: the stem is thicker and lacks lateral roots. At the upper end of the stem is the seed leaf. The first true leaf appears about 10–15 days after germination. Subsequent leaves are alternate (with a single leaf attached to a node), spirally arranged, and pinnately compound, with leaf bases sheathing the stem. As the plant grows, the bases of the seed leaves, near the taproot, are pushed apart. The stem, located just above the ground, is compressed and the internodes are not distinct. When the seed stalk elongates for flowering, the tip of the stem narrows and becomes pointed, and the stem extends upward to become a highly branched inflorescence up to 60–200 cm (20–80 in) tall.

Most of the taproot consists of a pulpy outer cortex (phloem) and an inner core (xylem). High-quality carrots have a large proportion of cortex compared to core. Although a carrot completely lacking xylem is not possible, some cultivars have small and deeply pigmented cores; the taproot can appear to lack a core when the colour of the cortex and core are similar in intensity. Taproots are typically long and conical, although cylindrical and nearly spherical cultivars are available. The root diameter can range from 1 cm (3/8 in) to as much as 10 cm (4 in) at the widest part. The root length ranges from 5 to 50 cm (2 to 20 in), although most are between 10 and 25 cm (4 and 10 in).

Flower development begins when the flat meristem changes from producing leaves to an uplifted, conical meristem capable of producing stem elongation and a cluster of flowers. The cluster is a compound umbel, and each umbel contains several smaller umbels (umbellets). The first (primary) umbel occurs at the end of the main floral stem; smaller secondary umbels grow from the main branch, and these further branch into third, fourth, and even later-flowering umbels.

A large, primary umbel can contain up to 50 umbellets, each of which may have as many as 50 flowers; subsequent umbels have fewer flowers. Individual flowers are small and white, sometimes with a light green or yellow tint. They consist of five petals, five stamens, and an entire calyx. The stamens usually split and fall off before the stigma becomes receptive to receive pollen. The stamens of the brown, male, sterile flowers degenerate and shrivel before the flower fully opens. In the other type of male sterile flower, the stamens are replaced by petals, and these petals do not fall off. A nectar-containing disc is present on the upper surface of the carpels.

Flowers change sex in their development, so the stamens release their pollen before the stigma of the same flower is receptive. The arrangement is centripetal, meaning the oldest flowers are near the edge and the youngest flowers are in the center. Flowers usually first open at the outer edge of the primary umbel, followed about a week later on the secondary umbels, and then in subsequent weeks in higher-order umbels.

The usual flowering period of individual umbels is 7 to 10 days, so a plant can be in the process of flowering for 30–50 days. The distinctive umbels and floral nectaries attract pollinating insects. After fertilization and as seeds develop, the outer umbellets of an umbel bend inward causing the umbel shape to change from slightly convex or fairly flat to concave, and when cupped it resembles a bird's nest.

The fruit that develops is a schizocarp consisting of two mericarps; each mericarp is a true seed. The paired mericarps are easily separated when they are dry. Premature separation (shattering) before harvest is undesirable because it can result in seed loss. Mature seeds are flattened on the commissural side that faced the septum of the ovary. The flattened side has five longitudinal ribs. The bristly hairs that protrude from some ribs are usually removed by abrasion during milling and cleaning. Seeds also contain oil ducts and canals. Seeds vary somewhat in size, ranging from less than 500 to more than 1000 seeds per gram.

The carrot is a diploid species, and has nine relatively short, uniform-length chromosomes (2n=18). The genome size is estimated to be 473 mega base pairs, which is four times larger than Arabidopsis thaliana, one-fifth the size of the maize genome, and about the same size as the rice genome.

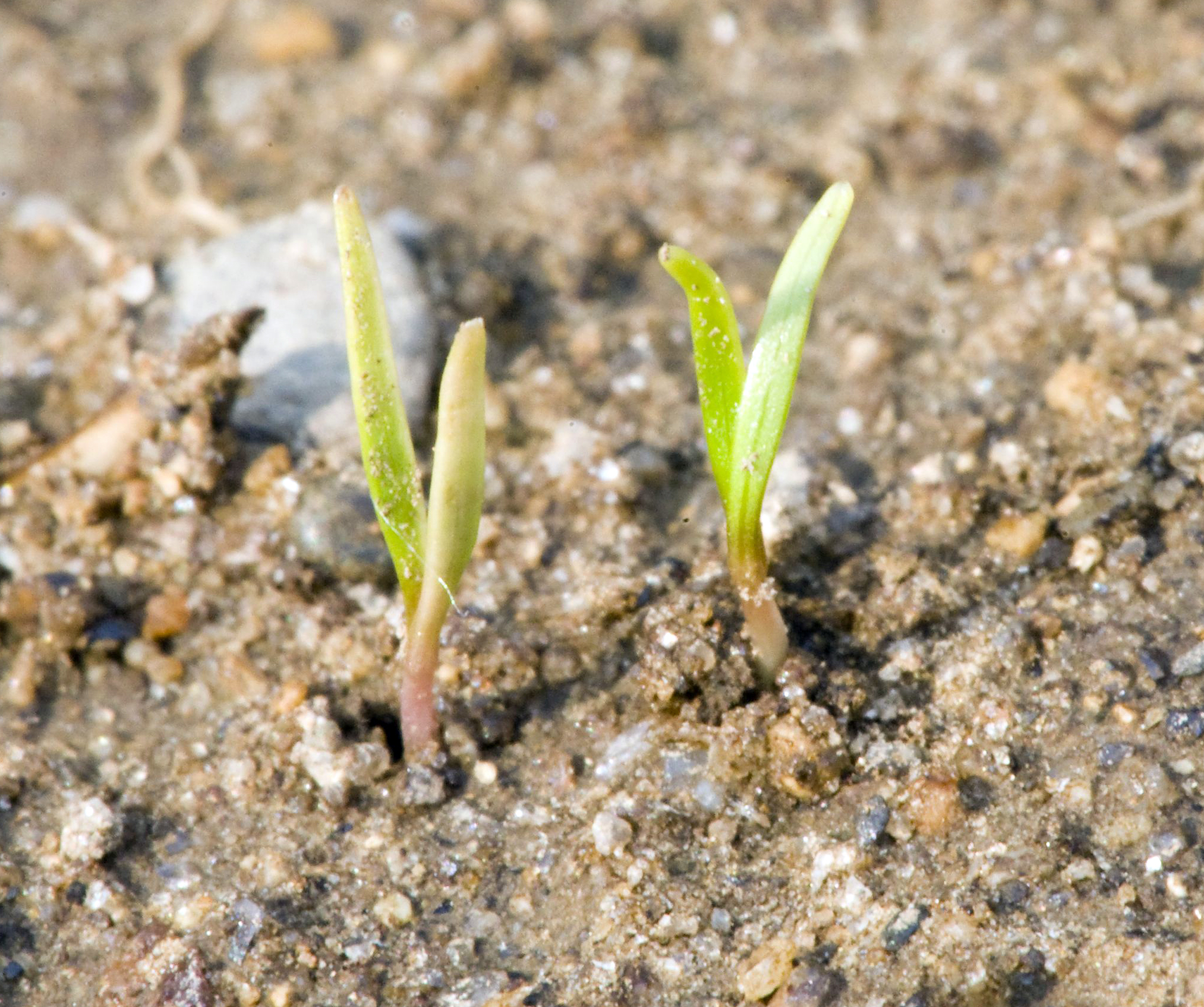
Seedlings shortly after germination

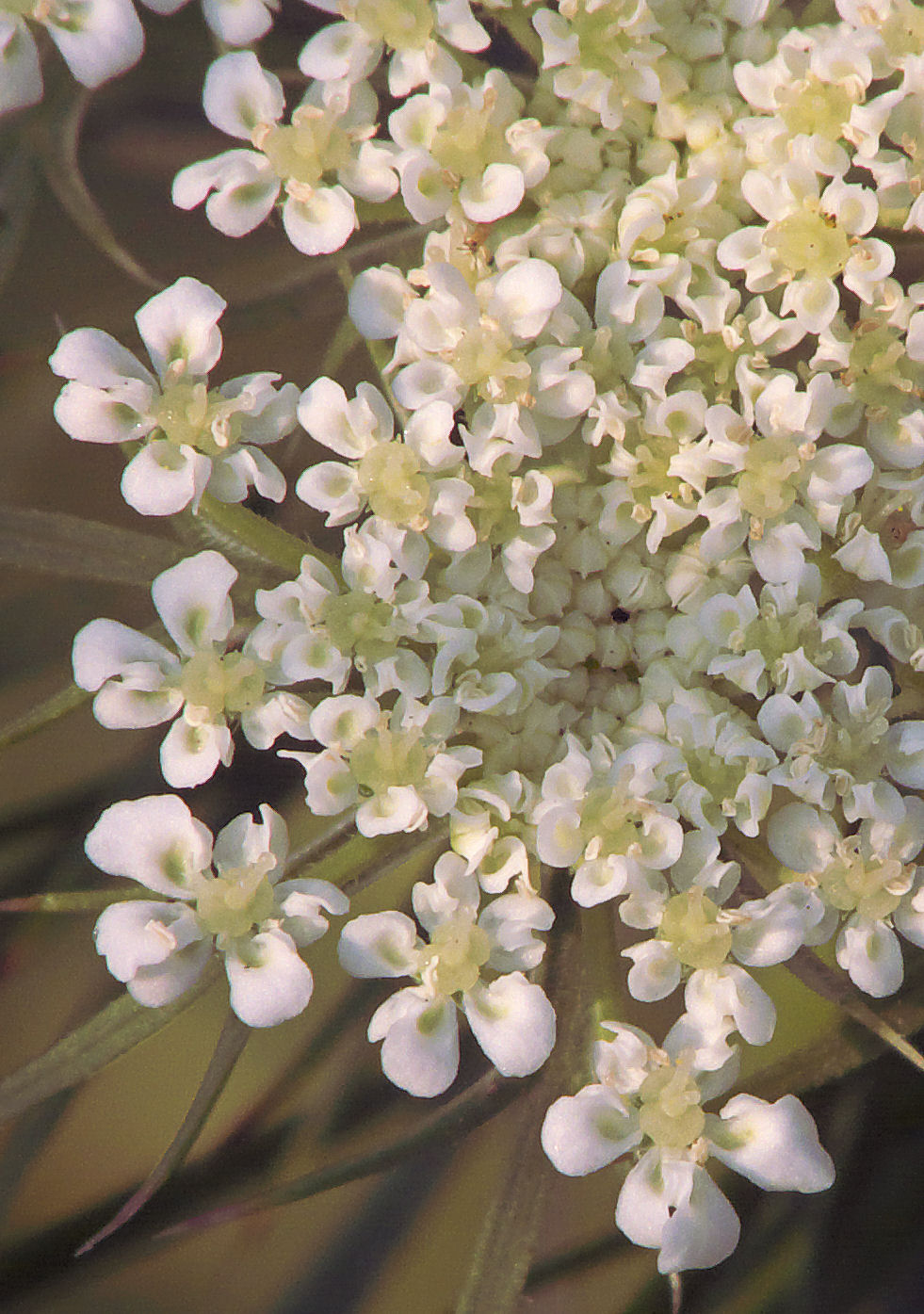
The flowers have five petals, five stamens, and an entire calyx.

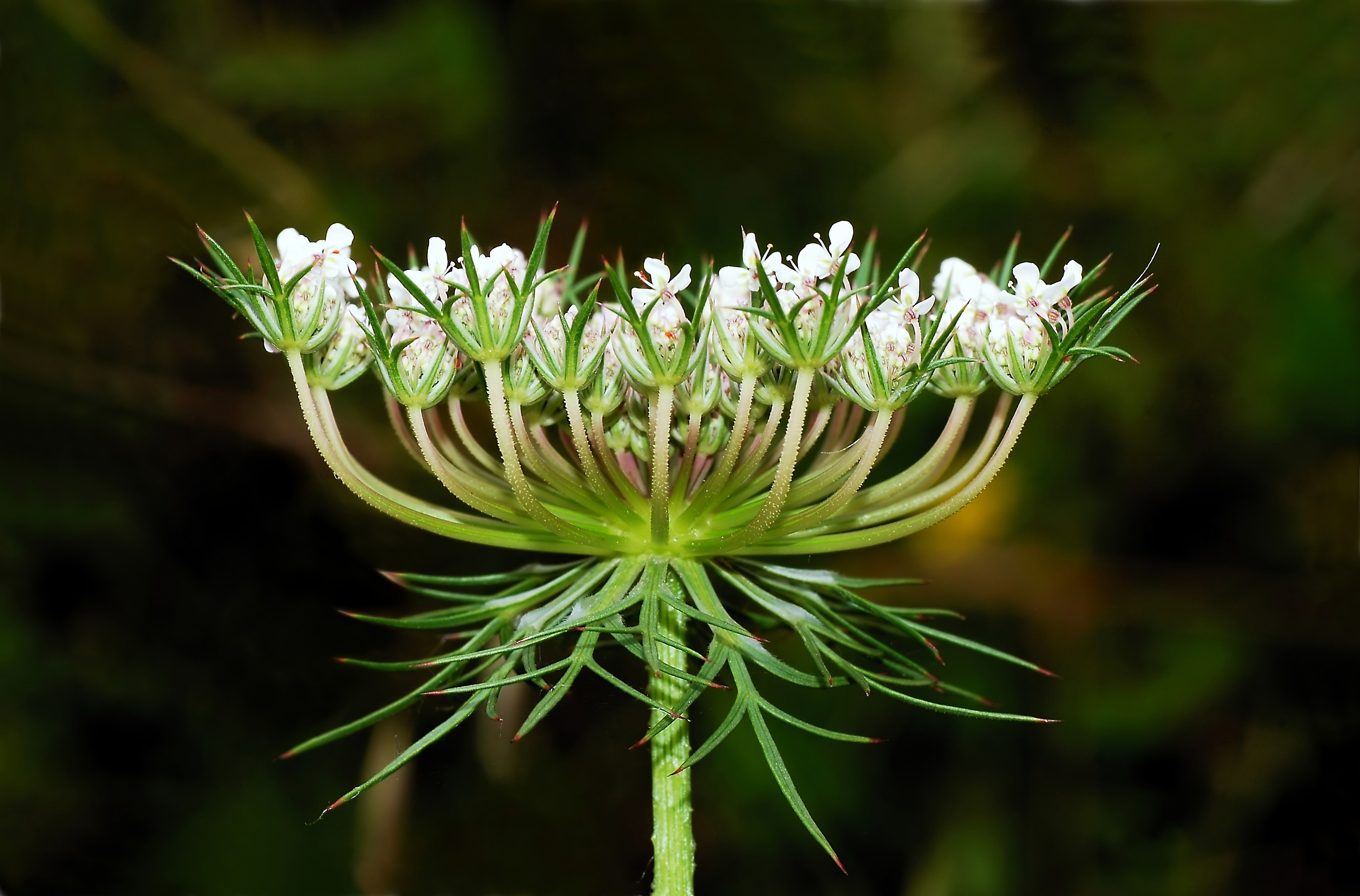
Umbel (inflorescence). Individual flowers are borne on undivided pedicels from a common node.

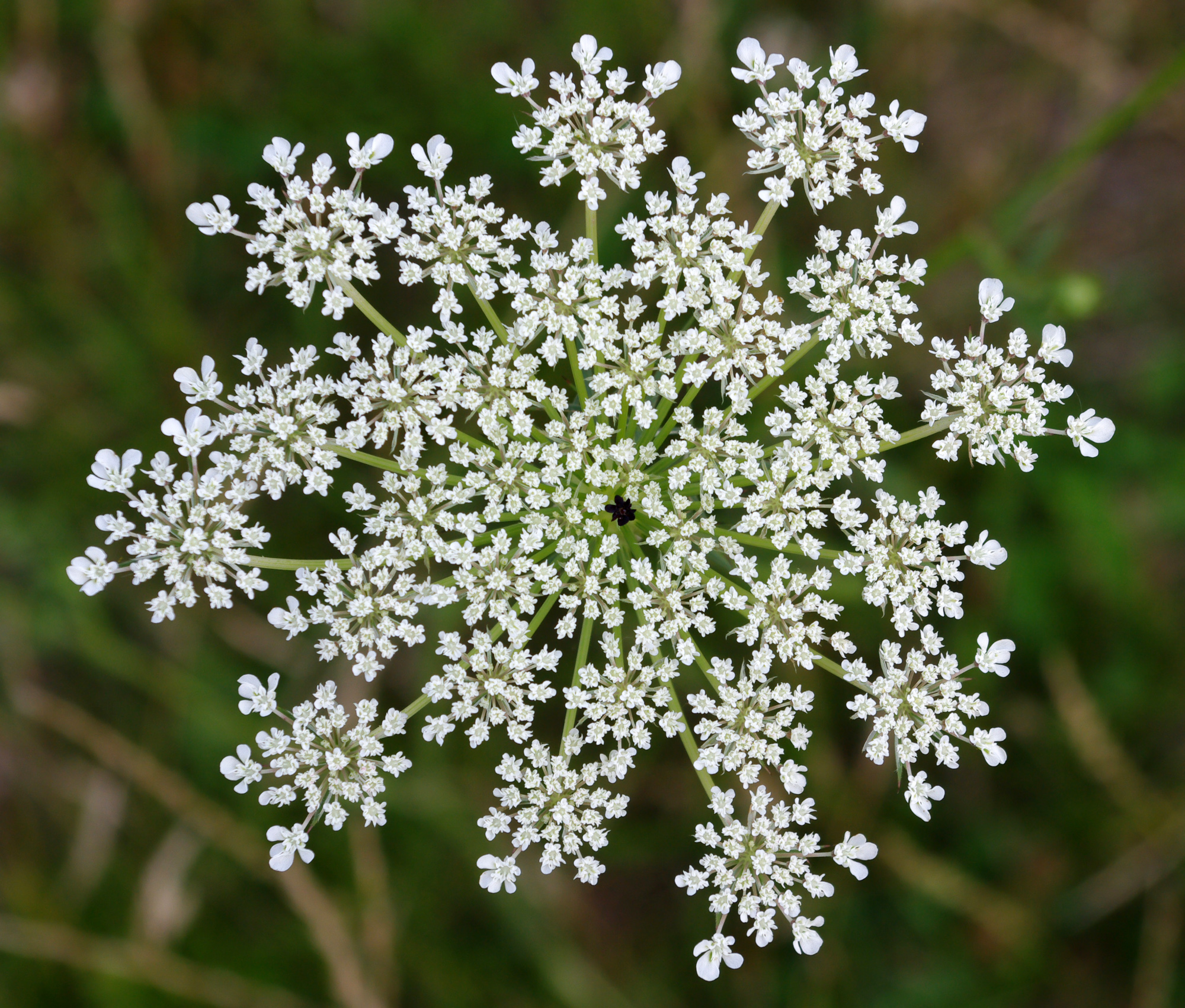
Top view of inflorescence, showing umbellets; the central flower is dark red.

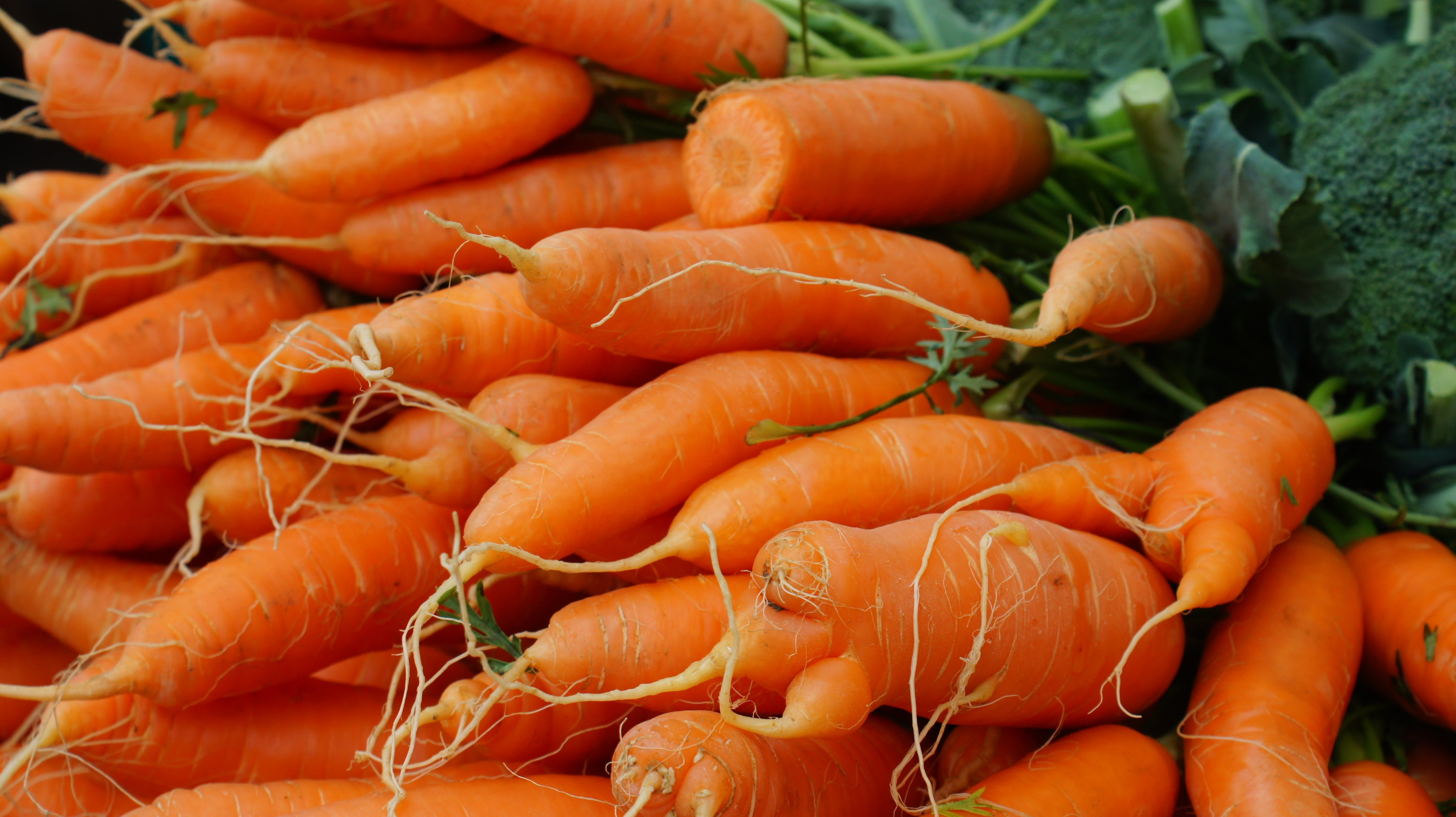
Roots at market

=== Chemistry ===
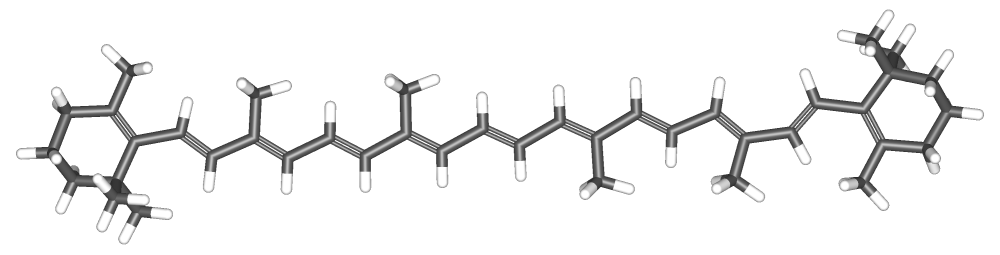
β-Carotene structure. Carotene is responsible for the orange colour of carrots.

Polyacetylenes can be found in Apiaceae vegetables like carrots where they show cytotoxic activities. Falcarinol and falcarindiol (cis-heptadeca-1,9-diene-4,6-diyne-3,8-diol) are such compounds. This latter compound shows antifungal activity towards Mycocentrospora acerina and Cladosporium cladosporioides. Falcarindiol is the main compound responsible for bitterness in carrots.

Other compounds include pyrrolidine present in the leaves and 6-hydroxymellein.

== Cultivation ==
=== Taxonomic history ===
Both written history and molecular genetic studies indicate that the domestic carrot has a single origin in Central Asia. Its wild ancestors probably originated in Greater Persia, which remains the centre of diversity for the wild carrot. Carl Linnaeus described the wild species as Daucus carota in 1753 in his Species Plantarum. Wild carrots were presumably bred selectively in the region of origin over the centuries to reduce bitterness, increase sweetness and minimise the woody core. This process produced the familiar garden vegetable.

The domestic carrot is classified as its own subspecies D. carota subsp. sativus, the accepted name published by Gustav Schübler and Georg Matthias von Martens in Flora Würtemberg, 1834. It has 3 synonyms, Carota sativa (Franz Josef Ruprecht in Flora Ingrica, 1860); Daucus carota var sativus (Georg Franz Hoffmann in Deutsche Flora, Botanisches Taschenbuch, 1791); and Daucus sativus (proposed by Johann Christoph Röhling, published by Giovanni Passerini in Flora Parma, 1852).

=== History ===
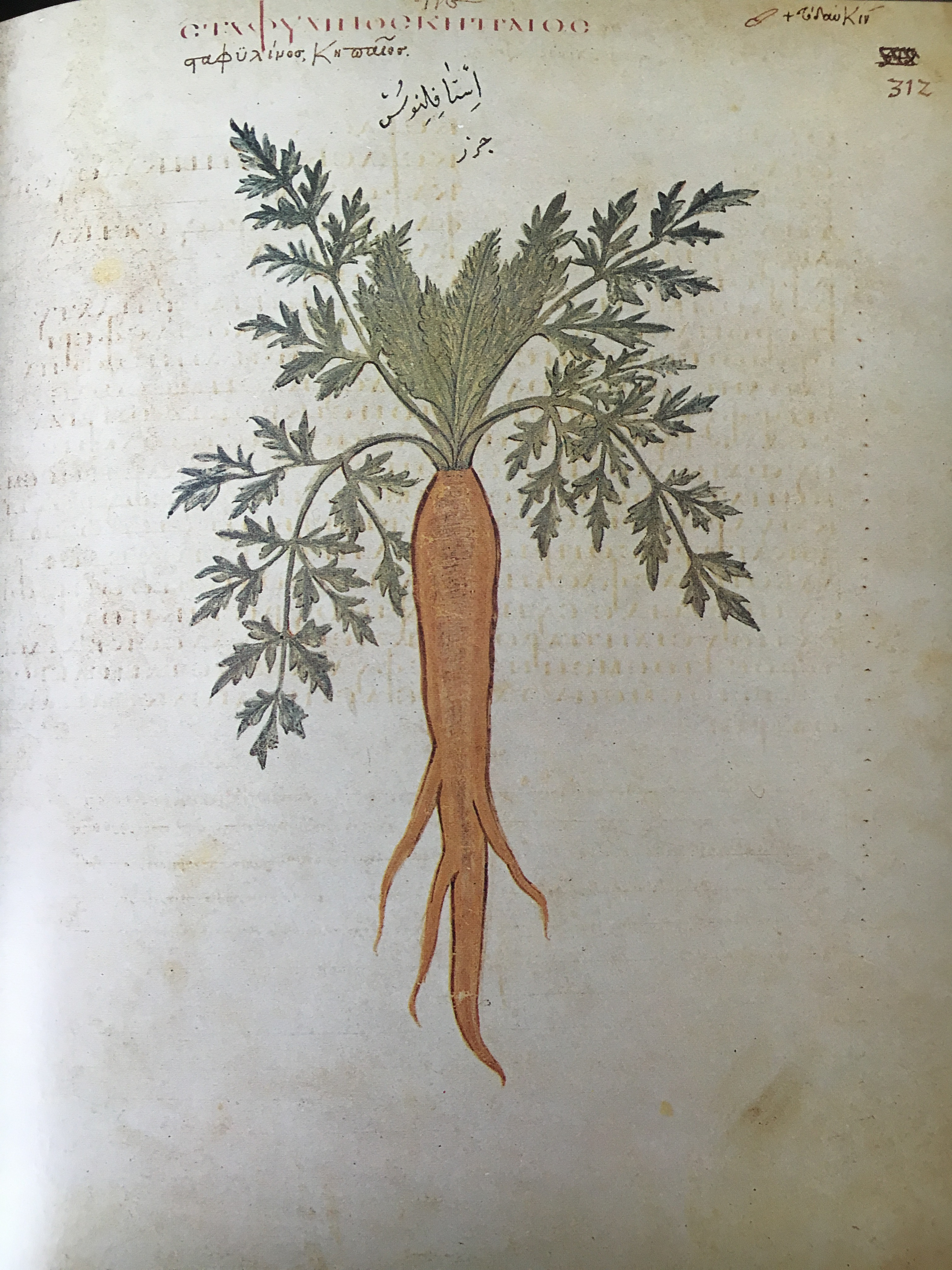
A "garden" carrot from the Juliana Anicia Codex, a 6th-century AD copy of Dioscorides' 1st-century pharmacopoeia. The facing page states that "the root can be cooked and eaten."

When first cultivated, carrots were grown for their aromatic leaves and seeds rather than their roots. Carrot seeds have been found in Switzerland and Southern Germany dating back to 2000–3000 BC. Some close relatives of the carrot are still grown for their leaves and seeds, such as parsley, coriander (cilantro), fennel, anise, dill and cumin. The first mention of the root in classical sources is from the 1st century AD; the Romans ate a root vegetable called pastinaca, which may have been the carrot or the closely related parsnip.

The plant is depicted and described in the Eastern Roman Juliana Anicia Codex, a 6th-century AD Constantinopolitan copy of the Greek physician Dioscorides' 1st-century pharmacopoeia of herbs and medicines, De Materia Medica. The text states that "the root can be cooked and eaten". Another copy of this work, the Codex Neapolitanus from the late 6th or early 7th century, has basically the same illustrations but with roots in purple.

The plant was introduced into Spain by the Moors in the 8th century. In the 10th century, roots from West Asia, India and Europe were purple. The modern carrot originated in Afghanistan at about this time. The 11th-century Jewish scholar Simeon Seth describes both red and yellow carrots, as does the 12th-century Arab-Andalusian agriculturist, Ibn al-'Awwam. Cultivated carrots appeared in China in the 12th century, and in Japan in the 16th or 17th century.

The orange carrot was created by Dutch growers. There is pictorial evidence that the orange carrot existed at least in 512 AD, but it is probable that it was not a stable variety until the Dutch bred the cultivar termed the "Long Orange" at the start of the 18th century. Some claim that the Dutch created the orange carrots to honor the Dutch flag at the time and William of Orange, but other authorities argue these claims lack convincing evidence and it is possible that the orange carrot was favoured by the Europeans because it does not brown soups and stews as the purple carrot does and, as such, was more visually attractive.

Modern carrots were described at about this time by the English antiquary John Aubrey (1626–1697): "Carrots were first sown at Beckington in Somersetshire. Some very old Man there [in 1668] did remember their first bringing hither." European settlers introduced the carrot to colonial America in the 17th century.

=== Propagation ===
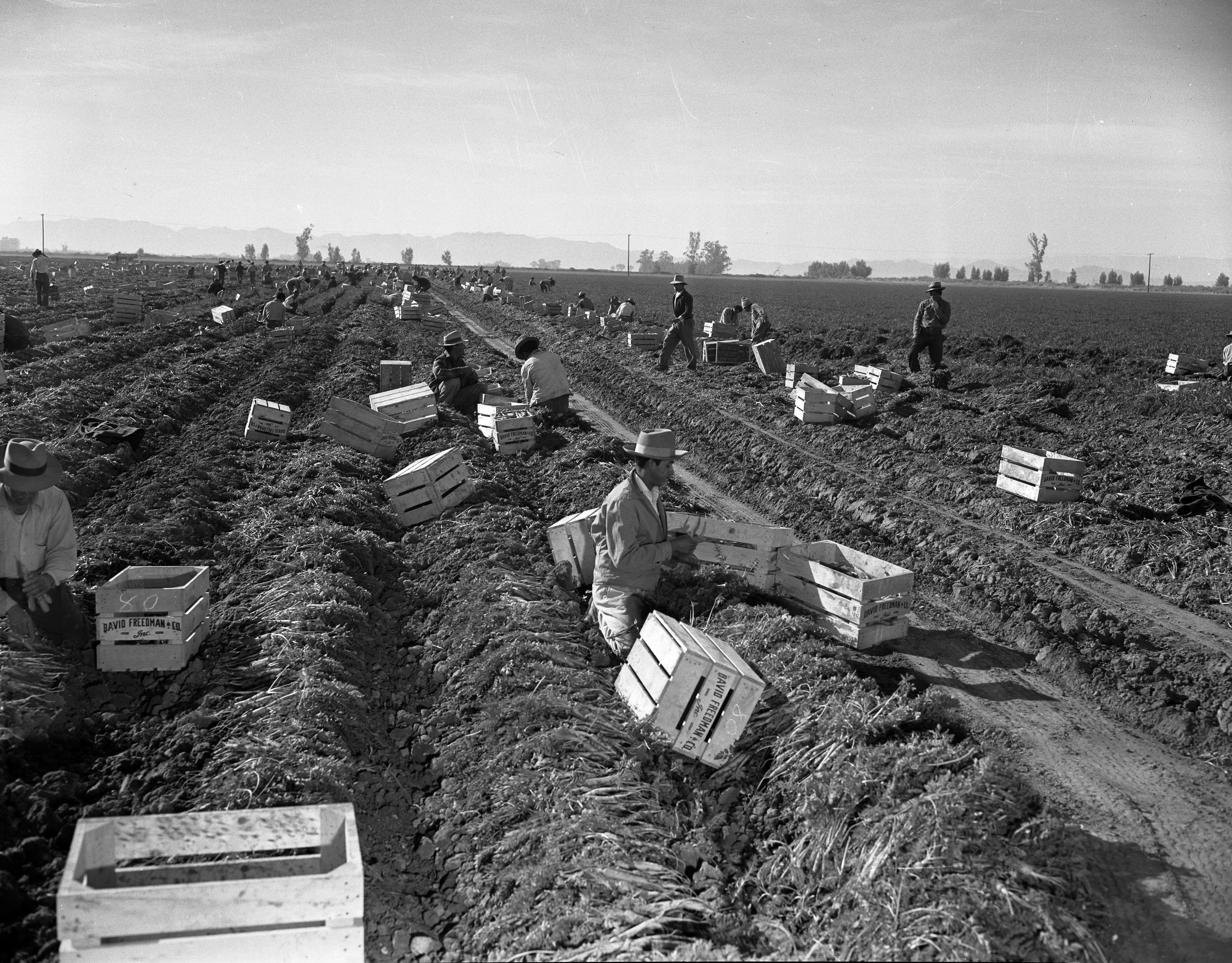
Workers harvesting carrots by hand, Imperial Valley, California, 1948

Carrots are grown from seed and can take up to four months (120 days) to mature, but most cultivars mature within 70 to 80 days under the right conditions. They grow best in full sun but tolerate some shade. The optimum temperature is 16 to 21 °C (61 to 70 °F). The ideal soil is deep, loose and well-drained, sandy or loamy, with a pH of 6.3 to 6.8.

Fertilizer should be applied according to soil type because the crop requires low levels of nitrogen, moderate phosphate and high potash. Rich or rocky soils should be avoided, as these will cause the roots to become hairy and/or misshapen. Irrigation is applied when needed to keep the soil moist. After sprouting, the crop is eventually thinned to a spacing of 8 to 10 cm (3 to 4 in) and weeded to prevent competition beneath the soil.

=== Pests and diseases ===
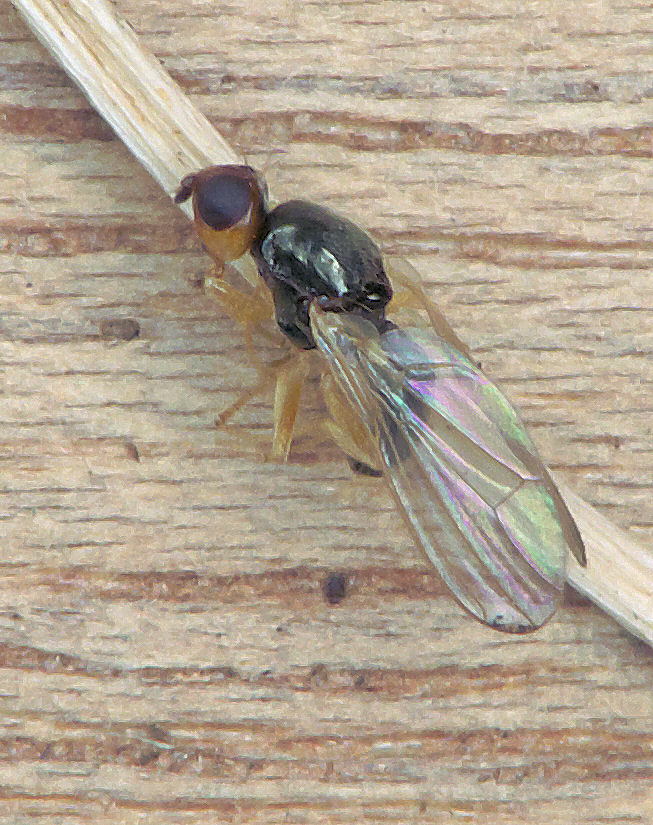
The carrot fly is a pest of carrot crops.

Among pests of carrot crops is the carrot fly (Chamaepsila rosae), a dipteran fly in the family Psilidae. Its maggot larvae eat the outside of the root, damaging the crop.

There are several diseases that can reduce the yield and market value of carrots. The most devastating carrot disease is Alternaria leaf blight, which has been known to eradicate entire crops. A bacterial leaf blight caused by Xanthomonas campestris can also be destructive in warm, humid areas. Root knot nematodes (Meloidogyne species) can cause stubby or forked roots, or galls. Cavity spot, caused by the oomycetes Pythium violae and Pythium sulcatum, results in irregularly shaped, depressed lesions on the taproots.

Physical damage can also reduce the value of carrot crops. The two main forms of damage are splitting, whereby a longitudinal crack develops during growth that can be a few centimetres to the entire length of the root, and breaking, which occurs postharvest. These disorders can affect over 30% of commercial crops. Factors associated with high levels of splitting include wide plant spacing, early sowing, lengthy growth durations, and genotype.

Carrots can be good companions for other plants; if left to flower, the carrot, like any umbellifer, attracts predatory wasps that kill many garden pests.

=== Cultivars ===
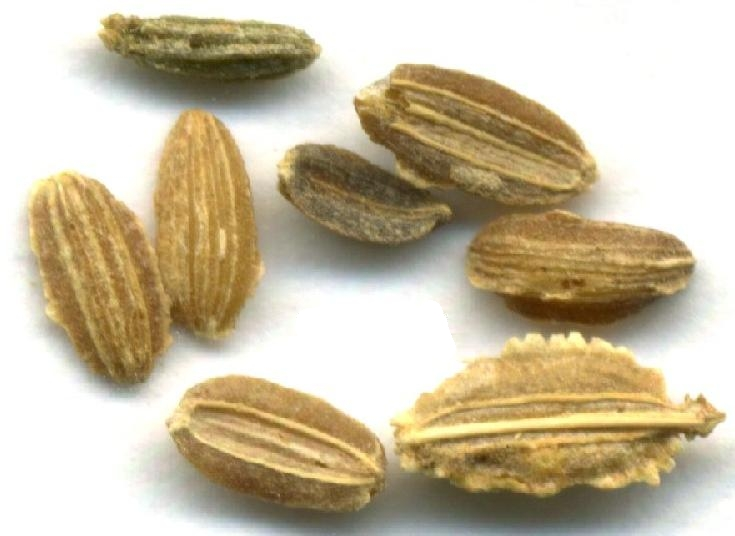
Carrot seeds

Carrot cultivars can be grouped into two broad classes: "Eastern" carrots and "Western" carrots. A number of novelty cultivars have been bred for particular characteristics.

"Eastern" (a European and American continent reference) carrots were domesticated in Persia (probably in the lands of modern-day Iran and Afghanistan within West Asia) during the 10th century, or possibly earlier. Specimens of the Eastern carrot that survive to the present day are commonly purple or yellow, and often have branched roots. The purple colour common in these carrots comes from anthocyanin pigments.

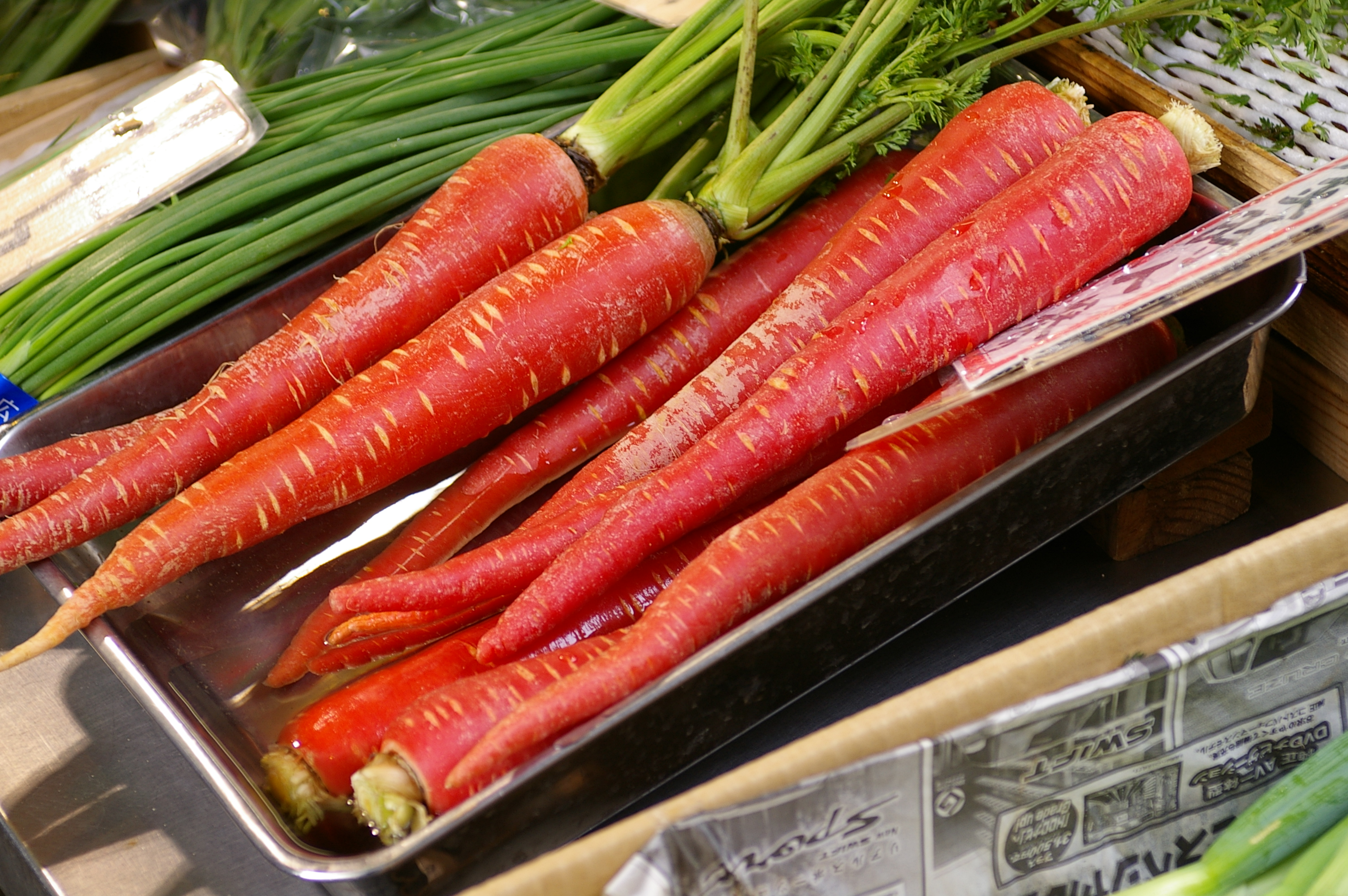
Kintoki carrots, a Japanese cultivar from Kyoto Prefecture

The "Western" carrot emerged in the Netherlands in the 16th or 17th century. There is a popular claim that its orange colour made it popular in those countries as an emblem of the House of Orange and the struggle for Dutch independence, although there is little evidence for this beyond oral tradition and the timing.

Western carrot cultivars are commonly classified by their root shape. The four general types are:

- Chantenay. Although the roots are shorter than other cultivars, they have vigorous foliage and greater girth, being broad in the shoulders and tapering towards a blunt, rounded tip. They store well, have a pale core, and are mostly used for processing.
- Danvers. These have strong foliage, and the roots are longer than Chantenay types, and they have a conical shape with a well-defined shoulder, tapering to a point. They are somewhat shorter than Imperator cultivars, but more tolerant of heavy soil conditions. Danvers cultivars store well and are used both fresh and for processing. They were developed in 1871 in Danvers, Massachusetts.
- Imperator. This cultivar has vigorous foliage, is of high sugar content, and has long and slender roots, tapering to a pointed tip. Imperator types are the most widely cultivated by commercial growers.
- Nantes. These have sparse foliage, are cylindrical, short with a blunter tip than Imperator types, and attain high yields in a range of conditions. The skin is easily damaged and the core is deeply pigmented. They are brittle, high in sugar, and store less well than other types.

Breeding programs have developed new cultivars to have dense amounts of chemically-stable acylated pigments, such as anthocyanins, which can produce different colours. One particular cultivar lacks the usual orange pigment due to carotene, owing its white colour to a recessive gene for tocopherol (vitamin E), but this cultivar and wild carrots do not provide nutritionally significant amounts of vitamin E.

Carrot production 2024, millions of tonnes
China	19.0
Uzbekistan	3.6
Russia	1.4
United States	1.1
United Kingdom	0.9
Turkey	0.9
Germany	0.9
World	45.1
Source: FAOSTAT of the United Nations

=== Storage ===
Carrots can be stored for several months in the refrigerator or over winter in a cool dry place. For long term storage, unwashed carrots can be placed in a bucket between dry layers of sand, a 50/50 mix of sand and wood shavings, or in soil. A temperature range of 0 to 4 °C (32 to 40 °F) and 90–95% humidity is best. During storage, carrots may be subject to the development of bitterness, white blush, and browning, leading to carrot losses. Bitterness can be prevented by storage in well-ventilated rooms with low ethylene content (for example, without ethylene-producing fruit and vegetables). White blush and browning can be countered with application of edible films, heat treatment, application of hydrogen sulfide, and ultraviolet irradiation.

=== Production ===
In 2024, world production of carrots (combined with turnips) was 45 million tonnes, led by China with 42% of the total. Uzbekistan, Russia, and the United States were the only other countries producing over 1 million tonnes annually (table).

Production of carrots and turnips

Carrot and turnip yield

== Uses ==
=== Nutrition ===
Carrots, raw
Nutritional value per 100 g (3.5 oz)
- Energy: 173 kJ (41 kcal)
- Carbohydrates: 9.6 g
- Sugars: 4.7 g
- Dietary fiber: 2.8 g
- Fat: 0.24 g
- Protein: 0.93 g
Vitamins and minerals
Vitamins	Quantity %DV^{†}
Vitamin A equiv. beta-Carotene lutein zeaxanthin	93% 835 μg 77% 8285 μg 256 μg
Thiamine (B1)	6% 0.066 mg
Riboflavin (B2)	4% 0.058 mg
Niacin (B3)	6% 0.983 mg
Pantothenic acid (B5)	5% 0.273 mg
Vitamin B6	8% 0.138 mg
Folate (B9)	5% 19 μg
Vitamin C	7% 5.9 mg
Vitamin E	4% 0.66 mg
Vitamin K	11% 13.2 μg
Minerals	Quantity %DV^{†}
Calcium	3% 33 mg
Iron	2% 0.3 mg
Magnesium	3% 12 mg
Manganese	6% 0.143 mg
Phosphorus	3% 35 mg
Potassium	11% 320 mg
Sodium	3% 69 mg
Zinc	2% 0.24 mg
- Other constituents: Quantity
- Water: 88 g
- Link to USDA Database Entry
- ^{†}Percentages estimated using US recommendations for adults, except for potassium, which is estimated based on expert recommendation from the National Academies.

A raw carrot is 88% water, 10% carbohydrates, 1% protein, and contains negligible fat (table). In a reference amount of 100 grams (3.5 oz), raw carrots supply 41 calories and have a rich content (20% or more of the Daily Value, DV) of vitamin A (93% DV) and a moderate amount (10–19% DV) of vitamin K (11% DV) and potassium (11% DV), but otherwise have low content of micronutrients (table).

As a common source of beta-carotene in diets, carrots are a provitamin A source; an enzyme converts beta-carotene into vitamin A in the small intestine.

=== Culinary ===
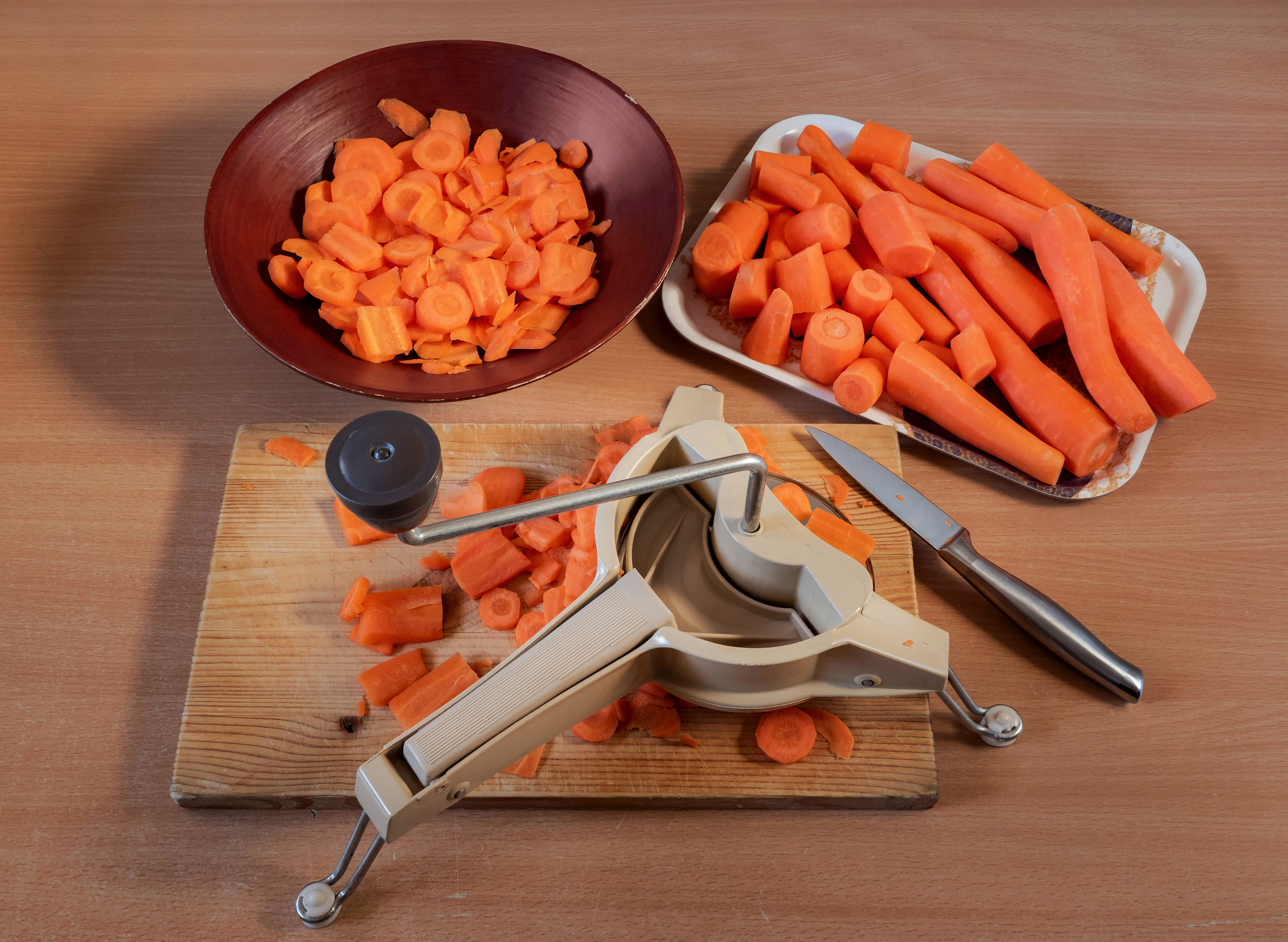
Carrots are often peeled and sliced in cooking

Carrots can be eaten in a variety of ways. Only 3 percent of the β-carotene in raw carrots is released during digestion: this can be improved to 39% by pulping, cooking and adding cooking oil. Alternatively they may be chopped and boiled, fried or steamed, and cooked in soups and stews, as well as baby and pet foods. A well-known dish is carrots julienne. Together with onion and celery, carrots are one of the primary vegetables used in a mirepoix to make broths.

The greens are edible as a leaf vegetable, but are rarely eaten by humans; some sources suggest that the greens contain toxic alkaloids. When used for this purpose, they are harvested young in high-density plantings, before significant root development, and typically used stir-fried, or in salads. Some people are allergic to carrots. In a 2010 study on the prevalence of food allergies in Europe, 3.6 percent of young adults showed some degree of sensitivity to carrots. Because the major carrot allergen, the protein Dauc c 1.0104, is cross-reactive with homologues in birch pollen (Bet v 1) and mugwort pollen (Art v 1), most carrot allergy sufferers are also allergic to pollen from these plants.

In India, carrots are used in a variety of ways, as salads or as vegetables added to spicy rice or dal dishes. A popular variation in north India is the gajar ka halwa carrot dessert, which has carrots grated and cooked in milk until the whole mixture is solid, after which nuts and butter are added. Carrot salads are usually made with grated carrots with a seasoning of mustard seeds and green chillies popped in hot oil. Carrots can also be cut into thin strips and added to rice, can form part of a dish of mixed roast vegetables, or can be blended with tamarind to make chutney.

Since the late 1980s, baby carrots or mini-carrots (carrots that have been peeled and cut into uniform cylinders) have been a popular ready-to-eat snack food available in many supermarkets. Carrot juice is widely marketed, especially as a health drink, either stand-alone or blended with juices from fruits and other vegetables.

The sweetness of carrots allows the vegetable to be used in some fruit-like roles. They are used grated in carrot cakes, as well as carrot puddings, an English dish thought to have originated in the early 19th century. Carrots can be used alone or blended with fruits in jams and preserves. In the European Union, there is a rule specifying that only fruits can be used in making jams; to preserve the Portuguese carrot jam delicacy (or Doce de Cenoura in Portuguese), the Council of the European Union adopted a directive that, for purposes of regulation of fruit jams and jellies, considers carrots as fruit.

Very high consumption of carrots over a long period of time can result in carotenemia, a harmless yellow-orange discoloration of the skin caused by a buildup of carotenoids.

== In culture ==
Despite common claims, the provitamin A beta-carotene from carrots does not actually help people to see in the dark unless they suffer from vitamin A deficiency. A rumour spread during the Second World War purporting to explain that British pilots had improved night vision from eating carrots which enabled their success during nighttime air battles; in actuality, it was due to newly adopted radar technology.

The consumption of carrots was advocated in Britain at the time as part of a Dig for Victory campaign. A radio program called The Kitchen Front encouraged people to grow, store and use carrots in various novel ways, including making carrot jam and Woolton pie, named after the Lord Woolton, the Minister for Food. The British public during WWII generally thought that eating carrots would help them see better at night and in 1942 there was a 100,000-ton surplus of carrots from the extra production.

== See also ==
- Carrot and stick – Metaphor for the use of punishment and reward
- Carrot harvester – Harvesting machine
- Carrot seed oil – Essential oil extract of carrot seed
- Turnip – Type of root vegetable

== Sources ==
- Benjamin, L. R.; McGarry, A.; Gray, D. (1997). "The root vegetables: Beet, carrot, parsnip and turnip". The Physiology of Vegetable Crops. Wallingford, UK: CAB International. pp. 553–580. ISBN 978-0-85199-146-7.
- Bradeen, James M.; Simon, Philipp W. (2007). "Carrot". In Cole, Chittaranjan (ed.). Vegetables. Genome Mapping and Molecular Breeding in Plants. Vol. 5. New York, NY: Springer. pp. 162–184. ISBN 978-3-540-34535-0.
- Rubatsky, V. E.; Quiros, C. F.; Siman, P. W. (1999). Carrots and Related Vegetable Umbelliferae. CABI Publishing. ISBN 978-0-85199-129-0.
- Simon, Philipp W.; Freeman, Roger E.; Vieira, Jairo V.; Boiteux, Leonardo S.; Briard, Mathilde; Nothnagel, Thomas; Michalik, Barbara; Kwon, Young-Seok (2008). "Carrot". Vegetables II. Handbook of Plant Breeding. Vol. 2. New York, NY: Springer. pp. 327–357. ISBN 978-0-387-74108-6.
