= Carrot harvester =

Harvesting machine

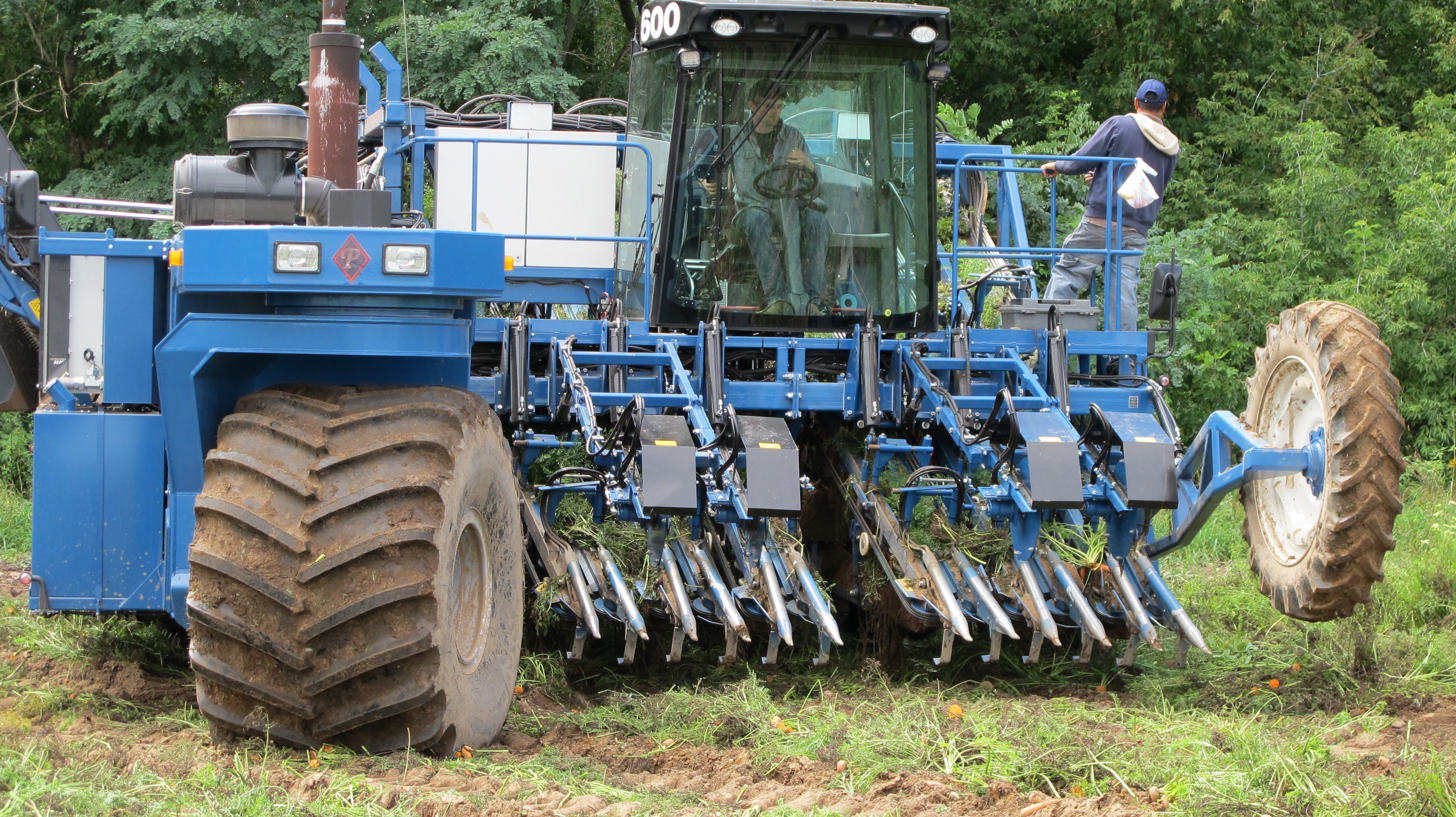
This is the 6 row Self Propelled carrot harvester Asa Lift started up in 2011

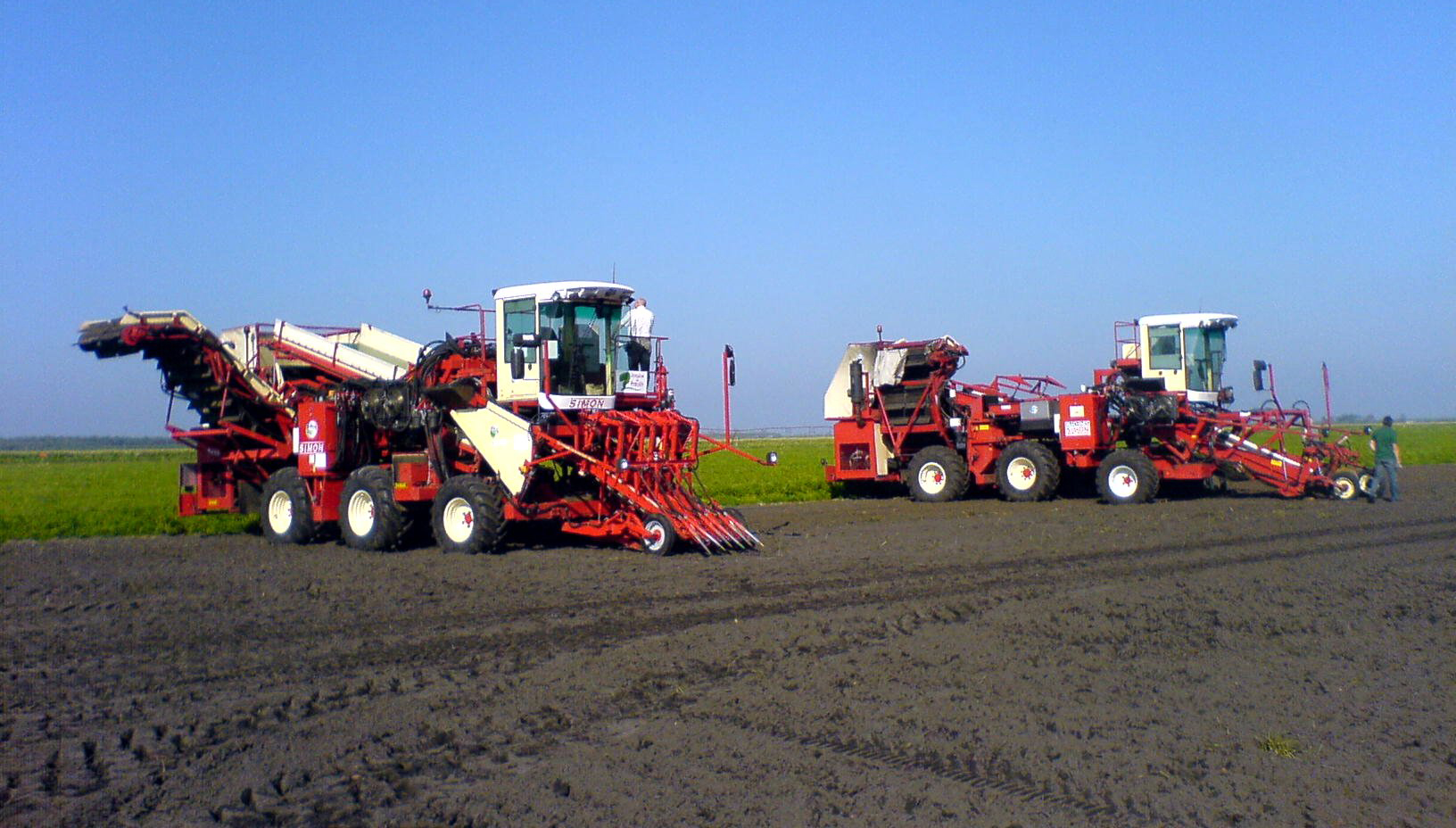
A top lift and a share lift self-propelled carrot harvester manufactured by SIMON

A Carrot harvester is an agricultural machine for harvesting carrots. Carrot harvesters are either top lifters or share lifters and may be tractor mounted, trailed behind a tractor or self-propelled. The machine typically harvests between one and six rows of carrots at once.

== Operation ==
The two types of harvesters differ in how they get the carrots from the ground.

=== Top lifting harvesters ===
Top lifters use rubber belts to grab the green tops of the carrot plant and pull them from the soil. A share pushes under the carrot root and loosens the plant.

The belt takes the entire carrot into the machine where the tops are cut off, sent along a waste path, and dropped back on to the field.

=== Share lifting harvesters ===
A share lifter uses a share to get the carrots out of the ground from underneath. The machine must be preceded by a topper to cut the green tops off the carrot plants. The carrots travel along a longer web to separate the soil.

=== Cleaning and collection ===
The carrot roots travel along one or more webs to remove most of the soil attached to the carrot. The carrots are collected either in a storage tank on the machine (called a "Bunker") or in a trailer pulled alongside the machine by another tractor.
