= Pythiosis =

Tropical disease caused by the oomycete Pythium insidiosum

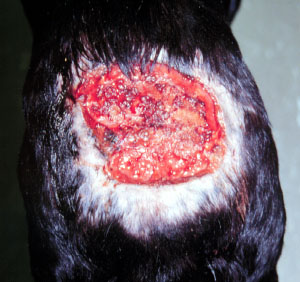
Destructive skin lesion on a dog caused by P. insidiosum

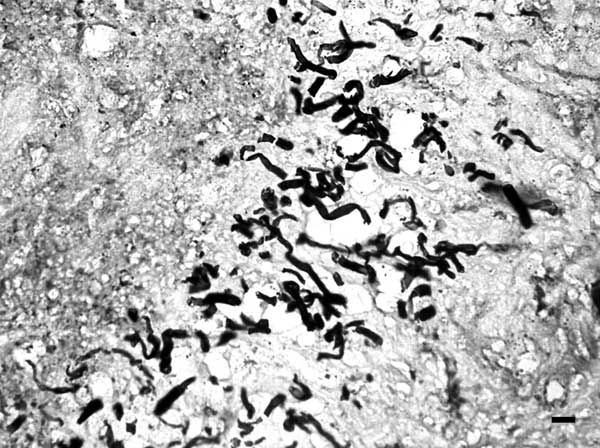
Pythium hyphae

Pythiosis is a rare and deadly tropical disease caused by the oomycete Pythium insidiosum. Long regarded as being caused by a fungus, the causative agent was not discovered until 1987. It occurs most commonly in horses, dogs, and humans, with isolated cases in other large mammals. The disease is contracted after exposure to stagnant fresh water such as swamps, ponds, lakes, and rice paddies. P. insidiosum is different from other members of the genus in that human and horse hair, skin, and decaying animal and plant tissue are chemoattractants for its zoospores. Additionally, it is the only member in the genus known to infect mammals, while other members are pathogenic to plants and are responsible for some well-known plant diseases.

== Epidemiology ==
Pythiosis occurs in areas with mild winters because the organism survives in standing water that does not reach freezing temperatures. In the United States, it is most commonly found in the Southern Gulf states, especially Louisiana, Florida, and Texas, but has also been reported as far away as California and Wisconsin. It is also found in southeast Asia, eastern Australia, New Zealand, and South America.

== Pathophysiology ==
Pythiosis is suspected to be caused by invasion of the organism into wounds, either in the skin or in the gastrointestinal tract. The disease grows slowly in the stomach and small intestine, eventually forming large lumps of granulation tissue. It can also invade surrounding lymph nodes.

== In different animals ==
The species are listed in decreasing frequency of infection.

=== Horses ===
In horses, subcutaneous pythiosis is the most common form and infection occurs through a wound while standing in water containing the pathogen. The disease is also known as leeches, swamp cancer, and bursatti. Lesions are most commonly found on the lower limbs, abdomen, chest, and genitals. They are granulomatous and itchy, and may be ulcerated or fistulated. The lesions often contain yellow, firm masses of dead tissue known as 'kunkers'. It is possible with chronic infection for the disease to spread to underlying bone.

=== Dogs ===
Pythiosis of the skin in dogs is rare, and appears as ulcerated lumps. Primary infection can also occur in the bones and lungs. Dogs with the gastrointestinal form of pythiosis have severe thickening of one or more portions of the gastrointestinal tract that may include the stomach, small intestine, colon, rectum, or in rare cases, even the esophagus. The resulting pathology results in anorexia, vomiting, diarrhea (sometimes bloody), and abdominal straining. Extensive weight loss may be evident.

=== Humans ===
In humans, it can cause arteritis, keratitis, and periorbital cellulitis. This has previously been thought to be a rare disease with only 28 cases reported in the literature up to 1996. However, keratitis due to Pythium may be more common than previously thought, accounting for a proportion of cases that were due to unidentified pathogens. Although this disease was first reported in 1884 the species infecting humans - Pythium insidiosum - was only formally recognised in 1987. Diagnosis can be difficult in part because of a lack of awareness of the disease. It does not appear to be transmissible either animal to animal or animal to human. There appear to be three clades of this organism: one in the Americas, a second from Asia and Australia and a third with isolates from Thailand and the USA. The most probable origin of the organism seems to be in Asia.

Most human cases have been reported in Thailand, although cases have been reported elsewhere. In humans, the four forms of the disease are: subcutaneous, disseminated, ocular, and vascular. The ocular form of the disease is the only one known to infect otherwise healthy humans, and has been associated with contact lens use while swimming in infected water. Ocular pythiosis occurs more frequently in the Americas, while corporal infections tend to occur in Asia. This is also the rarest form with most cases requiring enucleation of the eye. The other forms of the disease require a pre-existing medical condition, usually associated with thalassemic hemoglobinopathy. Prognosis is poor to guarded and treatments include aggressive surgical resection of infected tissue, with amputation suggested if the infection is limited to a distal limb followed by immunotherapy and chemotherapy. A recently published review lists nine cases of vascular pythiosis with five survivors receiving surgery with free margins and all except one requiring amputation. The same review lists nine cases of ocular pythiosis with five patients requiring enucnleation of the infected eye and four patients requiring a corneal transplant.

=== Cats and other animals ===
In cats, pythioisis is almost always confined to the skin as hairless and edematous lesions. It is usually found on the limbs, perineum, and at the base of the tail. Lesions may also develop in the nasopharynx. Rabbits are susceptible to pythiosis and are used for in vivo studies of the disease. Other animals reported to have contracted pythiosis are bears, jaguars, camels, and birds, although these have only been singular events.

== Diagnosis and treatment ==
Pythiosis is suspected to be heavily underdiagnosed due to unfamiliarity with the disease, the rapid progression and morbidity, and the difficulty in making a diagnosis. Symptoms often appear once the disease has progressed to the point where treatments are less effective. As the organism is neither a bacterium, virus, nor fungus, routine tests often fail to diagnose it. In cytology and histology, the organism does not stain using Giemsa, H&E, or Diff-Quick, but the hyphae are outlined by surrounding tissue. GMS staining is required to identify the hyphae in slides, and highlights the lack of septation which helps distinguish the organism from fungal hyphae. Granulomatous inflammation with numerous eosinophils is suggestive that the hyphae are oomycetes rather than fungi, which are less likely to attract eosinophils. The symptoms are usually nonspecific and the disease may not be included in a differential diagnosis in human medicine, though it is familiar to veterinarians.

Biopsies of infected tissues are known to be difficult to culture, but can help narrow the diagnosis to several different organisms. A definite diagnosis is confirmed using ELISA testing of serum for pythiosis antibodies, or by PCR testing of infected tissues or cultures.

Due to the poor efficacy of single treatments, pythiosis infections are often treated using a variety of different treatments, all with varying success. Most successful treatments include surgery, immunotherapy, and various prescription drugs.

Aggressive surgical resection is the treatment of choice for pythiosis. Because it provides the best opportunity for cure, complete excision of infected tissue should be pursued whenever possible. When cutaneous lesions are limited to a single distal extremity, amputation is often recommended. In animals with gastrointestinal pythiosis, segmental lesions should be resected with 5-cm margins whenever possible. Unfortunately, surgical excision of tissue and amputation do not guarantee complete success and lesions can reappear. So, surgery is often followed by other treatments.

An immunotherapy product derived from antigens of P. insidiosum has been used successfully to treat pythiosis.

Case reports indicate the use of the following prescription drugs with varying levels of success: potassium iodide, amphotericin B, terbinafine, itraconazole, fluconazole, ketoconazole, natamycin, posaconazole, voriconazole, prednisone, flucytosine, liposomal nystatin and azithromycin + doxycycline.
