= Damping off =

Horticultural disease or condition

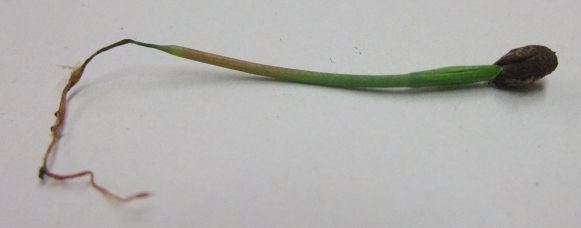
A Pinus taeda seedling that was destroyed by fungus

Damping off (or damping-off) is a horticultural disease or condition, caused by several different pathogens that kill or weaken seeds or seedlings before or after they germinate. It is most prevalent in wet and cool conditions.

== Symptoms ==
There are various symptoms associated with damping off; these reflect the variety of different pathogenic organisms which can cause the condition. However, all symptoms result in the death of at least some seedlings in any given population.

Groups of seedlings may die in roughly circular patches, the seedlings sometimes having stem lesions at ground level. Stems of seedlings may also become thin and tough ("wire-stem") resulting in reduced seedling vigor. Leaf spotting sometimes accompanies other symptoms, as does a grey mold growth on stems and leaves. Roots sometimes rot completely or back to just discolored stumps.

== Causal agents ==
A number of different fungi and fungi-like organisms cause the symptoms of damping off, including:

- Alternaria – a genus of fungi that can cause leaf spotting.
- Botrytis cinerea – a fungus, also known as "grey mould". Symptoms caused by this often accompany other symptoms.
- Fusarium – a genus of fungi.
- Macrophomina phaseoli – a fungus that causes charcoal rot on many plant species including Zea mays and Pinus elliottii.
- Phyllosticta – a genus of fungi that can cause leaf spotting.
- Phytophthora – a genus of plant-damaging oomycetes (water molds), whose member species are capable of causing enormous economic losses on crops worldwide, as well as environmental damage in natural ecosystems.
- Pseudomonas – a genus of bacteria that can cause leaf spotting.
- Pythium – a genus of parasitic oomycete. Once classified as fungi, and consequently sometimes still treated as such. Along with Rhizoctonia solani, attacks by Pythium are most associated with producing roughly circular patches of dead seedlings.
- Rhizoctonia – a genus of fungi with a wide host range and worldwide distribution.
- Sclerotium rolfsii – a corticioid fungus in the family Atheliaceae. It is a facultative plant pathogen and is the causal agent of "southern blight" disease in crops.
- Thielaviopsis – a small genus of fungi in the order Microascales. The genus includes several important agricultural pathogens.

== Prevention ==
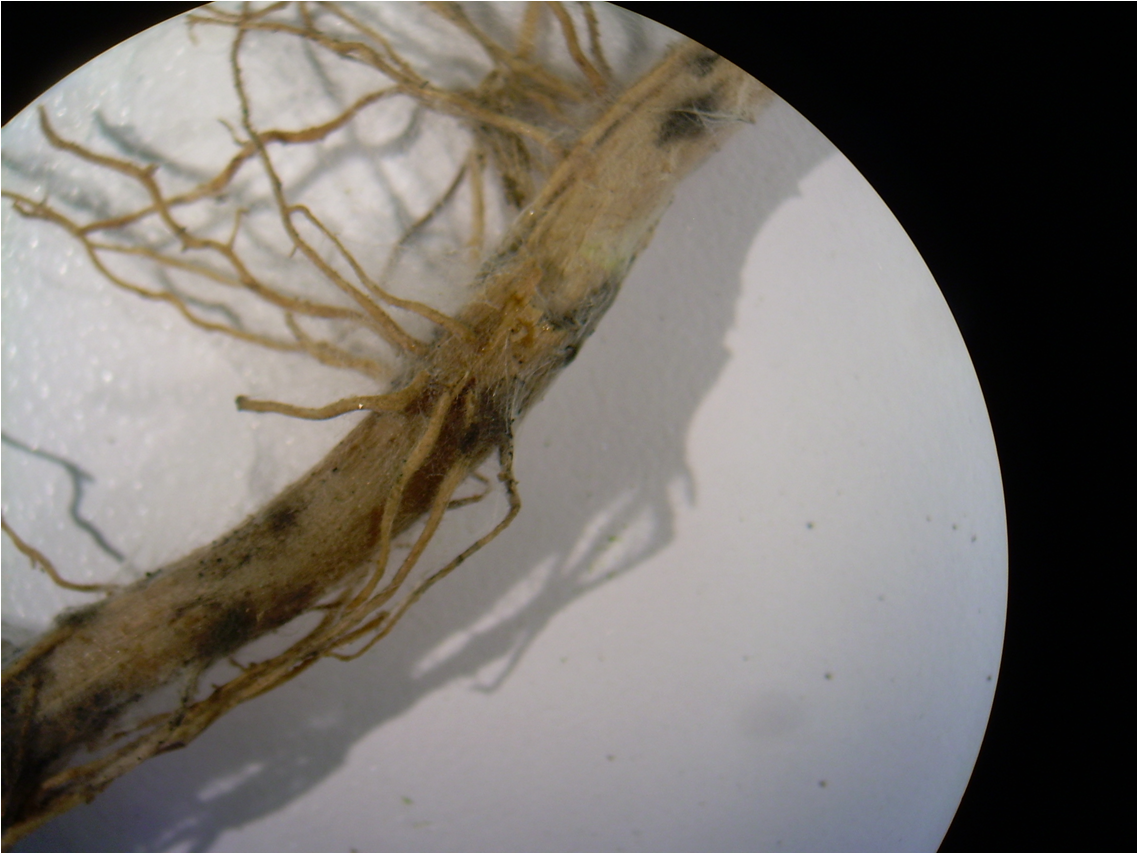
Rhizoctonia solani root rot on corn roots, magnified 0.63X

Damping off can be prevented or controlled in several different ways. Sowing seeds in a sterilized growing medium can be effective, although fungal spores may still be introduced to the medium, either on the seeds themselves or after sowing (in water or on the wind). To reduce survival of the pathogens, remove and discard diseased plants, and sterilize containers to remove dust, planting medium, and soil particles in which spores can survive. Maintaining drier conditions with better air circulation helps prevent the spread of the disease, although it can also prevent or slow down germination. Spraying or drenching the soil with a recommended anti-fungal treatment (such as copper oxychloride) also helps suppress the disease. Homemade solutions (including ones made from chamomile tea or garlic) are used by some gardeners for this purpose.

In the UK, a copper-based fungicide called Cheshunt compound was widely used by amateur and professional gardeners against damping off, but it was withdrawn from sale in the UK in November 2010 (last legal use 30 Nov 2011). Developed at an Agricultural Research Council Experimental Station in Cheshunt, Hertfordshire, UK, it was a mixture of copper sulfate and ammonium carbonate, which could be mixed by the gardener or bought ready-prepared.
