= Oospore =

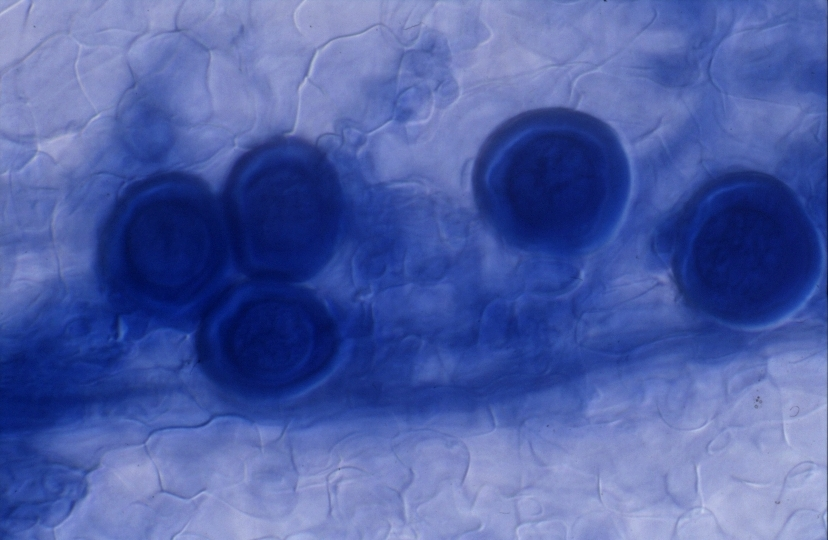
Oospores of Hyaloperonospora parasitica, agent of the downy mildew (in the middle)

An oospore is a thick-walled sexual spore that develops from a fertilized oosphere in some algae, certain fungi, and oomycetes, which are fungus-like stramenopiles rather than true fungi. They are believed to have evolved either through the fusion of two species or the chemically induced stimulation of mycelia, leading to oospore formation.

In Oomycetes, oospores can also result from asexual reproduction, by apomixis. These haploid, non-motile spores are the site of meiosis and karyogamy in oomycetes.

A dormant oospore, when observed under an electron microscope, has led researchers to draw conclusion that there is only a single central globule with other storage bodies surrounding it.
