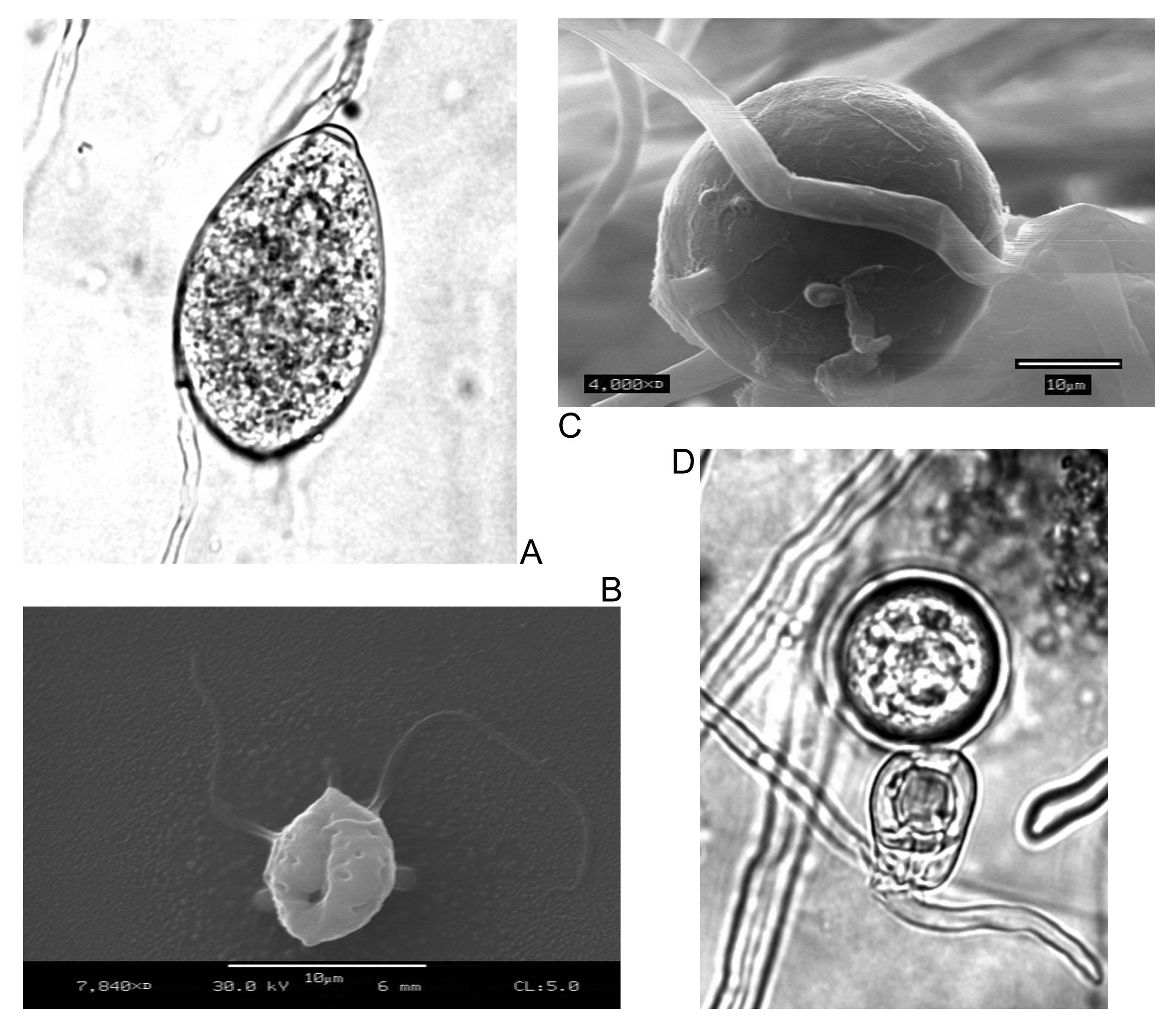
- Water mould - Phytophthora forms: A: Sporangia. B: Zoospore. C: Chlamydospore. D: Oospore

Scientific classification
- Domain: Eukaryota
- Clade: Sar
- Clade: Stramenopiles
- Phylum: Oomycota
- Class: Peronosporomycetes
- Order: Peronosporales
- Family: Pythiaceae; J. Schröt., 1893

Type genus
- Pythium Pringsh., 1858

Genera
- Cystosiphon; Diasporangium; Globisporangium; Lagenidium; Myzocytium; Pythium; Trachysphaera

= Pythiaceae =

Family of water moulds

Pythiaceae is a family of oomycetes. The family includes serious plant and animal pathogens in the genus Pythium. The family was circumscribed by German mycologist Joseph Schröter in 1893.

== Lifecycle ==
- Live on land (terrestrial), and in water (aquatic), or a combination of the two (amphibious).
- Most are deadly parasites, causing root rot and damping off on plants and pythiosis on animals.
- The diploid (2N) life stage predominates, with a short haplophase initiated during sexual reproduction before the fusion of the gametes. Most species are homothallic.

== Reproduction ==
The sporangia may germinate via a germ tube or by release of motile zoospores, depending on the species and the environmental conditions.

== Economic importance ==
Some Pythium species cause "damping off" diseases in young plants (seedlings).
