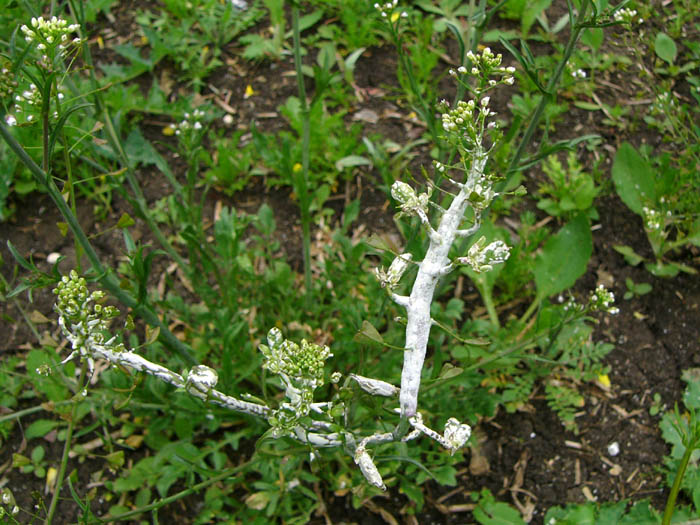
- Albugo candida on Capsella bursa-pastoris

Scientific classification
- Domain: Eukaryota
- Clade: Diaphoretickes
- Clade: Sar
- Clade: Stramenopiles
- Phylum: Gyrista
- Class: Oomycetes
- Order: Peronosporales; A.Fisch.

Families
- Albuginaceae; Peronosporaceae; Pythiaceae; (list may not be complete)

Synonyms
- Pythiales M.W. Dick

= Peronosporales =

Order of plant pathogens

The Peronosporales are an order of water moulds (class Oomycetes) which can be pathogenic.

Many diseases of plants are sometimes classified under this order, but are sometimes considered members of order Pythiales. Some of these pathogenic protists include the organisms responsible for potato blight, eucalyptus dieback, sudden oak death, and blue mold. Further genetic studies may place these organisms more definitively in one order or another.
