= List of strawberry diseases =

This article is a list of diseases of strawberry (Fragaria × ananassa).

== Bacterial diseases ==
Bacterial diseases
Angular leaf spot	Xanthomonas fragariae
Bacterial wilt	Pseudomonas solanacearum
Cauliflower disease (complex)	Rhodococcus fascians = Corynebacterium fascians

== Oomycete diseases ==
Oomycete diseases
Downy mildew	Peronospora potentillae = Peronospora fragariae

== Fungal diseases ==
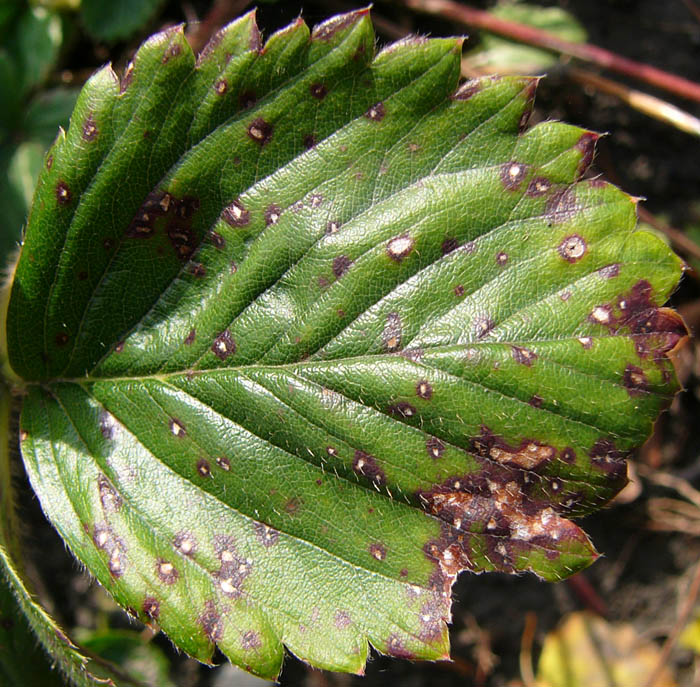
older stadium of Mycosphaerella fragariae on strawberry

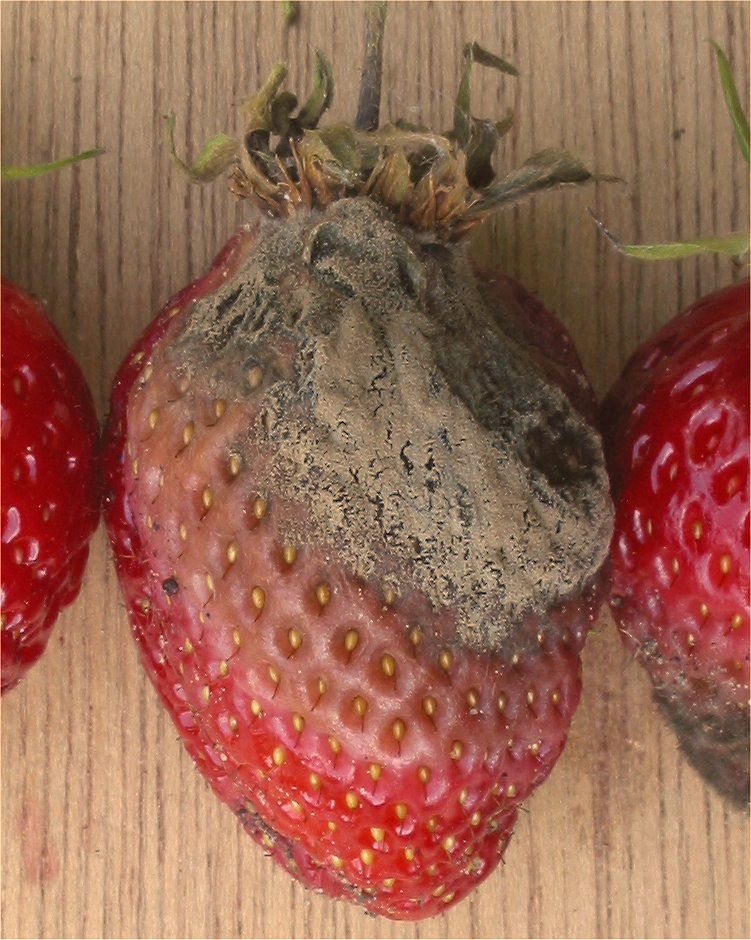
Botrytis cinerea on strawberry

Powdery mildew on strawberry

Fungal diseases
Alternaria fruit rot	Alternaria tenuissima
Anther and pistil blight	Rhizoctonia fragariae Ceratobasidium sp. [teleomorph]
Anthracnose and anthracnose fruit rot and black spot	Colletotrichum acutatum species complex: C. fioriniae; C. nymphaeae; Colletotrichum gloeosporioides species complex: C. fragariae; C. fructicola; C. siamense (syn. C. murrayae); Glomerella cingulata [teleomorph] (archaic); Gloeosporium spp. (archaic)
Armillaria crown and root rot (shoestring crown and root rot)	Armillaria mellea Rhizomorpha subcorticalis [anamorph]
Black leaf spot	Alternaria alternata f.sp. fragariae Colletotrichum gloeosporioides = Colletotrichum fragariae
Black root rot (disease complex)	Rhizoctonia fragariae Ceratobasidium [teleomorph] sp. Coniothyrium fuckelii Diapleella coniothyrium [teleomorph] = Leptosphaeria coniothyrium Hainesia lythri Discohainesia oenotherae [teleomorph] Idriella lunata Pyrenochaeta sp. Pythium spp. Pythium ultimum
Cercospora leaf spot	Cercospora fragariae Cercospora vexans
Charcoal rot	Macrophomina phaseolina = Botryodiplodia phaseoli
Common leaf spot	Mycosphaerella fragariae Ramularia brunnea [anamorph]
Coniothyrium diseases	Coniothyrium fuckelii Coniella fragariae = Coniothyrium fragariae
Dematophora crown and root rot (white root rot)	Rosellinia necatrix Dematophora necatrix [anamorph]
Diplodina rot (leaf and stalk rot)	Phoma lycopersici = Diplodina lycopersici Didymella lycopersici [teleomorph]
Fruit rots (in addition to those appearing elsewhere in this listing)	Aspergillus niger Cladosporium spp. Mucor mucedo Mucor hiemalis Mucor hiemalis f. silvaticus Mucor piriformis Penicillium aurantiogriseum = Penicillium cyclopium Penicillium expansum Penicillium glabrum = Penicillium frequentans Penicillium purpurogenum
Byssochlamys rot	Byssochlamys fulva Paecilomyces fulvus [anamorph]
Brown cap	Foliar pathogens which attack cap-drying
Fruit blotch	Fusarium sambucinum Gibberella pulicaris[teleomorph] Penicillium purpurogenum Peronospora potentillae Sphaeropsis malorum Botryosphaeria obtusa [teleomorph] = Physalospora obtusa Sclerotium rolfsii Athelia rolfsii [teleomorph] = Corticium rolfsii Schizoparme straminea Coniella castaneicola [anamorph] = Pilidiella quercicola
Gray mold leaf blight and dry crown rot	Botrytis cinerea Botryotinia fuckeliana (teleomorph)
Hainesia leaf spot	Hainesia lythri
Hard brown rot	Rhizoctonia solani Thanatephorus cucumeris [teleomorph] Macrophomina phaseolina = Macrophomina phaseoli = Rhizoctonia bataticola
Leaf blotch	Gnomonia comari Zythia fragariae [anamorph] Gnomonia fragariae
Leaf rust	Phragmidium potentillae = Frommea obtusa
Leaf scorch	Diplocarpon earlianum Marssonina fragariae [anamorph] = Marssonina potentillae
Leather rot	Phytophthora cactorum Phytophthora citricola Phytophthora citrophthora Phytophthora nicotianae = Phytophthora parasitica
Lilac soft rot	Pythium sp.
Pestalotia fruit rot	Pestalotia laurocerasi Pestalotia longisetula
Leaf blight	Phomopsis obscurans = Dendrophoma obscurans Neopestalotiopsis clavispora
Postharvest rots	Botrytis cinerea Mucor mucedo Pichia membranifaciens Pichia subpelliculosa = Hansenula subpelliculosa Saccharomyces cerevisiae Saccharomyces kluyveri Zygosaccharomyces bailii = Saccharomyces bailii Zygotorulaspora florentina = Saccharomyces florentinus, Zygosaccharomyces florentinus
Powdery mildew	Podosphaera fragariae unknown Podosphaera (Americas)
Phytophthora crown and root rot	Phytophthora sp. Phytophthora cactorum Phytophthora citricola Phytophthora citrophthora Phytophthora megasperma Phytophthora nicotianae var. parasitica
Other root rots
Botrytis crown rot	Botrytis cinerea
Gray sterile fungus root rot	Phoma terrestris = Pyrenochaeta terrestris
Idriella root rot	Idriella lunata
Macrophomina root rot	Macrophomina phaseolina
Olpidium root infection	Olpidium brassicae
Synchytrium root gall	Synchytrium fragariae
Purple leaf spot	Mycosphaerella louisianae
Red stele	Phytophthora fragariae
Rhizoctonia bud and crown rot, leaf blight, web blight, fruit rot	Rhizoctonia solani Rhizoctonia fragariae
Rhizopus rot (leak)	Rhizopus stolonifer
Sclerotinia crown and fruit rot	Sclerotinia sclerotiorum
Septoria hard rot and leaf spot	Septoria fragariae = Septogloeum potentillae Septoria aciculosa Septoria fragariaecola
Stunt (Pythium root rot)	Pythium ultimum Pythium spp. Pythium acanthicum Pythium debaryanum Pythium dissotocum Pythium hypogynum Pythium irregulare Pythium middletonii = Pythium proliferum Pythium myriotylum Pythium perniciosum Pythium rostratum Pythium sylvaticum
Southern blight (Sclerotium rot)	Sclerotium rolfsii
Stem-end rot	Gnomonia comari
Tan-brown rot (of fruit)	Pilidium lythri (previously known as Pilidium concavum) Discohainesia oenotherae Hainesia lythri = Patellina fragariae [anamorph]
Verticillium wilt	Verticillium albo-atrum Verticillium dahliae

== Miscellaneous diseases and disorders ==
Miscellaneous diseases and disorders
Pith necrosis and crown death	Unknown
Rapid death	Unknown, resembles P. cactorum
Slime molds	Diachea leucopodia Physarum cinereum

== Nematodes, parasitic ==
Nematodes, parasitic
Bulb and stem	Ditylenchus dipsaci
Dagger	Xiphenema spp.
Dagger, American	Xiphenema americanum
Lesion	Pratylenchus coffeae Pratylenchus penetrans Pratylenchus pratensis Pratylenchus scribneri
Root-knot	Meloidogyne spp. Meloidogyne hapla
Spring dwarf (crimp) or foliar nematodes	Aphelenchoides fragariae Aphelenchoides ritzemabosi
Sting	Belonolaimus longicaudatus Belonolaimus gracilis
Summer dwarf (crimp)	Aphelenchoides besseyi

== Phytoplasma, Virus and virus-like diseases ==
Virus and virus-like diseases
Aphid-transmitted
Strawberry chlorotic fleck	Strawberry chlorotic fleck (graft-transmissible agent of unknown relationship)
Strawberry crinkle	Strawberry crinkle virus (SCV) (cytoplasmic rhabdovirus)
Strawberry latent C virus in Fragaria	Strawberry latent C virus (SLCV) (nuclear rhabdovirus)
Strawberry mild yellow-edge	Strawberry mild yellow-edge virus (SMYEV) (plus an unnamed potexvirus)
Strawberry mottle	Strawberry mottle virus (SMV) (Relationship unknown)
Strawberry pseudo mild yellow-edge	Strawberry pseudo mild yellow-edge virus (SPMYEV) (carlavirus)
Strawberry vein banding	Strawberry vein banding virus (SVBV) (caulimovirus)
Leafhopper-transmitted phytoplasma and rickettsia-like agents (vectors known or probable):
Aster yellows	Aster yellows phytoplasma
Maladie du bord jaune	phytoplasma
Strawberry green petal	Strawberry green petal phytoplasma
Strawberry lethal decline	Strawberry lethal decline phytoplasma
Strawberry multiplier plant	Strawberry Multiplier MLO
Strawberry mycoplasma yellows disease	Strawberry yellows phytoplasma
Strawberry rickettsia yellows disease	Strawberry yellows rickettsia-like organism (SYRLO)
Strawberry witches'-broom	Strawberry witches'-broom MLO
Nematode-transmitted
Arabis mosaic virus	Arabis mosaic virus (ArMV) (nepovirus)
Raspberry ringspot virus	Raspberry ringspot virus (nepovirus)
Strawberry latent ringspot virus	Strawberry latent ringspot virus (SLRV) (nepovirus)
Tomato black ring virus	Tomato black ring virus (TomBRV) (nepovirus)
Tomato ringspot virus	Tomato ringspot virus (TomRSV) (nepovirus)
Fungus-transmitted
Tobacco necrosis virus in Fragaria vesca	Tobacco necrosis virus (TNV) (necrovirus)
Pollen-transmitted
Strawberry pallidosis	Strawberry pallidosis (graft- and pollen-transmissible agent of unknown relationship)
Thrips-transmitted
Strawberry necrotic shock	Tobacco streak virus, strawberry strain (TSV-SNS) (Ilarvirus)
Vectors unknown
Strawberry leafroll	Strawberry leafroll (graft-transmissible agent(s) of unknown relationship
Strawberry feather-leaf	Strawberry feather-leaf (graft-transmissible agent of unknown relationship
Non-graft transmissible virus-like disease
Strawberry June yellows	Genetically transmitted disorder of unknown cause

== See also ==
- List of strawberry topics
