= M. rubra =

M. rubra may refer to:

- Marmosa rubra, the red mouse opossum, a South American marsupial species
- Mesogona rubra, a moth species found in the Cascade Mountains north to Skamania County, Washington, United States
- Microhyla rubra, a narrow-mouthed frog species found in India
- Miomantis rubra, a praying mantis species
- Morus rubra, the red mulberry, a plant species native to eastern North America
- Mycteroperca rubra, the mottled grouper, a fish species
- Myrica rubra, the yangmei or Chinese strawberry tree, a subtropical tree species
- Myrmica rubra, the European fire ant or common red ant, an ant species found all over Europe
