= Hubertus Antonius van der Aa =

Dutch mycologist (1935–2017)

- Born: 5 July 1935; Tilburg
- Died: 7 May 2017 (aged 81)

Hubertus Antonius van der Aa (Dutch pronunciation: [ɦyˈbɛrtʏs ɑnˈtoːnijʏs fɑn dər ˈaː]; 5 July 1935 – 7 May 2017) was a Dutch mycologist who described several genera and species of fungi. He studied at Utrecht University where he received his PhD in 1973 with the dissertation Studies in phyllosticta I.

== Publications ==
- "Petrakia irregularis. A new fungus species". Acta Botanica Neerlandica. 17 (3): 221–225. 1968. doi:10.1111/j.1438-8677.1968.tb00076.x.
- van der Aa, H. A.; van Kesteren, H. A. (1971). "The identity of Phyllosticta destructiva and similar Phoma-like fungi described from Malvaceae-D and Lycium halimifolium-D". Acta Botanica Neerlandica. 20 (5): 552–563. doi:10.1111/j.1438-8677.1971.tb00740.x.
- van der Aa, H. A. (1973). "Studies in Phyllosticta. Part 1". Studies in Mycology (5): 1–110.
- Samson, R. A.; van der Aa, H. A. (1975). "Echinochondrium pulchrum. New genus, new Species, a new sclerotic hyphomycete". Revue de Mycologie. 39 (2): 103–106.
- Freyer, K.; van der Aa, H. A. (1975). "Pyrenochaeta parasitica. New species. The conidial stage of Herpotrichia parasitica equals Trichosphaeria parasitica". European Journal of Forest Pathology. 5 (3): 177–182. doi:10.1111/j.1439-0329.1975.tb00463.x.
- van der Aa, H. A. (1976). "The rust fungi of reeds. An introduction to the Uredinales". Coolia. 19 (1): 15–23.
- van der Aa, H. A. (1977). "The rusts of reeds. Some amplifications". Coolia. 20 (1): 26–27.
- van der Aa, H. A. (1978). "71626 Agaricus macrosporus in the Eem polder, Netherlands". Coolia. 21 (1): 13–19.
- van der Aa, H. A. (1978). "Ganoderma resinaceum as a parasite of the beech tree". Coolia. 21 (2): 30–32.
- van der Aa, H. A. (1978). "Objections to the regular consumption of Agaricus macrosporus". Coolia. 21 (3): 67–68.
- Zazzerini, A.; van der Aa, H. A. (1979). "Morphology and pathogenicity of Phlyctaena vagabunda, a parasite of the olive tree Olea europaea". Phytopathologische Zeitschrift. 96 (3): 258–262. doi:10.1111/j.1439-0434.1979.tb01647.x.
- van der Aa, H. A. (1979). "A deviant form of Leucoagaricus naucinus". Coolia. 22 (4): 114–115.
- van der Aa, H. A.; van Kesteren, H. A. (1980). "Phoma heteromorphospora. New name". Persoonia. 10 (4): 542.
- von Arx, J. A.; van der Aa, H. A. (1981). "Pithosira and Xenoplaca 2. Dematiaceous Hyphomycete genera from South America". Persoonia. 11 (3): 387–389.
- Constantinescu, O.; van der Aa, H. A. (1982). "Phoma flavigena. New species from fresh water in Romania". Transactions of the British Mycological Society. 79 (2): 343–345. doi:10.1016/s0007-1536(82)80126-5.
- van der Aa, H. A. (1982). "Some changes in International Code of Botanical Nomenclature". Coolia. 25 (4): 101–104.
- van der Aa, H. A. (1983). "Coniella macrospora. New species". Proceedings of the Koninklijke Nederlandse Akademie van Wetenschappen Series C Biological and Medical Sciences. 86 (2): 121–126.
- van der Aa, H. A. (1984). "The clavarioid form of Pleurotus ostreatus". Coolia. 27 (4): 85–89.
- van der Aa, H. A.; van Oorschot, C. A. N. (1985). "A redescription of some genera with staurospores". Persoonia. 12 (4): 415–426.
- van der Aa, H. A. (1986). "A striking attack on Hygrocybe". Coolia. 29 (1): 7–9.
- van der Aa, H. A. (1986). "Dichotomy and fasciation in Phallus impudicus". Coolia. 29 (4): 92–96.
- van der Aa, H. A. (1986). "Revision of Keissleriella podocarpi Butin". Sydowia. 39: 1–7.
- de Nooij, M. P.; van der Aa, H. A. (1987). "Phomopsis subordinaria and associated stalk disease in natural populations of Plantago lanceolata". Canadian Journal of Botany. 65 (11): 2318–2325. doi:10.1139/b87-315.
- von Arx, J. A.; Guarro, J.; van der Aa, H. A. (1987). "Asordaria. New genus of Sordariaceae and a new species of Melanocarpus". Persoonia. 13 (3): 263–272.
- von Arx, J. A.; var der Aa, H. A. (1987). "Spororminula tenerifae. New genus new species". Transactions of the British Mycological Society. 89 (1): 117–120. doi:10.1016/s0007-1536(87)80068-2.
- van der Aa, H. A. (1988). "Syzygospora tumefaciens. The cause of galls on Collybia". Coolia. 31 (3): 63–68.
- van Eijk, G. W.; Roeijmans, H. J.; van der Aa, H. A. (1988). "Labdane diterpene derivatives from Holwaya mucida". Journal of Microbiology. 54 (4): 325–330. doi:10.1007/bf00393523.
- van der Aa, H. A. (1989). "Polycoccum peltigerae and Didymosphaeria arxii. New species and their anamorphs". Studies in Mycology (31): 15–22.
- var der Aa, H. A.; Noordeloos, M. E.; de Gruyter, J. (1990). "Species concepts in some larger genera of the Coelomycetes". Studies in Mycology (32): 3–20.
- Guarro, J.; Cannon, P. F.; van der Aa, H. A. (1991). "A synopsis of the genus Zopfiella Ascomycetes Lasiosphaeriaceae". Systema Ascomycetum. 10 (2): 79–112.
- van der Aa, H. A. (1992). "Mycophilic honeybees". Coolia. 35 (3): 83–86.
- Kok, C. J.; Haverkamp, W.; van der Aa, H. A. (1992). "Influence of pH on the growth and leaf-maceration ability of fungi involved in the decomposition of floating leaves of Nymphaea alba in an acid water". Journal of General Microbiology. 138 (1): 103–108. doi:10.1099/00221287-138-1-103.
- van der Aa, H. A. (1993). "International Mycological Association". Coolia. 36 (1): 23–25.
- van der Aa, H. A; Samson, R. A. (1994). "A new species of Helicoön". Mycological Research. 98 (1): 74–76. doi:10.1016/s0953-7562(09)80340-7.
- van der Aa, H. A. (1998). "Nectria cosmariospora, a new Pyrenomycete for the Netherlands". Coolia. 41 (3): 148–150.
- Vanev, S. G.; van der Aa, H. A. (1998). "An annotated list of the published names in Asteromella". Persoonia. 17 (1): 47–67.
- Kovics, G. J.; de Gruyter, J.; van der Aa, H. A. (August 1999). "Phoma sojicola comb. nov. and other hyaline-spored Coelomycetes pathogenic on soybean". Mycological Research. 103 (8): 1065–1070. doi:10.1017/s0953756298007990.
- van der Aa, H. A.; Boerema, G. H.; de Gruyter, J. (2000). "Contributions towards a monograph of Phoma (Coelomycetes) VI - 1. Section Phyllostictoides: Characteristics and nomenclature of its type species Phoma exigua". Persoonia. 17 (3): 435–456.
- van der Aa, H. A.; Vanev, S.; Mel'nik, V. A.; et al. (September 2001). "A new species of Cytosporella (Coelomycetes, Deuteromycotina) from subantarctic Campbell Island (New Zealand)". New Zealand Journal of Botany. 39 (3): 543–545. doi:10.1080/0028825x.2001.9512756.
- de Gruyter, J.; Boerema, G. H.; van der Aa, H. A. (2002). "Contributions towards a monograph of Phoma (Coelomycetes) VI - 2. Section Phyllostictoides: Outline of its taxa". Persoonia. 18 (1): 1–53.
- Baayen, R. P.; Bonants, P. J. M.; Verkley, G.; et al. (May 2002). "Nonpathogenic isolates of the citrus black spot fungus, Guignardia citricarpa, identified as a cosmopolitan endophyte of woody plants, G. mangiferae (Phyllosticta capitalensis)". Phytopathology. 92 (5): 464–477. doi:10.1094/phyto.2002.92.5.464. PMID 18943020.
