= Fruit rot =

Fruit rot disease may refer to:

- Phomopsis leaf caused in grapes by Phomopsis viticola;
- Kole-roga caused in coconut and betel nut by Phytophthora palmivora;
- Botrytis bunch rot caused by Botrytis cinerea primarily in grapes;
- Black mold caused by Aspergillus niger;
- Leaf spot, and others, caused by Alternaria alternata;
- Bitter rot caused by Glomerella cingulata;
- Cladosporium rot or Soft rot caused by Cladosporium cladosporioides;
- Kernel rot or Fusariosis on maize (corn) caused by Fusarium sporotrichioides;
- Sour rot caused by Geotrichum candidum;
- Penicillium rot or Blue-eye caused by Penicillium chrysogenum;
- Soft rot or Blue mold caused by Penicillium expansum;
- Brown rot caused by Monilinia fructicola;
- Strawberry fruit rot caused by Pestalotia longisetula
