= Diplocarpon =

Scientific classification
- Kingdom: Fungi
- Division: Ascomycota
- Class: Leotiomycetes
- Order: Helotiales
- Family: Drepanopezizaceae
- Genus: Diplocarpon; F.A. Wolf

Type species
- Diplocarpon rosae F.A. Wolf

Genus of fungi

Diplocarpon is a genus of fungi in the family Drepanopezizaceae. The genus contains 6 species.

== Species ==
- Diplocarpon coronariae
- Diplocarpon earlianum
- Diplocarpon hymenaeae
- Diplocarpon impressum
- Diplocarpon mali
- Diplocarpon mespili
- Diplocarpon polygoni
- Diplocarpon rosae
- Diplocarpon saponariae
- Diplocarponella coprosmae
- Diplocarponella graminea
- Diplocarponella schoepfiae
