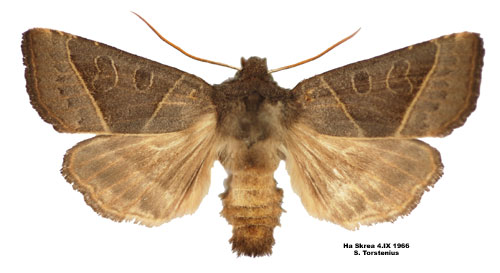
- Mesogona oxalina

Scientific classification
- Domain: Eukaryota
- Kingdom: Animalia
- Phylum: Arthropoda
- Class: Insecta
- Order: Lepidoptera
- Superfamily: Noctuoidea
- Family: Noctuidae
- Subfamily: Noctuinae
- Genus: Mesogona; Boisduval, 1840

= Mesogona =

Genus of moths

Mesogona is a genus of moths of the family Noctuidae.

== Species ==
- Mesogona acetosellae (Denis & Schiffermüller, 1775)
- Mesogona olivata (Harvey, 1874)
- Mesogona oxalina (Hübner, [1803])
- Mesogona rubra Crabo & Hammond, 1998
- Mesogona subcuprea Crabo & Hammond, 1998
