= Coniella diplodiella =

Scientific classification
- Kingdom: Fungi
- Division: Ascomycota
- Class: Sordariomycetes
- Order: Diaporthales
- Family: Schizoparmeaceae
- Genus: Coniella
- Species: C. diplodiella

Binomial name
- Coniella diplodiella (Speg.) Petr. & Syd., (1927)

Synonyms
- Coniothyrium diplodiella (Speg.) Sacc., (1884); Phoma diplodiella Speg., (1878); Pilidiella diplodiella (Speg.) Crous & Van Niekerk, (2004)

Species of fungus

Coniella diplodiella is a plant pathogen.
