= Colletotrichum fragariae =

Scientific classification
- Kingdom: Fungi
- Division: Ascomycota
- Class: Sordariomycetes
- Order: Glomerellales
- Family: Glomerellaceae
- Genus: Colletotrichum
- Species: C. fragariae

Binomial name
- Colletotrichum fragariae A.N.Brooks, (1931)

Synonyms
- Crown rot

Species of fungus

Anthracnose of strawberry
- Common names: Leaf spot of strawberry
- Causal agents: Colletotrichum fragariae
- Hosts: Strawberries
- EPPO Code: COLLFR

Colletotrichum fragariae is a fungal plant pathogen infecting strawberries. It is part of the Colletotrichum genus and leads to the disease known as anthracnose. This is typically at the crown of the strawberry, which is why it is often called crown rot. It is also known as the anthracnose crown rot. It is not a well-known fungus, and there are many similar fungi that are related to it.

The fungus also infects leaves and is known as leaf spot, which is common among all Colletotrichum. This is not as common in the fragariae, as it is more common in the crown. This fungus is also better at infecting younger strawberries/seedlings. The most common way to control this disease is fungicides that are harmful to the environment. There have been studies done to see if the fungus infects other hosts but other than some weeds, it is very specific to strawberries.

The occurrence of this fungus in strawberries fluctuates, and data can be found here. It is one of the more deadly pathogens to the strawberry, as once it is inside and affects the crown, the strawberry is no longer able to reproduce or be consumed.

== Morphology ==
The Colletotrichum fragariae is a very small, microscopic pathogen. It can be seen under microscopes. In a study by A.N. Brooks, the pathogen had tapering to the base, was about 24 × 4.5 μm, had 3–5 septate, but up to 9. It did occur in fascicles, sometimes sinuous, brown, apical cell hyaline or light brown. The apical cell tapers to an open, truncate apex, apical cells of mature setae functioning as phialides and producing conidia (Brooks, 1931). It also produces cylindrical conidia. There is no above ground body or fruiting body that this fungi makes.

== Ecology ==
The Colletotrichum fragariae is found in subtropical/tropical moist lowland forests and montane forests. It had been found in both North and South America and Asia. There are 66 records of this species in 5 countries. 85% of those were found in the US. Research has examined the preferred environment of this fungus and found that high soil fertility increases the ability for this fungus to grow.

== Reproduction ==
The Colletotrichum fragariae is a smaller fungus. It reproduces through asexual spores. This is true among all Colletotrichum genus fungi. Growth stages include: flowering stage, fruiting stage, post-harvest stage, seedling stage, and vegetative growing stage.

== See also ==
- List of strawberry diseases
