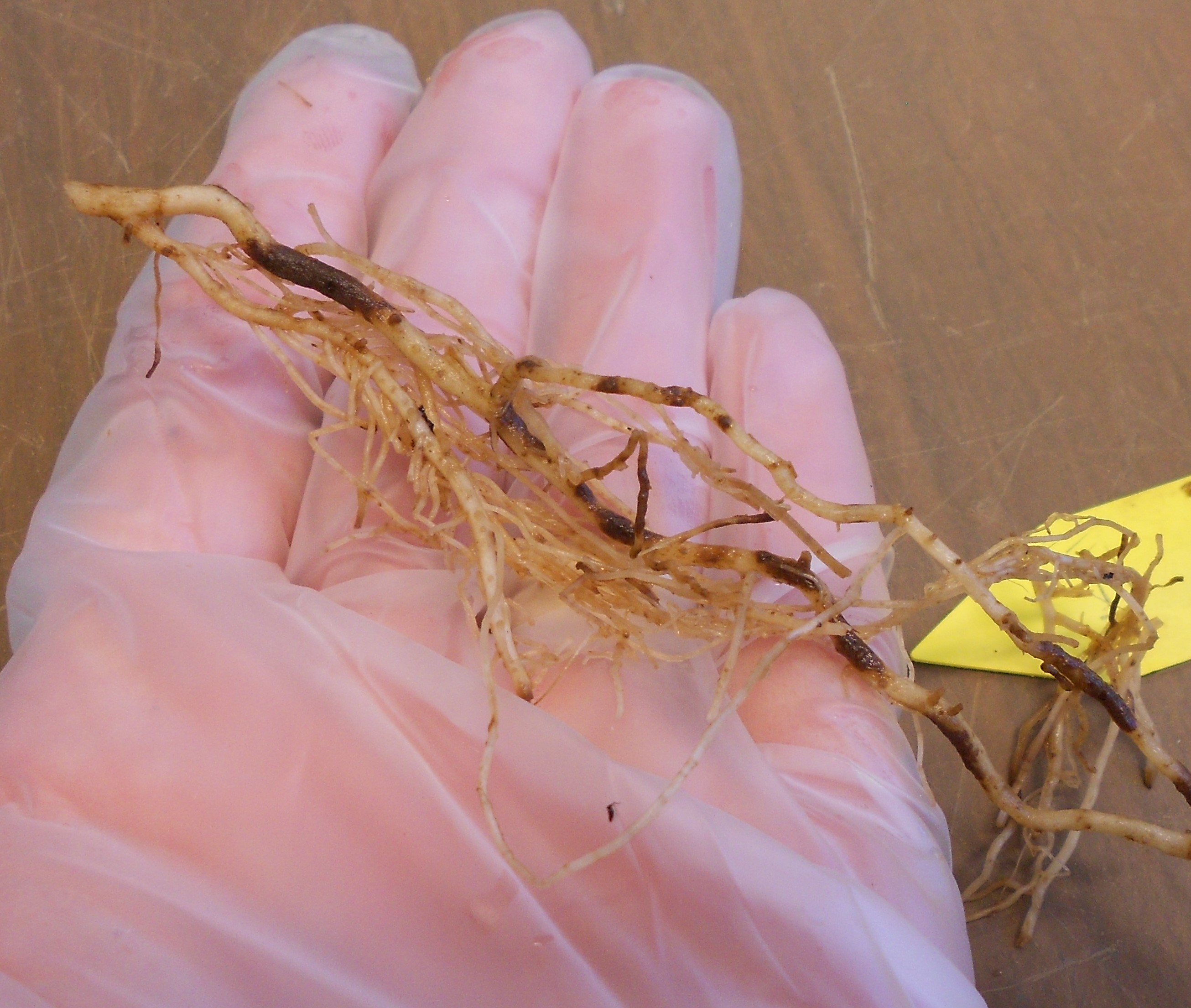
- Tomato roots showing symptoms of corky root rot

Scientific classification
- Kingdom: Fungi
- Division: Ascomycota
- Class: Dothideomycetes
- Order: Pleosporales
- Family: incertae sedis
- Genus: Pyrenochaeta
- Species: P. lycopersici

Binomial name
- Pyrenochaeta lycopersici R.W. Schneid. & Gerlach, (1966)

= Pyrenochaeta lycopersici =

Species of fungus

Pyrenochaeta lycopersici is a fungal plant pathogen, infecting tomatoes and causing corky root rot.

== Hosts and symptoms ==
The most susceptible host to Pyrenochaeta lycopersici is tomato, but the pathogen can also infect and cause damage to members of the families of Solanaceae and Cucurbitaceae such as pepper, eggplant, cucumber and melon. Wilt, stunting and lack of vigor can be observed as the primary symptoms, and infected leaves can possibly show interveinal chlorosis that leads to premature defoliation. The distinctive characteristic of P. lycopersici is that it causes brown lesions on the surface of medium roots which are known as a brown root rot. In addition, the pathogen produces corky lesions on the large roots while rotting can be observed in the small roots. Once the infection progresses, these lesions become wrinkled and dark brown, making cracks that prevent hosts from acquiring nutrients and water. These results are often followed by the root failure which causes the reduction of tomato yield.

== Disease cycle ==
Most of the disease cycle for Pyrenochaeta lycopersici is not completely understood. P. lycopersici is an ascomycete that has not been observed to have a teleomorph stage. It has been discovered that the pathogen is capable of producing pycnidia that produce conidia on conidiophores within the pycnidia. However, these pycnidia have never been observed on the infected plants in nature. P. lycopersici makes microsclerotia, which are survival structures, on the roots of host plants in soil. These microsclerotia can survive under harsh environments such as temperature changes and drought, and they can maintain the ability to infect other hosts in the soil for up to 15 years. Once the environment becomes favorable for the pathogen growth, germination will occur in microsclerotia that leads to the production of hyphae. The hyphae will penetrate and infect host roots through the epidermal cells. Approximately 48 hours after the primary infection, the infected cells begin to die, causing symptoms including necrosis. P. lycopersici keeps infecting neighboring cells until the roots are completely colonized, and corky root lesions can be observed upon its completion.

== Environment ==
The suitable soil temperature for Pyrenochaeta lycopersici to initiate the infection is in the range between 15 and 20 °C. As the temperature increases above 18 °C, it is observed that there is less infection caused by the pathogen. The corky root rot became one of the most serious diseases of tomato because growers used the inoculated soil without any type of disease management. For instance, this occurred in Sweden when monoculture of tomatoes resulted in a yield reduction of 30-40%.
