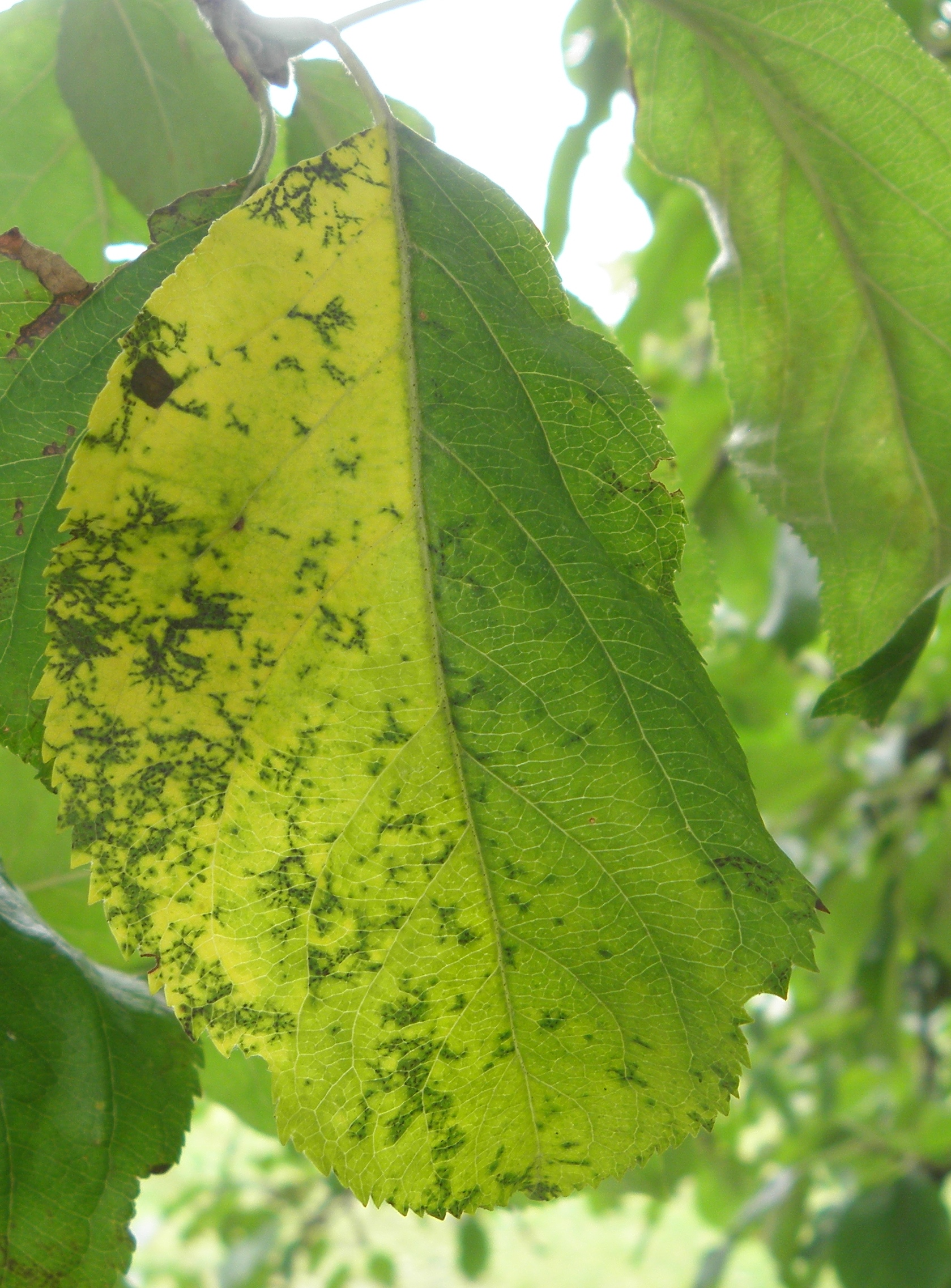

Scientific classification
- Kingdom: Fungi
- Division: Ascomycota
- Class: Leotiomycetes
- Order: Helotiales
- Family: Drepanopezizaceae
- Genus: Diplocarpon
- Species: D. coronariae

Binomial name
- Diplocarpon coronariae (Ellis & Davis) Wöhner & Rossman

Synonyms
- Ascochyta coronaria Ellis & Davis, (1903); Marssonina coronaria (Ellis & Davis) Davis, (1914); Diplocarpon mali Y. Harada & Sawamura, (1974)

= Diplocarpon coronariae =

Species of fungus

Diplocarpon coronariae is a plant pathogen that causes Marssonina blotch on apple.

== Marssonina blotch ==
Marssonina blotch is a fungal disease of apple leaves and fruit that is caused by Diplocarpon coronaria.

=== Distribution ===
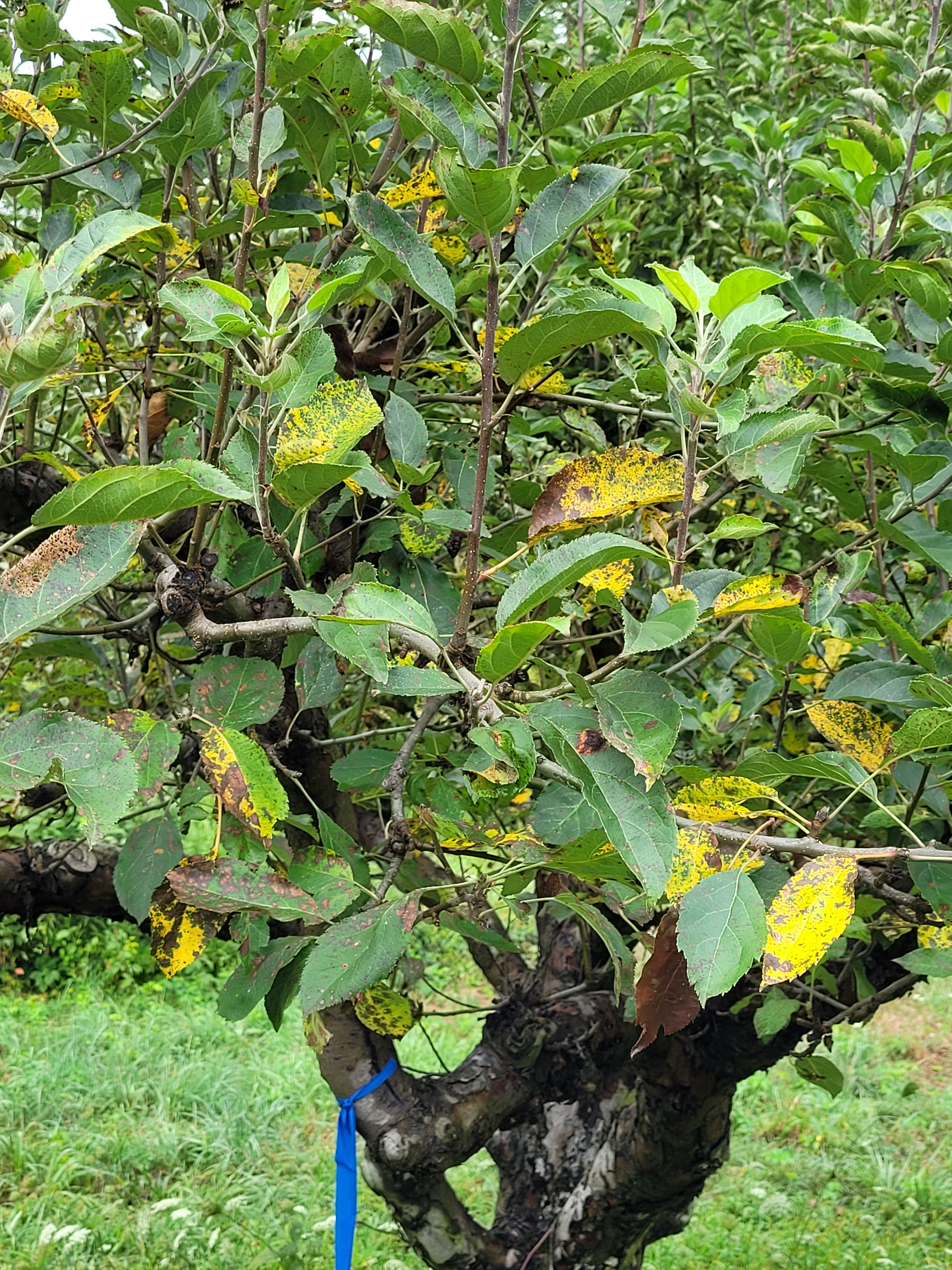
Marssonina blotch on a 'Rome' apple tree

Marssonina blotch was historically an important apple disease in Japan and China. In the 1990s it became an important apple disease in India, and Korea. Marssonina blotch was detected in Europe by the early 2000s where it caused widespread disease, especially on organically managed apples. In the United States Marssonina blotch was first observed as a serious disease in 2017.
