= Zygotorulaspora florentina =

Scientific classification
- Kingdom: Fungi
- Division: Ascomycota
- Class: Saccharomycetes
- Order: Saccharomycetales
- Family: Saccharomycetaceae
- Genus: Zygotorulaspora
- Species: Z. florentina

Binomial name
- Zygotorulaspora florentina (T. Castelli ex Kudryavtsev) Kurtzman

Synonyms
- Saccharomyces eupagycus (Sacch. ex Kudryavtsev) Van der Walt; Saccharomyces florentinus (T. Castelli) Lodder & Kreger-van Rij; Torulaspora eupagyca (Sacch. ex Kudryavtsev) Van der Walt & Johannsen; Torulaspora florentina (T. Castelli ex Kudryavtsev) Van der Walt & Johannsen; Zygosaccharomyces eupagycus Sacch. ex Kudryavtsev; Zygosaccharomyces florentinus . Castelli ex Kudryavtsev

Species of fungus

Zygotorulaspora florentina (formerly Zygosaccharomyces florentinus) is a plant pathogen. It was first described (as Zygosaccharomyces florentinus) in 1960 and transferred to Zygotorulaspora in 2003, initially under the incorrectly formed specific epithet florentinis.

== Genomics ==
A chromosome-level genome assembly of Zygotorulaspora florentina was published in 2026. The genome is approximately 11.1 Mb in size, with 8 chromosomes. The assembly has a BUSCO completeness of 99.6%, and 5,065 protein-coding genes were predicted.

== See also ==
- List of strawberry diseases
