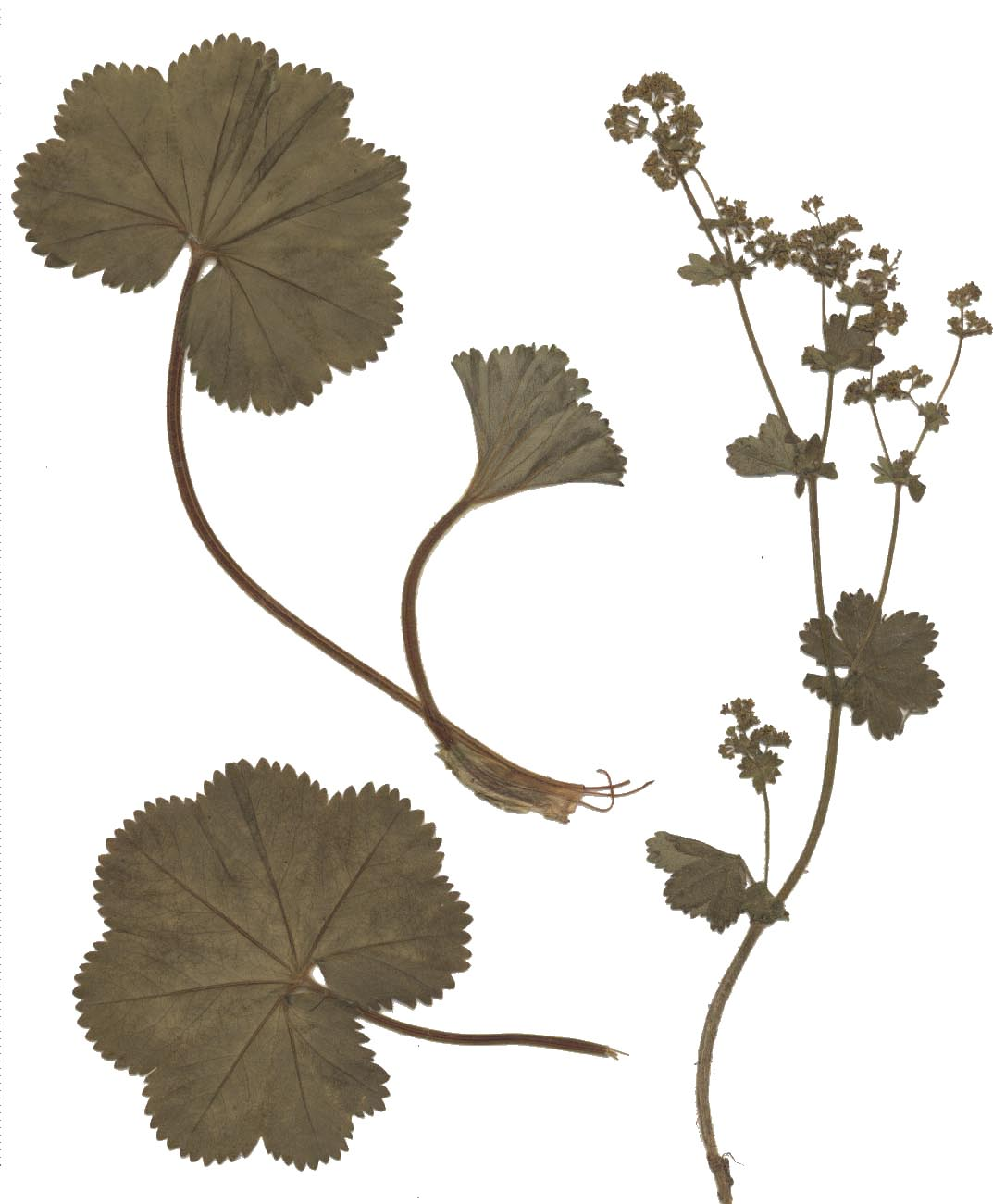

Scientific classification
- Kingdom: Plantae
- Clade: Tracheophytes
- Clade: Angiosperms
- Clade: Eudicots
- Clade: Rosids
- Order: Rosales
- Family: Rosaceae
- Genus: Alchemilla
- Species: A. filicaulis

Binomial name
- Alchemilla filicaulis Buser

= Alchemilla filicaulis =

Species of flowering plant

Alchemilla filicaulis is a species of plants belonging to the family Rosaceae.

It is native to Europe and Northern America. It is a known host species to at least two species of pathogenic fungi, Peronospora potentillae and Ramularia aplospora.
