= Penicillium rubrum =

Scientific classification
- Kingdom: Fungi
- Division: Ascomycota
- Class: Eurotiomycetes
- Order: Eurotiales
- Family: Aspergillaceae
- Genus: Penicillium
- Species: P. rubrum

Binomial name
- Penicillium rubrum Stoll, O. 1904

Type strain
- ATCC 52215, BCRC 31682, BIOURGE 412B, Biourge 412b, CBS 184.27, CCRC 31682, FRR 1057, IMI 094165, KCTC 6784, LHSB P164, LSHB P164, MUCL 29224, NRRL 1057, Thom 4894.13

Synonyms
- Talaromyces ruber, Penicillium crateriforme

Species of fungus

Penicillium rubrum is a species of fungus in the genus Penicillium which produces kojic acid, mitorubrin, mitorubrinol, rubratoxin A, rubratoxin B rubralactone, rubramin and occurs in grain corn and soybeans. Penicillium rubrum is similar to the species Penicillium chrysogenum.
