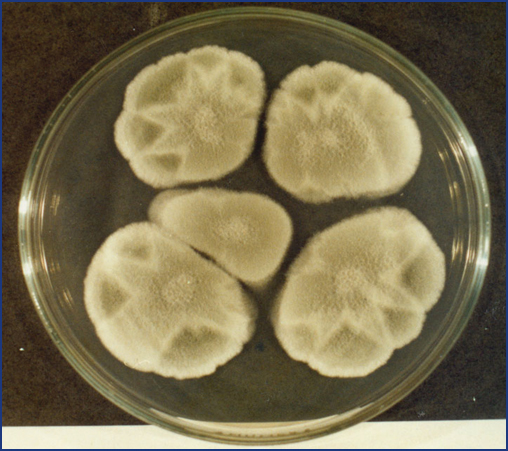
- Penicillium purpurogenum on potato dextrose agar

Scientific classification
- Kingdom: Fungi
- Division: Ascomycota
- Class: Eurotiomycetes
- Order: Eurotiales
- Family: Aspergillaceae
- Genus: Penicillium
- Species: P. purpurogenum

Binomial name
- Penicillium purpurogenum Stoll, (1923)

= Penicillium purpurogenum =

Species of fungus

Penicillium purpurogenum is a plant pathogen infecting strawberries. It produces rubratoxin B, a mycotoxin with anticarcinogenic properties, as well as monascus pigments.

== See also ==
- List of strawberry diseases
