= Discohainesia =

Scientific classification
- Kingdom: Fungi
- Division: Ascomycota
- Class: Leotiomycetes
- Order: Helotiales
- Family: Dermateaceae
- Genus: Discohainesia; Nannf.

Type species
- Discohainesia oenotherae (Cooke & Ellis) Nannf.

Genus of fungi

Discohainesia is a genus of fungi in the family Dermateaceae. This is a monotypic genus, containing the single species Discohainesia oenotherae which is a plant pathogen infecting caneberries, strawberries and geraniums.

== See also ==
- List of Dermateaceae genera
