= Gnomonia comari =

Scientific classification
- Kingdom: Fungi
- Division: Ascomycota
- Class: Sordariomycetes
- Order: Diaporthales
- Family: Gnomoniaceae
- Genus: Gnomonia
- Species: G. comari

Binomial name
- Gnomonia comari P. Karst., (1873)

Synonyms
- Apiognomonia guttulata (Starbäck) Wehm., (1942); Gloeosporium fragariae Arnaud; Gnomonia agrimoniae Bref. & Tavel; Gnomonia fragariae Kleb., (1918); Gnomonia fragariae f.sp. fructicola G. Arnaud, (1931); Gnomonia fragariae var. fructicola (G. Arnaud) Fallahyan, (1951); Gnomonia fructicola (G. Arnaud) Fall, (1951); Gnomonia guttulata (Starbäck) Kirschst., (1935); Gnomonia herbicola A.L. Sm., (1910); Gnomonia occulta Kirschst. Gnomonia pusilla Sacc. & Flageolet, (1905); Gnomoniella comari (P. Karst.) Sacc. Gnomoniella guttulata Starbäck, (1889); Phyllosticta grandimaculans Bubák & K. Krieg., (1912); Zythia fragariae Laib., (1908)

Species of fungus

Gnomonia comari is a fungus on overwintered leaves of Comarum palustre L. (Rosaceae). The fungus has been recently referred to Gnomoniopsis comari (Karst.) Sogonov, comb. nov. It occurs in Europe (Finland, Germany, Switzerland) It causes a disease on strawberry.

== See also ==
- List of strawberry diseases
