= Mesogona subcuprea =

Scientific classification
- Domain: Eukaryota
- Kingdom: Animalia
- Phylum: Arthropoda
- Class: Insecta
- Order: Lepidoptera
- Superfamily: Noctuoidea
- Family: Noctuidae
- Genus: Mesogona
- Species: M. subcuprea

Binomial name
- Mesogona subcuprea Crabo & Hammond, 1998

Species of moth

Mesogona subcuprea is a moth of the family Noctuidae. It is found in Washington, Oregon and California.

The length of the forewings is 19–21 mm. Adults are on wing from August to October.

Larvae have been reared on Quercus agrifolia and Quercus dumosa.
