= Rubratoxin =

Rubratoxins are hepatotoxic mycotoxin produced by Penicillium rubrum and Penicillium purpurogenum. Rubratoxin A and rubratoxin B have been known since 1950s. Rubratoxins are also known as protein phosphatase 2A (PP2A) specific inhibitor. The PP2A inhibitory activity of rubratoxin A is about 100-fold higher than rubratoxin B and rubratoxin A is now used as a chemical probe for PP2A research.

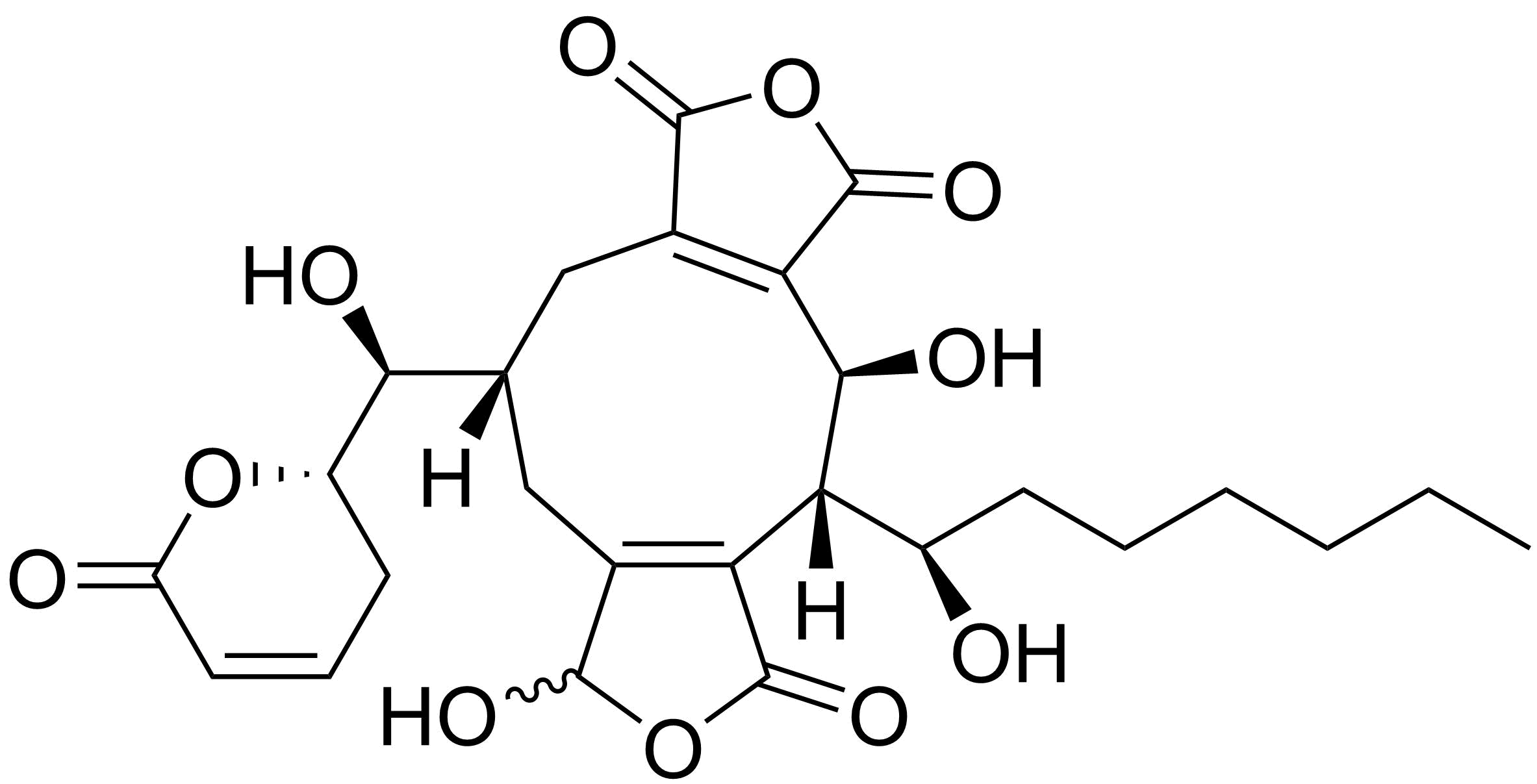
Rubratoxin A

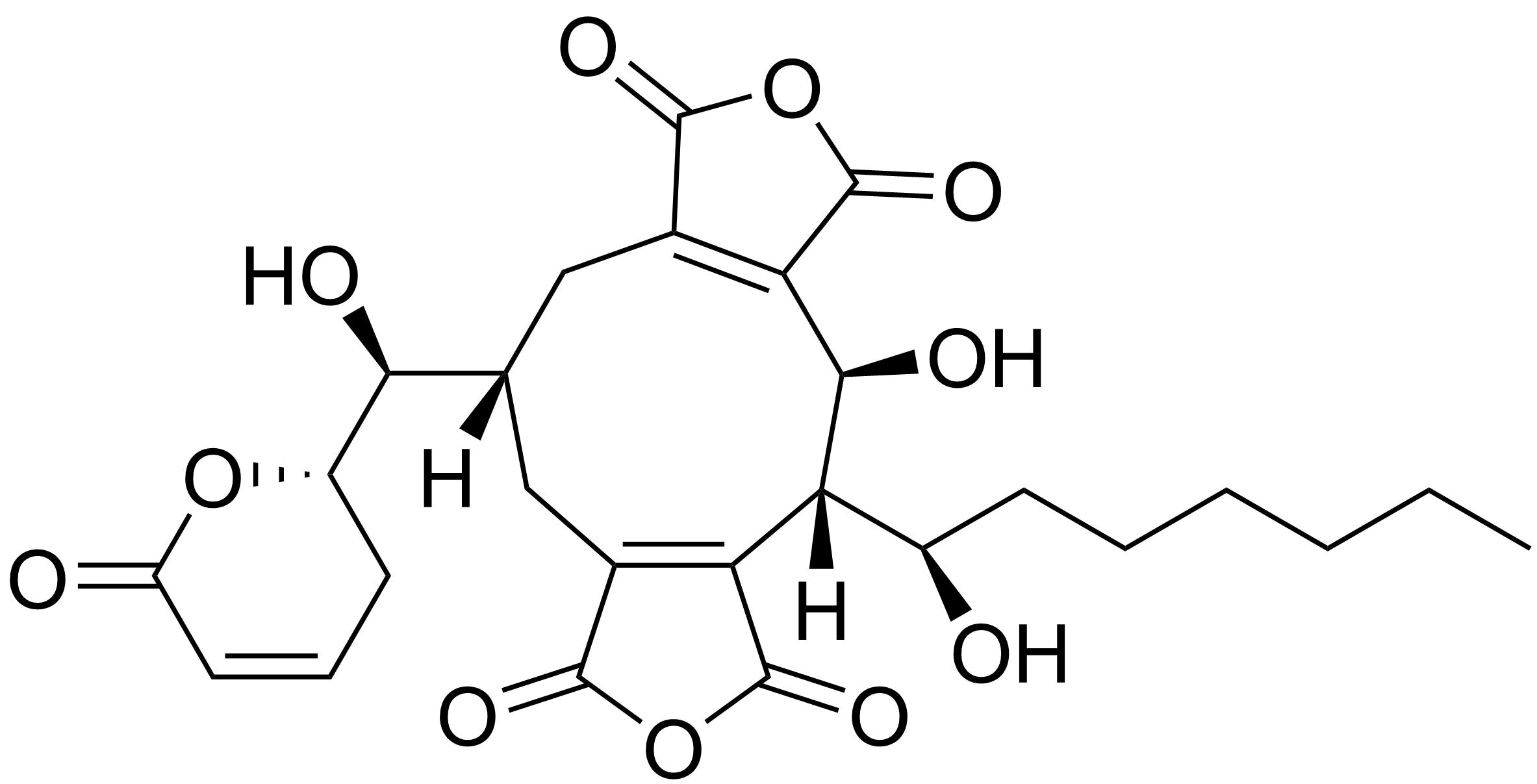
Rubratoxin B

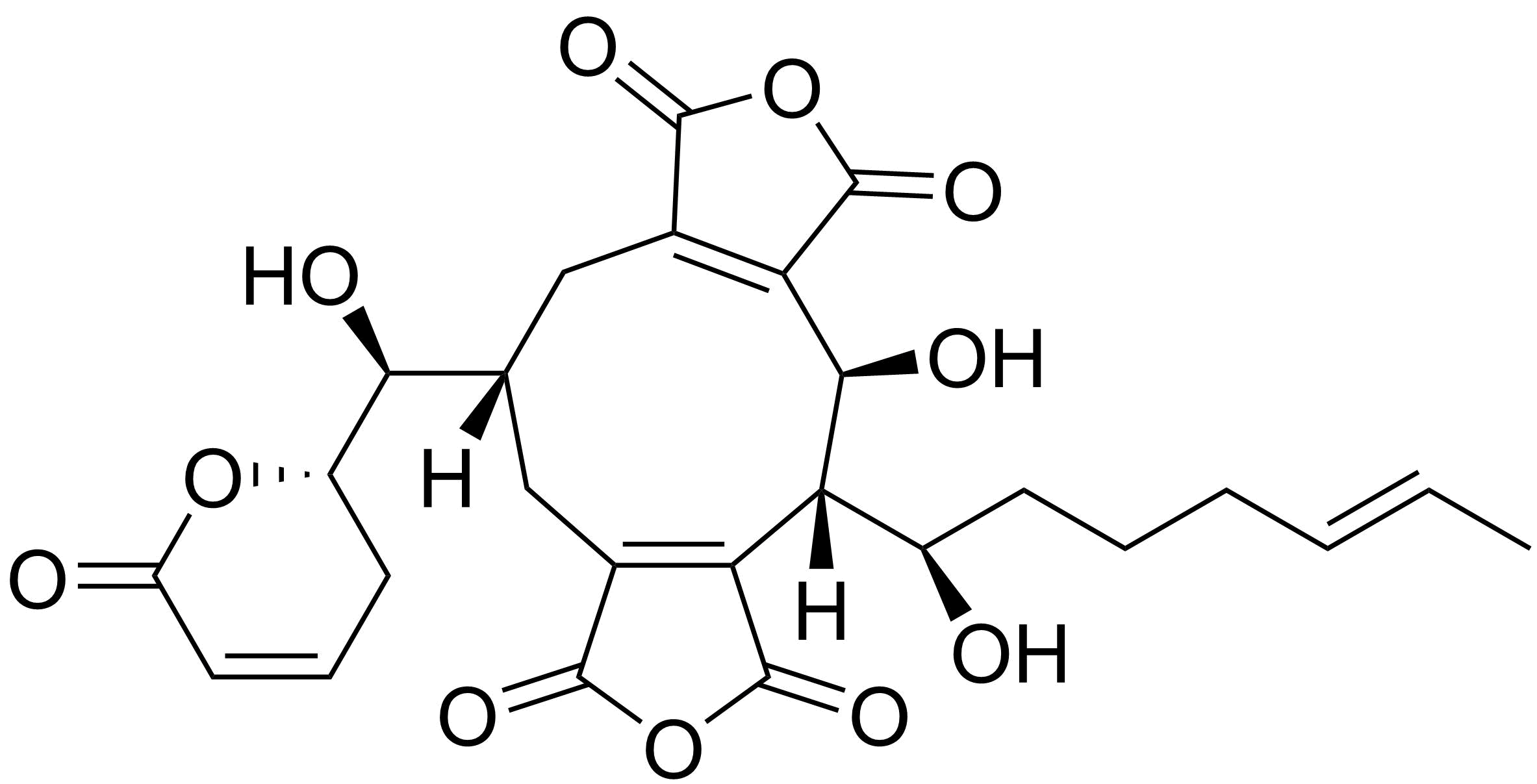
Rubratoxin C
