= Septoria fragariae =

Scientific classification
- Domain: Eukaryota
- Kingdom: Fungi
- Division: Ascomycota
- Class: Dothideomycetes
- Order: Capnodiales
- Family: Mycosphaerellaceae
- Genus: Septoria
- Species: S. fragariae

Binomial name
- Septoria fragariae Desm. (1842)

Species of fungus

Brown leaf spot of strawberry
- Causal agents: Septoria fragariae
- Hosts: Strawberries
- EPPO Code: SEPTFR

Septoria fragariae is a fungal plant pathogen affecting strawberries.

== See also ==
- List of strawberry diseases
