= Ovidiu Constantinescu =

Romanian mycologist (1933–2012)

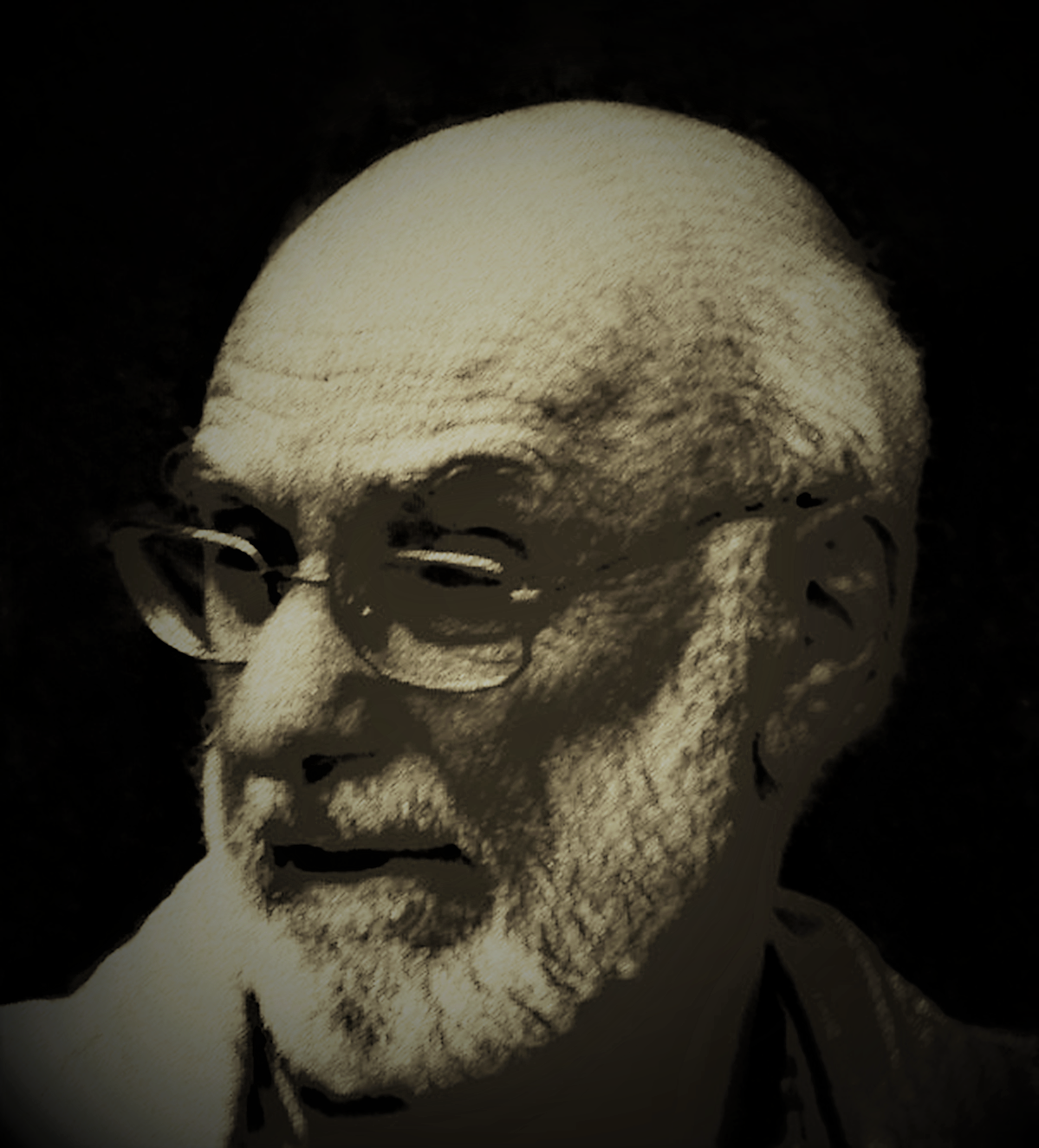

Ovidiu Constantinescu (1933 – January 23, 2012) was a Romanian mycologist known for his work on the taxonomy of the Peronosporales.

== Biography ==
Constantinescu was born in Constanța in 1933. He first graduated military school before ultimately enrolling at the Biological Institute at the University of Bucharest in 1949. Traian Săvulescu, founder of the institute, and his wife Alice advised Constantinescu while he was a student. Constantinescu graduated in 1970 from the institute. Following his thesis defense, he remained at the Institute as an assistant as well as the curator of the Mycological Herbarium there. Between 1976 and 1981 he edited the famous exsiccata Herbarium mycologicum Romanicum, at first with V. Bontea and later with G. Negrean. In 1974, Constantinescu published a book, Metode și tehnici în micologie, which was his first book on methods in mycology. Although it was never translated from Romanian, for its time it was widely recognized as one of the best mycological methods books. After working for one year in 1982 at the Centraalbureau voor Schimmelcultures in Baarn, Netherlands, he moved to Sweden in 1984. He was hired at the Institute for Systematic Botany at the University of Uppsala. Because of his vast knowledge and expertise about members of the order Peronosporales, he began the university's culture collection, known as Mykoteket. Constantinescu dedicated the next 20 years building up the collection for the university. He remained in Sweden at Uppsala University for the rest of his life working on members of the family Peronosporaceae, describing six new genera to add to the family after none had been added for over 30 years. He compiled and published an annotated list of over 500 species in the genus Peronospora in 1991. He is also known for describing new species of and working on downy mildew pathogens.

== Eponymous species ==
- Plasmopara constantinescui, Voglmayr & Thines, 2007
- Deightoniella constantinescui, Melnik & Shabunin, 2011

== Selected publications ==
- Bontea V, Constantinescu O. 1967. Herbarium Mycologicum Romanicum "Tr. Săvulescu". Schedae fasc. 36–37 (No. 1751–1850), 36 pp.
- Bontea V, Constantinescu O. 1968. Herbarium Mycologicum Romanicum "Tr. Săvulescu". Schedae fasc. I–XIX (No. 1–950), București. Pp. i–iv + 1–481.
- Bontea V, Constantinescu O. 1968. Herbarium Mycologicum Romanicum "Tr. Săvulescu". Schedae fasc. XX–XXXV (No. 951– 1750), and indexes for fasc. 1–35, București. Pp. i–ii, 481–957.
- Constantinescu O. 1974. Metode si tehnici in micologie. Bucuresti: Ceres. 215 pp.
- Constantinescu O. & Negrean, G. 1975. "Herbarium Mycologicum Romanicum". Schedae fasc. 46–50 (No. 2251–2500), 95 pp.
- Constantinescu, O.; van der Aa, H. A. (1982). "Phoma flavigena. New species from fresh water in Romania". Transactions of the British Mycological Society. 79 (2): 343–345. doi:10.1016/s0007-1536(82)80126-5.
- Constantinescu O. 1985. Notes on Pseudoperonospora. Mycotaxon 24: 301–311.
- Constantinescu O. 1991. An annotated list of Peronospora names. Thunbergia 15: 1–110.
- Constantinescu O. 2004. The nomenclature of Plasmopara (Chromista, Peronosporales) parasitic on Geraniaceae. Taxon 53: 523–525.
- Lane CR, Beales PA, O'Neill TM, McPherson GM, Finlay AR, David J, Constantinescu O & Henricot B. 2005. First report of Impatiens downy mildew (Plasmopara obducens) in the UK. Pl. Pathol. 54: 243.
- Constantinescu O, Thines M. 2010. Plasmopara halstedii is absent from Australia and New Zealand. Polish Bot. J. 55: 293–298.
