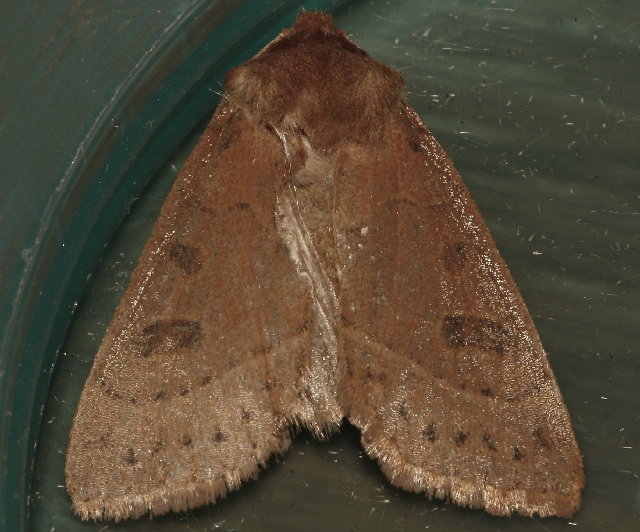

Scientific classification
- Domain: Eukaryota
- Kingdom: Animalia
- Phylum: Arthropoda
- Class: Insecta
- Order: Lepidoptera
- Superfamily: Noctuoidea
- Family: Noctuidae
- Genus: Mesogona
- Species: M. olivata

Binomial name
- Mesogona olivata (Harvey, 1874)

Synonyms
- Glaea olivata Harvey, 1874; Choephora blanda Grote, 1876a; Pseudoglaea blanda Grote, 1876b; Pseudoglaea taedata Grote, 1876b; Cerastis olivata Grote, 1878; Pseudoglaea decepta Grote, 1881; Metalepsis blanda Dyar, 1903; Metalepsis taedata Dyar, 1903; Metalepsis decepta Dyar, 1903; Mythimna blanda Hampson, 1903; Mythimna taedata Hampson, 1903; Mythimna decepta Hampson, 1903; Spectraglaea olivata Hampson, 1906; Mythimna olivata Barnes & McDunnough, 1917; Pseudoglaea olivata McDunnough, 1927

= Mesogona olivata =

Species of moth

Mesogona olivata is a moth of the family Noctuidae. It is found from southern coastal and interior British Columbia south through California, Colorado and Texas. It most likely also occurs in northern Mexico.

The wingspan is about 36 mm. Adults are on wing from August to November.

The larvae feed on various deciduous shrubs and trees, including poplar, oak, hazel, amelanchier, alder, antelope brush, Symphoricarpos, and Berberis. It has been reared from Quercus garryana, Ceanothus velutinus and Quercus agrifolia.
