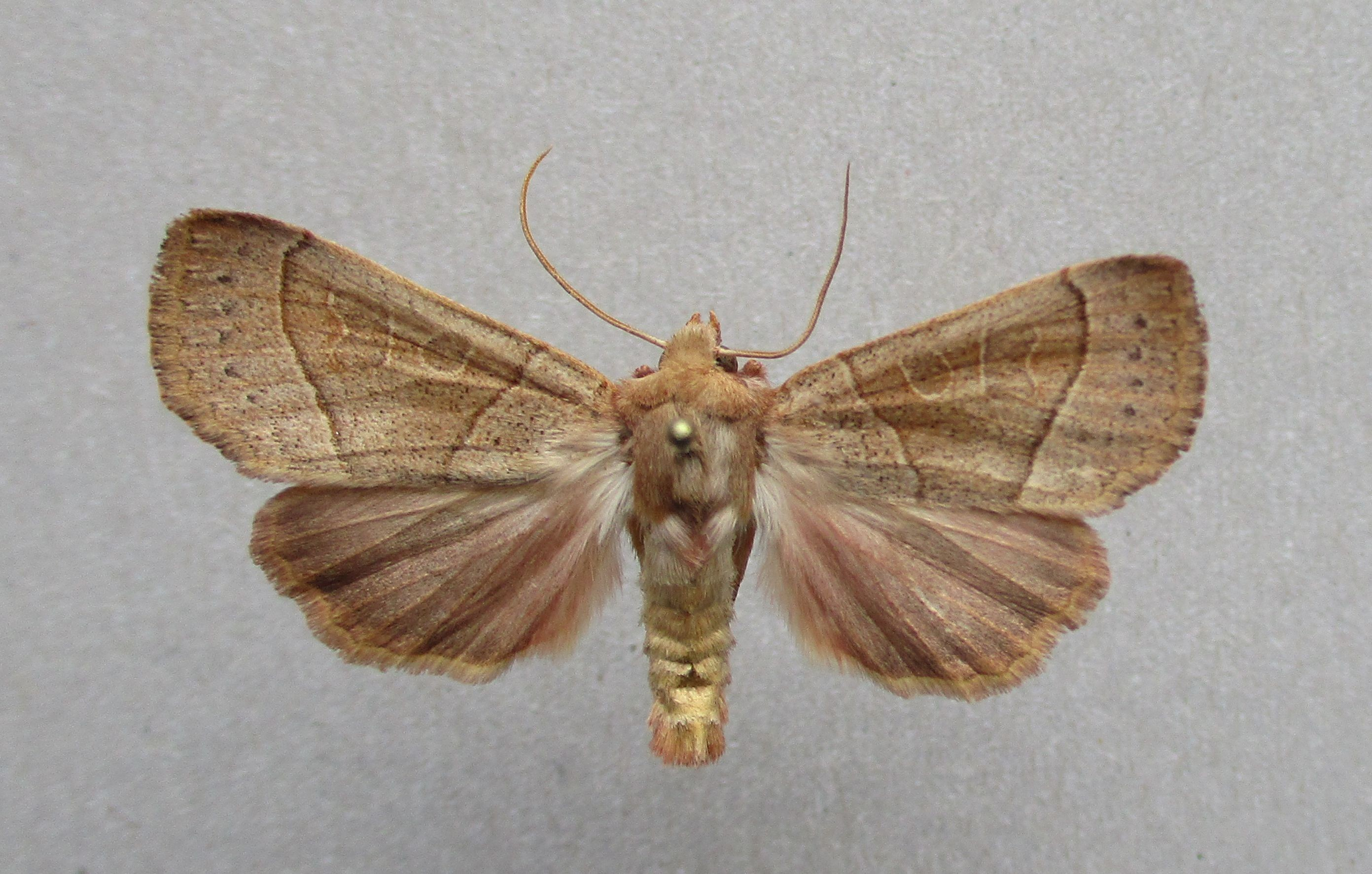

Scientific classification
- Domain: Eukaryota
- Kingdom: Animalia
- Phylum: Arthropoda
- Class: Insecta
- Order: Lepidoptera
- Superfamily: Noctuoidea
- Family: Noctuidae
- Genus: Mesogona
- Species: M. acetosellae

Binomial name
- Mesogona acetosellae (Denis & Schiffermüller, 1775)

Synonyms
- Noctua acetosellae Denis & Schiffermüller, 1775; Mesogona eremicola Staudinger, 1871; Mesogona segoviensis Calle, 1982; Mesogona rufescens Schuring, 1918; Mesogona acetosellae f. vorbrodti Wehrli, 1917; Mamestra acetosellae f. conspersa Dannehl, 1926; Mesogona acetosellae var. grisea Dannehl, 1929

= Mesogona acetosellae =

Species of moth

The pale stigma (Mesogona acetosellae) is a moth of the family Noctuidae. It is found in central and southern Europe, Turkey, the Caucasus, Armenia, Kazakhstan and from western Siberia to the Altai.

== Description ==
The wingspan is 40–44 mm. Forewing greyish ochreous, flushed with brownish or rufous, and with dark irroration; lines pale with dark edging, approximating on inner margin; upper stigmata large with pale outlines: a submarginal row of dark spots between the veins; hindwing greyish ochreous, paler towards base: palpi pink, abdomen ochraceous. The form found in Siberia, eremicola Stgr, is paler, but covered with black striations. Larva dull flesh colour, dusted with black: dorsal line dull ochreous; head and thoracic plate brown.

== Biology ==
Adults are on wing from August to September depending on the location. There is one generation per year.

The larvae feed on Prunus spinosa, Quercus, Crataegus and Populus species.

== Subspecies ==
- Mesogona acetosellae acetosellae
- Mesogona acetosellae anatolica (Turkey)
