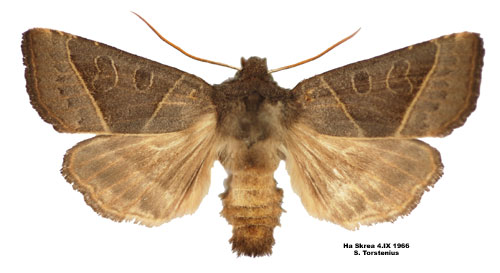

Scientific classification
- Kingdom: Animalia
- Phylum: Arthropoda
- Clade: Pancrustacea
- Class: Insecta
- Order: Lepidoptera
- Superfamily: Noctuoidea
- Family: Noctuidae
- Genus: Mesogona
- Species: M. oxalina

Binomial name
- Mesogona oxalina (Hübner, [1803])

Synonyms
- Noctua oxalina Hübner, [1803]; Mesogona nigriuscula Krulikowsky, 1893; Mesogona rufescens Schawerda, 1907; Mesogona unipuncta Kiefer, 1916; Mesogona rosea Dannehl, 1926; Mesogona obscurata Dannehl, 1926; Mesogona privata Dahnehl, 1926

= Mesogona oxalina =

Species of moth

Mesogona oxalina is a moth of the family Noctuidae. It is found in southern and central Europe, north to Fennoscandia, east to the Baltic States and Russia (up to the Ural), south to the Iberian Peninsula, Italy and Greece.

The wingspan is 34–39 mm. Adults are on wing from August to September depending on the location.

The larvae feed on Alnus, Populus, Prunus and Salix species.
