= Hansenula subpelliculosa =

Scientific classification
- Kingdom: Fungi
- Division: Ascomycota
- Class: Pichiomycetes
- Order: Pichiales
- Family: Pichiaceae
- Genus: Pichia
- Species: P. subpelliculosa

Binomial name
- Pichia subpelliculosa Bedford, (1942)

Species of fungus

Hansenula subpelliculosa is a plant pathogen.
