= Coniella =

Scientific classification
- Kingdom: Fungi
- Division: Ascomycota
- Class: Sordariomycetes
- Order: Diaporthales
- Family: Schizoparmeaceae
- Genus: Coniella; Höhnel, 1918

Species
- Coniella australiensis; Coniella castaneicola; Coniella citri; Coniella clypeata; Coniella costae; Coniella cupressacearum; Coniella delicata; Coniella diplodiella; Coniella duckerae; Coniella eucalypti; Coniella eucalypticola; Coniella fragariae; Coniella fusiformis; Coniella genistae; Coniella granati; Coniella macrospora; Coniella miniata; Coniella minima; Coniella musaiaensis; Coniella musaiensis; Coniella oryzae; Coniella petrakii; Coniella petrakioidea; Coniella populina; Coniella pulchella; Coniella simba; Coniella terminaliae

Genus of fungi

Coniella is a fungus genus in the family Schizoparmeaceae (or Schizoparmaceae), which contains 65 species recorded in the database Mycobank. This genus Coniella are reported as a typical plant pathogenic fungi for grape, eucalyptus and several plant. It mainly found in Europe, Asian, also South Africa. less report in American, only one paper published new spaces founded.

The first fungus belonging to Coniella genus was Coniella pulchella, established by Von Hoehnel in 1918. (Von H.hnel 1918) Alvarez, regarded genera Pilidiella and Schizoparme together with Coniella as synonyms. (Alvarez, Groenewald et al. 2016) As typical plant pathogenic fungi and due to globalization, Coniella occur worldwide as plant pathogens. Coniella vitis and Coniella diplodiella are two common pathogens that cause white rot disease in grapevines. Coniella granati induces crown rot and fruit rot in pomegranates in Central Asia. In northern Australia, several species of Coniella have been reported to cause foliage blight on eucalyptus trees. Several Coniella fungi from South Africa are harmful for grapevine cultivation. In 2015, Coniella fragariae was reported as the causal agent for strawberry crown rot in Latvia. Fewer reports about Coniella come from north and south America, but Coniella lustricola was isolated as a new species from submerged detritus in Black Moshannon State Park in Pennsylvania, USA. Considerable research on this genus of fungi has been published in the field of agriculture and biology but there are far few reports about the secondary metabolites of Coniella. In the chemical constitution study, two paper reported azaphilone are the main metabolites.
