= Septogloeum potentillae =

Scientific classification
- Kingdom: Fungi
- Division: Ascomycota
- Class: incertae sedis
- Order: incertae sedis
- Family: incertae sedis
- Genus: Septogloeum
- Species: S. potentillae

Binomial name
- Septogloeum potentillae Allesch. (1896)

Species of fungus

Septogloeum potentillae is an ascomycete fungus that is a plant pathogen infecting strawberries. The species' validity is considered unconfirmed by GBIF, as it has very few occurrences, and has not been described in published literature for over a century.
