= Mesogona rubra =

Scientific classification
- Domain: Eukaryota
- Kingdom: Animalia
- Phylum: Arthropoda
- Class: Insecta
- Order: Lepidoptera
- Superfamily: Noctuoidea
- Family: Noctuidae
- Genus: Mesogona
- Species: M. rubra

Binomial name
- Mesogona rubra Crabo & Hammond, 1998

Species of moth

Mesogona rubra is a moth of the family Noctuidae. It is found in the Cascade Mountains north to Skamania County, Washington, in the Klamath Mountains, on the Pacific coast from central Oregon to central California, and in the Sierra Nevada.

The length of the forewings is 18–21 mm.

The larvae feed on Arctostaphylos columbiana and probably other Arctostaphylos species.
