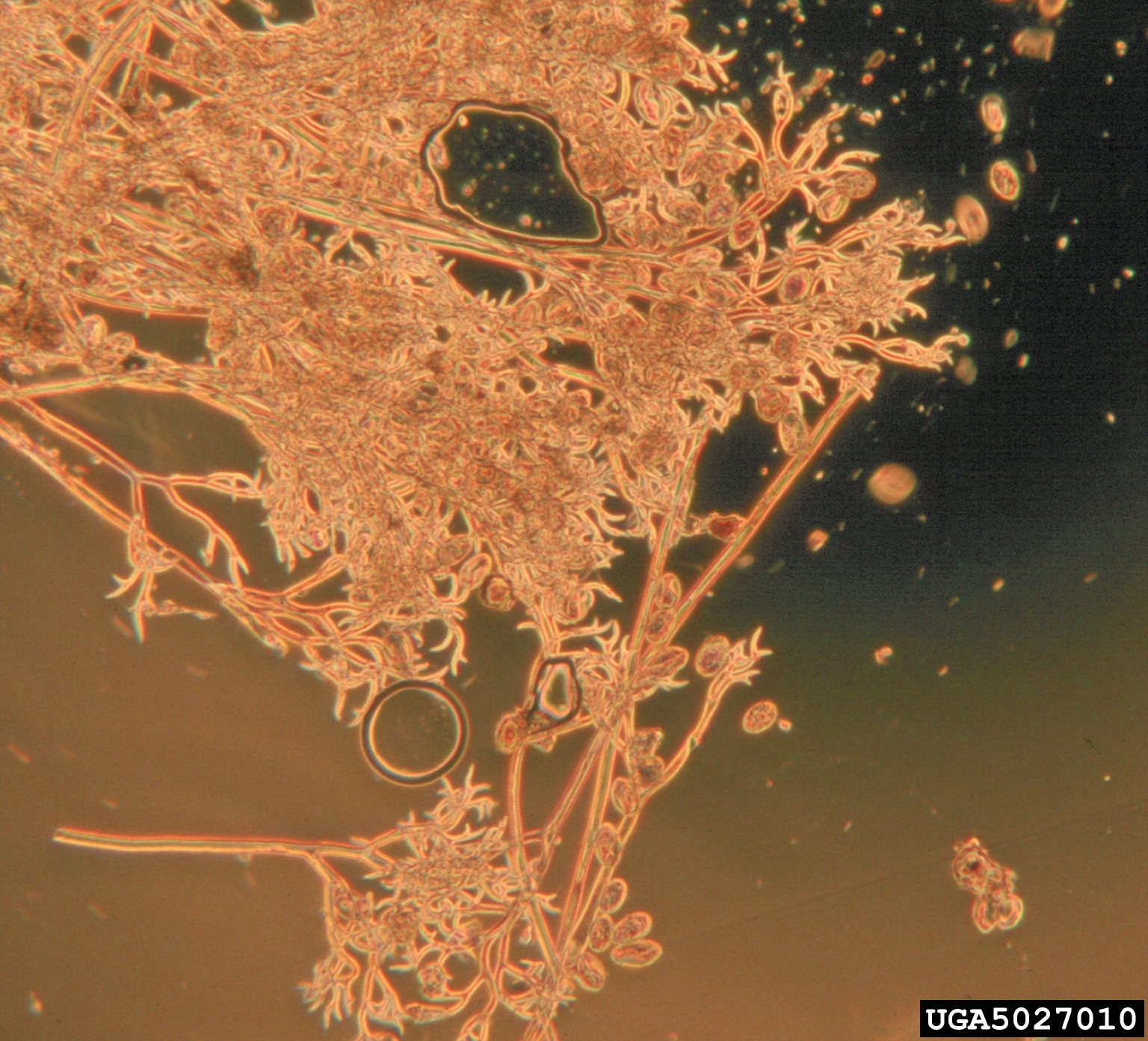
- Peronospora potentillae

Scientific classification
- Domain: Eukaryota
- Clade: Sar
- Clade: Stramenopiles
- Phylum: Oomycota
- Class: Peronosporomycetes
- Order: Peronosporales
- Family: Peronosporaceae
- Genus: Peronospora
- Species: P. potentillae

Binomial name
- Peronospora potentillae de Bary, (1863)

= Peronospora potentillae =

Species of single-celled organism

Peronospora potentillae is a plant pathogen infecting strawberries. It also infects Alchemilla filicaulis.
