= Pyrenochaeta terrestris =

Scientific classification
- Kingdom: Fungi
- Division: Ascomycota
- Class: Dothideomycetes
- Order: Pleosporales
- Family: incertae sedis
- Genus: Pyrenochaeta
- Species: P. terrestris

Binomial name
- Pyrenochaeta terrestris (H.N. Hansen) Gorenz, J.C. Walker & Larson, (1948)

Synonyms
- Phoma terrestris H.N. Hansen, (1929)

Species of fungus

Pyrenochaeta terrestris is a fungal plant pathogen that infects maize, sweet potatoes, and strawberries. This plant pathogen causes a disease in onion (Allium cepa) that is commonly called pink root. P. terrestris is also known to infect shallots, garlic, leeks, chives, cantaloupe, carrots, cauliflower, cowpea, cucumbers, eggplants, lima beans, millet, oats, peas, peppers, potatoes, spinach, sugarcane, and tomatoes. Other names for this pathogen include Setophoma terrestris and Phoma terrestris these names are synonyms of Pyrenochaeta terrestris.

== Description ==
P. terrestris produces dark brown to black pycnidia that have setae with one to five septa and are 8-120 μm long. Setae mostly occur around the ostiole, but may grow anywhere on the pycnidium. Pycnidiospores are hyaline, oblong to ovoid, biguttulate, and sessile in the pycnidium; they ooze from ruptures or through the ostiole. The mycelium formed by this fungus is septate, branching, and hyaline. If the fungus grows on wheat straw or cellulose, it produces a pink pigment that is a prominent characteristic of the resultant disease. P. terrestris also produces several toxins.

== Host range and distribution ==
P. terrestris has been documented as a widespread saprophyte and a weak parasite to a lot of hosts. The biggest losses caused by this disease are usually from a disease complex including the genii Fusarium, Pythium, Rhizoctonia and Helminthosporium. "In 1941 it was reported to survive on soybean, pea, cane, millet, oats, barley, wheat, corn, squash, cucumber, cantaloupe, muskmelon, tomato, pepper, eggplant, cauliflower, carrot, spinach, and onion with reports of high disease to no disease damage". P. terrestris is adapted to temperate, sub-temperate, and tropical climates due to its ability to survive in a broad range of pH, temperatures, and soil types.

== Disease cycle and epidemiology ==
P. terrestris can survive as deep as 45 cm in the soil. It will survive in the soil as a pycnidia spore, in plant roots, or plant debris of susceptible disease. Seeds cannot be infected. The root tips of onions are penetrated directly by hyphae. Colonies of the fungus will grow on the root or a few centimeters away from the root tip. The fungus will extend throughout the root system, but the pathogen does not infect the basal stem plate or scales of the bulb. Ideal soil temperature for this pathogen and development of the disease is 24-28 degrees Celsius. Plants infected early in the season develop a poor root system that cannot keep up with water uptake during hot temperatures; this results in great yield loss.

== Pink root ==
Pink root is a plant disease that is caused by P. terrestris. This disease is very devastating to onion production in warmer climates.

=== Symptoms ===
Infected roots are initially a light pink, yellow, or yellow-brownish color. As the disease progresses, the root color turns a darker pink, then red, and lastly purple. In the later stages of disease, the roots can become transparent and water soaked, and they eventually disintegrate. New roots that form will also become infected, turn pink, and then die. Infected plants start bulbing earlier than non-infected plants, and their leaf size and number are reduced. Seedlings that become infected can be killed. Plants that survive pink root become stunted and undersized and therefore not marketable. Plants that survive the infection will produce seed with a lowered biomass and germination rate.

=== Disease management and control ===
Crop rotation is an effective tool for controlling pink root. It is suggested to rotate planting onion every 3–6 years with crops that are not susceptible to P. terrestris. This will reduce but not eliminate the primary inoculum source. Planting cultivars of onion that are resistant to the P. terrestris pathogen is a very effective management strategy that can be used in all commercial operations. However the pathogen biology can vary based on location meaning that not all resistant onions will work in all locations.

Another method of management is soil solarization. This method has shown to be effective in areas like the San Joaquin Valley, where onions are planted in fall after a summer fallow period.

"Fumigation with metam sodium or chloropicrin can be effective against some strains of the fungus, but its effects can vary. Fumigation is also not always economical unless a high value seed crop is being grown."

Management practices such as decreasing the irrigation interval have been shown to increase yield in Sudan as well.

Studies done in 1997 showed promising results for resistant cultivars. At the seedling stage they were entirely resistant and then began to show signs of a reduced infection towards maturity.
