= Pythium middletonii =

Scientific classification
- Domain: Eukaryota
- Clade: Sar
- Clade: Stramenopiles
- Phylum: Oomycota
- Class: Peronosporomycetes
- Order: Peronosporales
- Family: Pythiaceae
- Genus: Pythium
- Species: P. middletonii

Binomial name
- Pythium middletonii Sparrow, (1960)

Synonyms
- Eupythium proliferum (de Bary) Nieuwl., (1916); Pythium proliferum de Bary, (1860); Pythium proliferum Schenk, (1859)

Species of single-celled organism

Pythium middletonii is a plant pathogen infecting strawberry.
