= Pichia subpelliculosa =

Scientific classification
- Kingdom: Fungi
- Division: Ascomycota
- Class: Saccharomycetes
- Order: Saccharomycetales
- Family: Pichiaceae
- Genus: Pichia
- Species: P. subpelliculosa

Binomial name
- Pichia subpelliculosa Kurtzman, (1984)

Species of fungus

Pichia subpelliculosa is a plant pathogen found in wineries and vineyards and also infecting strawberries.
