= Pilidiella quercicola =

Scientific classification
- Kingdom: Fungi
- Division: Ascomycota
- Class: Sordariomycetes
- Order: Diaporthales
- Family: Melanconidaceae
- Genus: Pilidiella
- Species: P. quercicola

Binomial name
- Pilidiella quercicola (Oudem.) Petr. (1927)

Synonyms
- Sphaeropsis quercicola

Species of fungus

Pilidiella quercicola is a plant pathogen infecting strawberries.
