= Rubratoxin B =

Names
- Preferred IUPAC name (4R,5S,10S)-10-{(S)-[(2S)-3,6-Dihydro-6-oxopyran-2-yl](hydroxy)methyl}-4-hydroxy-5-[(1R)-1-hydroxyheptyl]-5,9,10,11-tetrahydro-1H-cyclonona[1,2-c:5,6-c′]difuran-1,3,6,8(4H)-tetrone

Identifiers
CAS Number	21794-01-4
3D model (JSmol)	Interactive image
ChEBI	CHEBI:80714
ChemSpider	10142953
ECHA InfoCard	100.040.514
EC Number	244-582-6
KEGG	C16767
PubChem CID	11969548
UNII	J38U4758MY
CompTox Dashboard (EPA)	DTXSID601019060
- InChI: InChI=1S/C26H30O11/c1-2-3-4-5-7-15(27)20-18-13(23(31)36-25(18)33)10-12(21(29)16-8-6-9-17(28)35-16)11-14-19(22(20)30)26(34)37-24(14)32/h6,9,12,15-16,20-22,27,29-30H,2-5,7-8,10-11H2,1H3/t12-,15+,16-,20+,21-,22-/m0/s1 Key: ZJTBTDVZNGBSNG-RETZLTROSA-N
- SMILES: CCCCCC[C@H]([C@H]1[C@H](C2=C(C[C@H](CC3=C1C(=O)OC3=O)[C@@H]([C@@H]4CC=CC(=O)O4)O)C(=O)OC2=O)O)O

Properties
Chemical formula	C_{26}H_{30}O_{11}
Molar mass	518.515 g·mol^{−1}
- Except where otherwise noted, data are given for materials in their standard state (at 25 °C [77 °F], 100 kPa). Infobox references

Rubratoxin B is a mycotoxin of the rubratoxin class with anticancer activity. It is made by the fungus Penicillium rubrum. It has been reported to elicit antioxidative and DNA repair responses in mouse brain.
