= Coniella fragariae =

Scientific classification
- Kingdom: Fungi
- Division: Ascomycota
- Class: Sordariomycetes
- Order: Diaporthales
- Family: Schizoparmeaceae
- Genus: Coniella
- Species: C. fragariae

Binomial name
- Coniella fragariae (Oudem.) B. Sutton, (1977)

Synonyms
- Coniothyrium fragariae Oudem., (1883)

Species of fungus

- Causal agents: Coniella fragariae
- Hosts: eucalypts
- Distribution: Brazil, India, China and Australia

Coniella fragariae is a plant pathogen. It is known to be pathogenic on eucalypts in a number of countries, including Brazil, India, China and Australia. In 2015, Coniella fragariae was reported as the causal agent for strawberry crown rot in Latvia. In 2018, the fungus was isolated from a goose dung collected in a strawberry field near the sea coast in North Germany. Inferred from the author, it should be a typical plant pathogenic fungus not coprophilous fungus. The plants, strawberry that had been eaten by geese are expected to be the true source of Coniella fragariae. Chemical constitution study showed azaphilone were the main secondary metabolites from this fungus.
