= Coniella castaneicola =

Scientific classification
- Kingdom: Fungi
- Division: Ascomycota
- Class: Sordariomycetes
- Order: Diaporthales
- Family: Schizoparmeaceae
- Genus: Coniella
- Species: C. castaneicola

Binomial name
- Coniella castaneicola (Ellis & Everh.) B. Sutton, (1980)

Synonyms
- Anthasthoopa simba Subram. & K. Ramakr., (1956); Asteromella castaneicola (Ellis & Everh.) Petr., (1958); Coniella simba (Subram. & K. Ramakr.) B. Sutton, (1969); Dothidella castaneicola (Ellis & Everh.) Bonar [as 'castanicola'], (1928); Gloeosporium castaneicola Ellis & Everh. [as 'castanicola'], (1895); Phyllosticta castaneicola Ellis & Everh. [as 'castanicola'] Pilidiella castaneicola (Ellis & Everh.) Arx [as 'castaniicola'], (1957)

Species of fungus

Coniella castaneicola is a plant pathogen.
