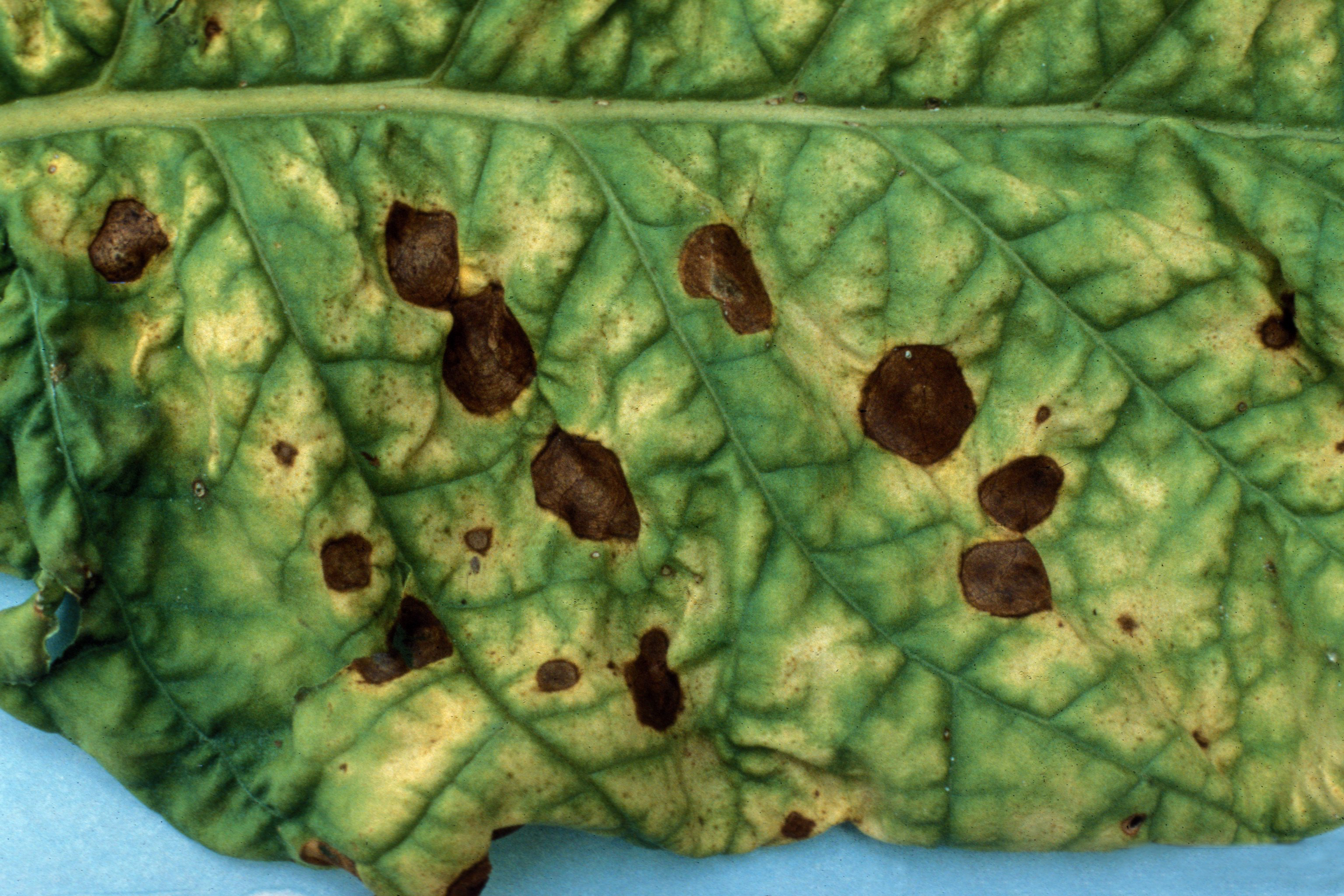

Scientific classification
- Kingdom: Fungi
- Division: Ascomycota
- Class: Dothideomycetes
- Order: Pleosporales
- Family: Pleosporaceae
- Genus: Alternaria
- Species: A. alternata

Binomial name
- Alternaria alternata (Fr.) Keissl. (1912)

Synonyms
- Alternaria fasciculata (Cooke & Ellis) L.R. Jones & Grout (1897); Alternaria rugosa McAlpine (1896); Alternaria tenuis Nees (1817); Macrosporium fasciculatum Cooke & Ellis (1817); Torula alternata Fr. (1832)

= Alternaria alternata =

Pathogenic fungus

Alternaria alternata is a fungus causing leaf spots, rots, and blights on many plant parts, and other diseases. It is an opportunistic pathogen on over 380 host species of plant.

It can also cause upper respiratory tract infections and asthma in humans with compromised immunity.

== Hosts and symptoms ==
Alternaria alternata has many different hosts depending on its forma specialis. Alternaria alternata f.sp. cucurbitae infects cucurbits. Alternaria alternata f.sp. fragariae infects strawberries.

Alternaria alternata f.sp. lycopersici (AAL) infects only certain cultivars of tomato plants and is often referred to as Alternaria stem canker of tomato. AAL's main symptom is cankers in the stem. It resides in seeds and seedlings, and is often spread by spores as they become airborne and land on plants. It can also spread throughout other plants. Under severe infection, lesions enlarge and become coalesced causing blighting of the leaves. This symptom progression occurred in research done in Pakistan: the symptoms on affected tomatoes started with yellowing and browning of the lower leaves, then began developing on the leaf tips and along the margins of the leaf petiole. This progression continued until the entire leaves were covered in diseased tissue and then fell off. In addition to necrotic leaves and petioles, plants are found to have severe defoliation, with considerable yield losses when it occurs before flowering. The tomato fruit can also be infected as well, with brown cankers dotting them and making them inedible. Once the disease has spread to a certain point, little can be done to save the tomato plant.

There are several host factors that affect disease development. For example, various signaling pathways in tomato plants affect their susceptibility to AAL. Salicylic acid promotes resistance to AAL and antagonizes the ethylene response. Ethylene controls the synthesis of jasmonic acid, which is a necessary pathway for immunity. Independently of each other, salicylic acid, ethylene, and jasmonic acid can influence the susceptibility of tomato to AAL. Diagnosis of AAL is often from observing signs and symptoms from this fungal pathogen. In addition, a tomato cultivar's resistance to a toxin produced by AAL also affects disease development.

== Environment ==
In order to survive, Alternaria alternata needs a moist warm environment. It is often found in areas with humid climates, or where there has been significant rainfall. The fungus lives in seeds and seedlings, and is also spread by spores. This disease flourishes in dead plants that have been left in gardens over winter. Additionally, when dead infected debris is added to compost pile it can spread to other vegetables throughout the garden.

There are no insect vectors for this disease. This means that using insecticides has no effect on the spread of this pathogen. However, there are several cultural practices that can be followed to suppress this fungal pathogen's impact. The disease first occurs in the host's exposed leaves. Plants planted with rows in an east–west direction have more severe disease than do plants planted north–south. This implies that if one plants tomato plants in a north–south manner they will be less susceptible. It is also suggested to highly monitor plants in April through June. This is when the pathogen is most prevalent. If monitoring indicates the presence of AAL, it is suggested to begin late-spring treatments of fungicide about mid-April. However, if a garden has a history of disease, it is advised to take extra measures. This can be done by treating tomatoes in mid to late April and 2 to 3 weeks later by applying a fungicide. Because this is a fungal pathogen that thrives off of wet environments, overhead irrigation is never advised when irrigating. This causes the moisture to remain on the leaf tissue and increase susceptibility to the disease and provides an optimal environment for the fungus to survive and grow. Furrow irrigation or drip irrigation systems allow the plant to remain dry.

Overall, AAL thrives in moist warm environments. Cultural practices for preventing this disease include planting tomatoes in a row north to south, monitoring plants heavily April through June, and using a drip irrigation system to keep as much plant tissue dry and free of favorable environments for this pathogen.

While γ-aminobutyric acid (GABA) has no direct fungicidal activity on A. alternata, it does induce resistance in tomato (Solanum lycopersicum). Some or all of that resistance is by activation of the tomato's own enzymes exerting an antioxidant effect.

== Disease cycle ==
Teleomorph of Alternaria alternata is thought to be Clathrospora diplospora: this has yet to be confirmed. If this is correct, as a result this pathogen would be propagating itself via asexual spores called conidia. These conidia are produced in lesions on mature or dying leaves. Their production can begin in as few as ten days after the first symptoms appear, and can continue for to up to fifty days. A. alternata's conidia disperse via air currents, and their release from the lesions can be triggered by rainfall, or even just a sudden drop in humidity. When the conidium lands on a leaf, it will wait until the nighttime dew, and then germinate. It can either enter through the stomata, or penetrate directly through the top of the leaf, using its appressorium, infecting the leaf within 12 hours.

== Pathogenesis ==
At the cellular level, AAL produces toxins that are essential for pathogenicity on tomato. This host specific mycotoxin is called fumonisin B_{1}. It was identified and confirmed by research conducted on fast atom bombardment and ion spray mass spectrometry. Thus, tomatoes that are resistant to this pathogen may be resistance to this specific toxin. Resistance to the pathogen in tomato is inherited as a single gene expressing complete dominance. However, sensitivity to the fumonisin B_{1} gene is controlled by a single locus with two alleles expressing incomplete dominance when heterozygous. In addition to resistance to the specific gene, resistance can be found from signaling pathways.

At the organismal level, AAL grows very slowly. This makes it so its presence is often not known until seedlings become larger and are transplanted into the garden. A fungicide may be used to save the plants once they are infected; however, the disease cannot be completely eradicated.

Ultimately, pathogenicity of this organism depends on a specific tomato cultivar's resistance to an AAL strain's specific fumonisin B_{1} variant. Additionally, the best way to prevent this pathogen from producing disease on tomato plants is to ensure the tomatoes are resistant cultivars.

== Identification ==
=== Teleomorph ===
Thought to be Clathrospora diplospora (to be confirmed).

=== Anamorph ===
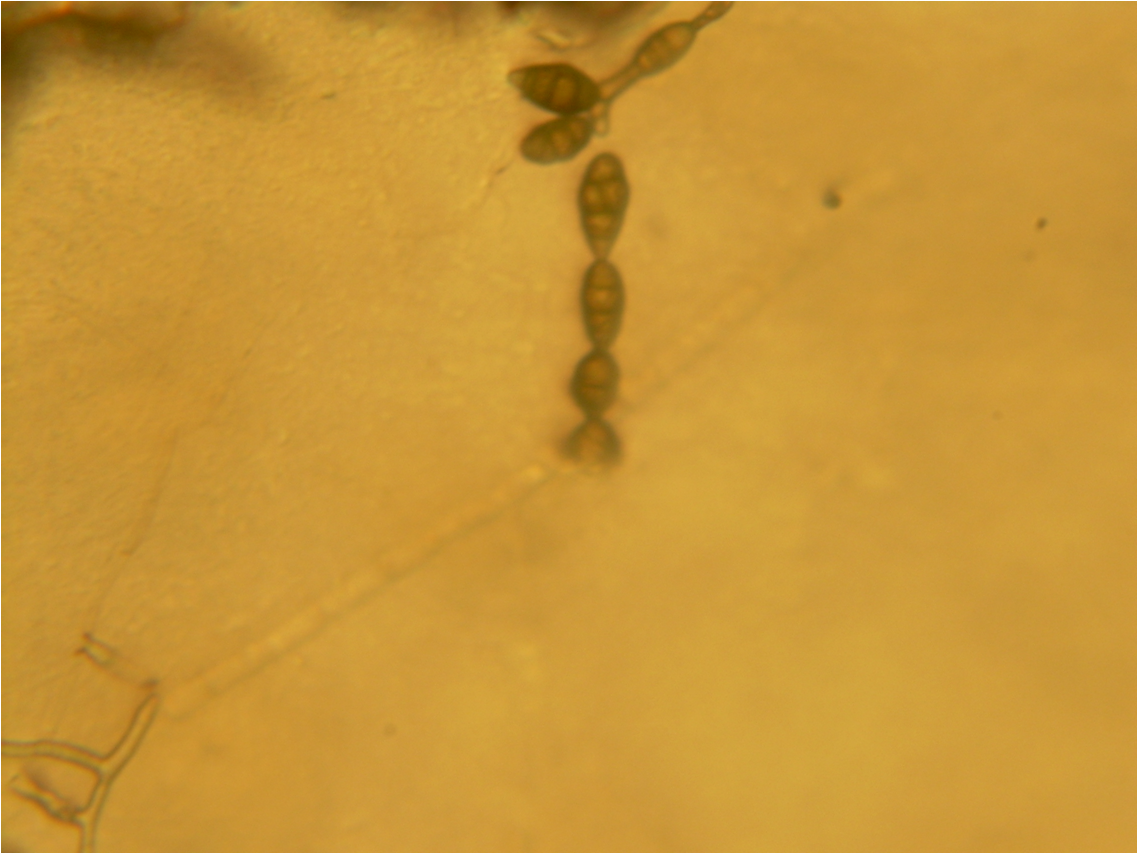
Spores in a chain

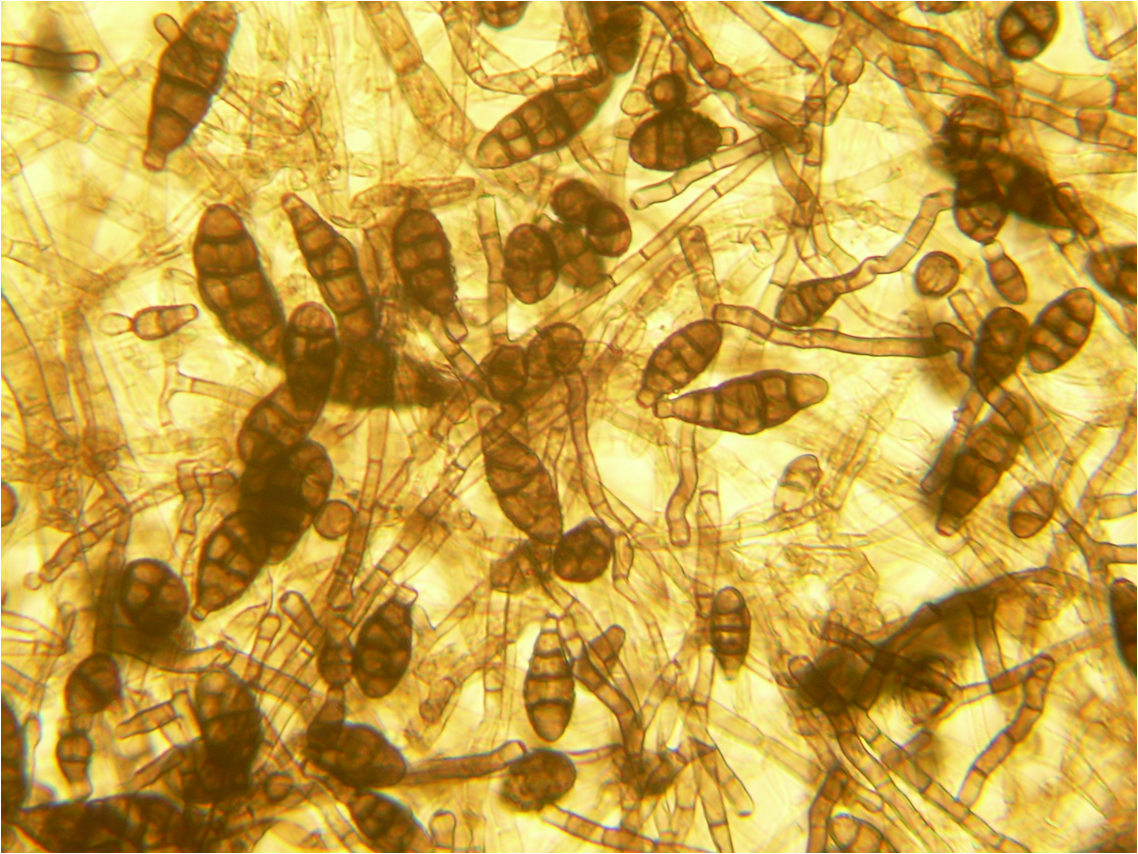
Spores

==== Conidiophore ====
- Pale brown to olive brown
- 25–60 x 3–3.5 μm
- Straight or flexuous
- Individual conidiophores arise directly from substrate forming bushy heads consisting of 4–8 large catenate conidia chains
- Secondary conidiophores are generally short and 1-celled

==== Conidia ====
- Pale brown to light brown
- Obclavate to obpyriform orellipsoid, short conical beak at the tip, or beakless
- Surface smooth to verruculose
- Size
  - 20–63 x 9–18 μm in size
  - (on PCA) mature conidia typically 10–30 x 5–12 μm
- Septa
  - Several vertical and −8 transverse septa
  - (on PCA) 3–7 transepta, 1–5 longisepta
- Chains
  - Produced in an often branched, long chain more than 5 conidia.
  - (on PCA) individual chains of 5–15 conidia, complex of branching chains may contain up to 50–60 conidia
