= Alternaria alternata f.sp. fragariae =

Scientific classification
- Kingdom: Fungi
- Division: Ascomycota
- Class: Dothideomycetes
- Order: Pleosporales
- Family: Pleosporaceae
- Genus: Alternaria
- Species: A. alternata
- Forma specialis: A. a. f.sp. fragariae

Trionomial name
- Alternaria alternata f.sp. fragariae Dingley (1970)

Fungal plant pathogen

Alternaria alternata f.sp. fragariae is a plant pathogen.
