= Idriella lunata =

Scientific classification
- Kingdom: Fungi
- Division: Ascomycota
- Class: Sordariomycetes
- Order: Xylariales
- Family: Microdochiaceae
- Genus: Idriella
- Species: I. lunata

Binomial name
- Idriella lunata P.E. Nelson & S. Wilh. (1956)

Species of fungus

Idriella lunata is a plant pathogen that causes root rot on strawberries and was first observed in California in 1956.
