= Pestalotia longisetula =

Scientific classification
- Kingdom: Fungi
- Division: Ascomycota
- Class: Sordariomycetes
- Order: Amphisphaeriales
- Family: Amphisphaeriaceae
- Genus: Pestalotia
- Species: P. longisetula

Binomial name
- Pestalotia longisetula Guba, (1961)

Synonyms
- Pestalotiopsis longisetula

Species of fungus

Pestalotia longisetula is a plant pathogen causing strawberry fruit rot.

== Hosts and symptoms ==
While P. longisetula is best known for infecting strawberry crops, it can also infect other plants, including apricots, peaches, guava, and tomato fruits. Some plants such as beans are immune to the disease. It takes on average about two weeks for mature plants to be fully infected, while plants at an earlier stage of growth spread infection more slowly. Infected areas become covered with white mycelia growth and the host plant starts to rot from the skin to the core of the plant. The plant as a whole suffers as the leaves develop lesions with spores to spread the disease.

== Infection ==
P. longisetula infects other plants through the leaves. Spores grow on the leaves and spread through the wind. The disease thrives in areas with high humidity and high wind. Once the plant has been infected, the disease spreads throughout the leaves and then attacks the fruit, causing it to rot on the skin and then the core. After eight days, most mature plants will be completely infected and a new phase of the infection begins, which spreads to the next plant. The host plant dies in most circumstances. Using pesticides and growing strawberries in areas with low wind power and low humidity can slow the progression of the infection.

== Importance ==
Countries depend on growing strawberries as profits. If the disease manifests in the area then by the time farmers locate it, a percentage of the plants are wiped out and profits are lost. Countries most affected are those that do not have access to pesticides or greenhouses to protect the plants.
