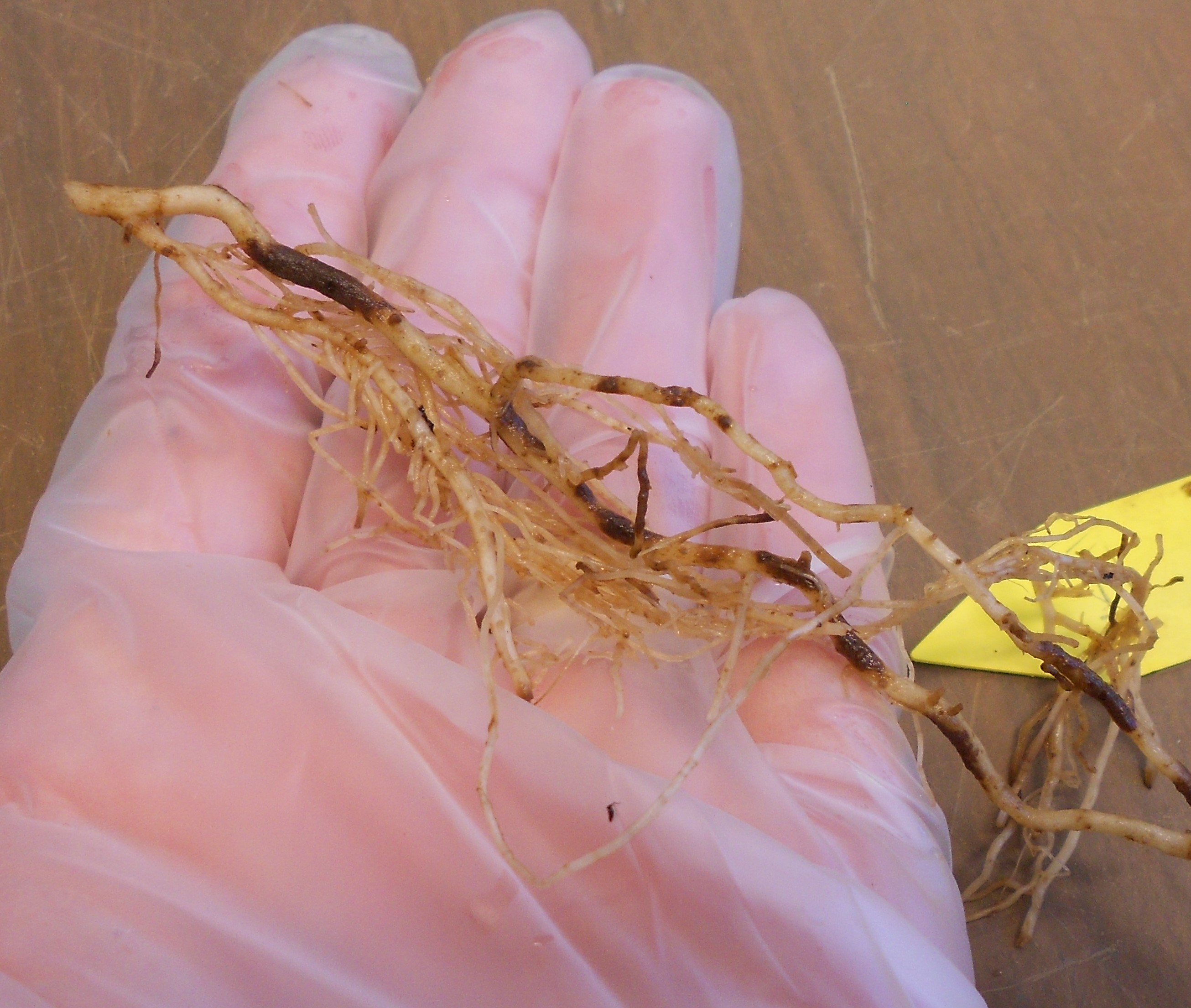
- Tomato roots showing symptoms of corky root rot caused by Pyrenochaeta lycopersici

Scientific classification
- Kingdom: Fungi
- Division: Ascomycota
- Class: Dothideomycetes
- Order: Pleosporales
- Family: incertae sedis
- Genus: Pyrenochaeta

Species
- Pyrenochaeta abutilonis; Pyrenochaeta acaciae; Pyrenochaeta achyranthis; Pyrenochaeta acicola; Pyrenochaeta aesculi; Pyrenochaeta amaranthi; Pyrenochaeta anthyllidis; Pyrenochaeta apiicola; Pyrenochaeta argentinensis; Pyrenochaeta aristolochiae; Pyrenochaeta asarina; Pyrenochaeta aurantii; Pyrenochaeta berberidis; Pyrenochaeta berberidis; Pyrenochaeta bergevinii; Pyrenochaeta brachylasia; Pyrenochaeta briardii; Pyrenochaeta cajani; Pyrenochaeta calligoni; Pyrenochaeta capparicola; Pyrenochaeta capparidicola; Pyrenochaeta caraganae; Pyrenochaeta caucasica; Pyrenochaeta cava; Pyrenochaeta centaureae; Pyrenochaeta centaureae; Pyrenochaeta cerastii; Pyrenochaeta cereicola; Pyrenochaeta cesatiana; Pyrenochaeta chaetomioides; Pyrenochaeta clithridis; Pyrenochaeta collabens; Pyrenochaeta collematis; Pyrenochaeta complanata; Pyrenochaeta congensis; Pyrenochaeta convolvuli; Pyrenochaeta corni; Pyrenochaeta crotalariae; Pyrenochaeta dalbergiae; Pyrenochaeta darjeelingensis; Pyrenochaeta decipiens; Pyrenochaeta desmodii; Pyrenochaeta destructiva; Pyrenochaeta dichondrae; Pyrenochaeta diedickeana; Pyrenochaeta dolichi; Pyrenochaeta elodeae; Pyrenochaeta elymi; Pyrenochaeta engleri; Pyrenochaeta eremuri; Pyrenochaeta erysimi; Pyrenochaeta erysiphoides; Pyrenochaeta erythrinae; Pyrenochaeta exosporioides; Pyrenochaeta fallax; Pyrenochaeta ferox; Pyrenochaeta ferulae; Pyrenochaeta filarskyi; Pyrenochaeta filarszkyi; Pyrenochaeta fraxinina; Pyrenochaeta furfuracea; Pyrenochaeta gardeniae; Pyrenochaeta geasteris; Pyrenochaeta gentianae; Pyrenochaeta gentianicola; Pyrenochaeta globosa; Pyrenochaeta glycines; Pyrenochaeta graminis; Pyrenochaeta grewiae; Pyrenochaeta gymnocladi; Pyrenochaeta hakeae; Pyrenochaeta halleriana; Pyrenochaeta helicina; Pyrenochaeta heliettae; Pyrenochaeta hepaticarum; Pyrenochaeta hirta; Pyrenochaeta hispidula; Pyrenochaeta humicola; Pyrenochaeta ilicis; Pyrenochaeta indica; Pyrenochaeta inflorescentiae; Pyrenochaeta ingrata; Pyrenochaeta ingrati; Pyrenochaeta jaapii; Pyrenochaeta jaczewskii; Pyrenochaeta keratinophila; Pyrenochaeta kuwatsukai; Pyrenochaeta kuznetzoviana; Pyrenochaeta leptospora; Pyrenochaeta leptospora; Pyrenochaeta ligni-putridi; Pyrenochaeta lignicola; Pyrenochaeta lupini; Pyrenochaeta luzulae; Pyrenochaeta lycopersici; Pyrenochaeta mackinnonii; Pyrenochaeta magna; Pyrenochaeta magnusioides; Pyrenochaeta mali; Pyrenochaeta microsperma; Pyrenochaeta minuta; Pyrenochaeta mitteriellae; Pyrenochaeta myrtacearum; Pyrenochaeta nipponica; Pyrenochaeta nobilis; Pyrenochaeta nucinata; Pyrenochaeta oligotricha; Pyrenochaeta orchidophila; Pyrenochaeta origani; Pyrenochaeta oryzae; Pyrenochaeta oxalidis; Pyrenochaeta pampeana; Pyrenochaeta papyricola; Pyrenochaeta parasitica; Pyrenochaeta penniseti; Pyrenochaeta phlogis; Pyrenochaeta phloxidis; Pyrenochaeta pinicola; Pyrenochaeta protearum; Pyrenochaeta pubescens; Pyrenochaeta putaminis; Pyrenochaeta quercina; Pyrenochaeta radicina; Pyrenochaeta radulescui; Pyrenochaeta resedae; Pyrenochaeta rhenana; Pyrenochaeta rivini; Pyrenochaeta robiniae; Pyrenochaeta robiniana; Pyrenochaeta romeroi; Pyrenochaeta rosella; Pyrenochaeta rubi-idaei; Pyrenochaeta rubtzovii; Pyrenochaeta saccardiana; Pyrenochaeta saccardoana; Pyrenochaeta sacchari; Pyrenochaeta saccharina; Pyrenochaeta salviae; Pyrenochaeta sancheziae; Pyrenochaeta seminicola; Pyrenochaeta setariae; Pyrenochaeta sparsibarba; Pyrenochaeta spegazziniana; Pyrenochaeta spinaciae; Pyrenochaeta spinicola; Pyrenochaeta stanhopeae; Pyrenochaeta subgen. Pyrenochaeta; Pyrenochaeta subgen. Trichocicinnus; Pyrenochaeta tanaceti; Pyrenochaeta tandonii; Pyrenochaeta tarda; Pyrenochaeta telephii; Pyrenochaeta telephoni; Pyrenochaeta terrestris; Pyrenochaeta thalini; Pyrenochaeta unguis-hominis; Pyrenochaeta urenae; Pyrenochaeta vanillae; Pyrenochaeta vexans; Pyrenochaeta vinosa; Pyrenochaeta violae; Pyrenochaeta vitis; Pyrenochaeta xanthoriae; Pyrenochaeta ziziphina; Pyrenochaeta zizyphina

= Pyrenochaeta =

Genus of fungi

Pyrenochaeta is a genus of fungus.

It includes the species Pyrenochaeta romeroi. Can cause a disease called eumycetoma.

Other species include:

- Pyrenochaeta lycopersici
- Pyrenochaeta terrestris
