= Fluopicolide =

Names
- Preferred IUPAC name 2,6-Dichloro-N-{[3-chloro-5-(trifluoromethyl)pyridin-2-yl]methyl}benzamide

Identifiers
CAS Number	239110-15-7
3D model (JSmol)	Interactive image
ChEBI	CHEBI:81764
ChemSpider	9334122
ECHA InfoCard	100.110.208
PubChem CID	11159021
UNII	6TRO75M67P
CompTox Dashboard (EPA)	DTXSID7034624
- InChI: InChI=1S/C14H8Cl3F3N2O/c15-8-2-1-3-9(16)12(8)13(23)22-6-11-10(17)4-7(5-21-11)14(18,19)20/h1-5H,6H2,(H,22,23) Key: GBOYJIHYACSLGN-UHFFFAOYSA-N; InChI=1/C14H8Cl3F3N2O/c15-8-2-1-3-9(16)12(8)13(23)22-6-11-10(17)4-7(5-21-11)14(18,19)20/h1-5H,6H2,(H,22,23) Key: GBOYJIHYACSLGN-UHFFFAOYAE
- SMILES: C1=CC(=C(C(=C1)Cl)C(=O)NCC2=C(C=C(C=N2)C(F)(F)F)Cl)Cl

Properties
Chemical formula	C_{14}H_{8}Cl_{3}F_{3}N_{2}O
Molar mass	383.58 g·mol^{−1}
- Except where otherwise noted, data are given for materials in their standard state (at 25 °C [77 °F], 100 kPa). Infobox references

Fluopicolide is a fungicide used in agriculture to control diseases caused by oomycetes such as late blight of potato. It is classed as an acylpicolide and its chemical name is 2,6-dichloro-N-{[3-chloro-5-(trifluoromethyl)pyridin-2-yl]methyl}benzamide. The precise mode of action is not known, but it is thought to act by affecting spectrin-like proteins in the cytoskeleton of oomycetes. This mode of action differs from other available fungicides used to control oomycetes and it can inhibit the growth of strains that are resistant to phenylamides, strobilurin, dimethomorph and iprovalicarb. It has some systemic activity as it moves through the xylem towards the tips of stems, but does not get transported to the roots. It affects the motility of zoospores, the germination of cysts, the growth of the mycelium and sporulation. Bayer CropScience developed the compound and it was first released as a commercial product in 2006.

== Uses ==
Fluopicolide has been shown to be effective at controlling Phytophthora infestans, Phytophthora capsicii, Phytophthora porri, Plasmopara viticola, Perenospora parasitica, Peronospora tabacina, Peronospora sparsa, Pseudoperonospora cubensis and Bremia lactucae. As of 2007, it was only available commercially as a co-formulation with Fosetyl-Al for use in vines (as Profiler) and as a co-formulation with propamocarb for use on potatoes and vegetables (as Infinito). Other products were in development.

== Toxicity ==
The median lethal dose in rats is >5000 mg/kg meaning that fluopicolide has low acute toxicity. Tests in other mammals indicate that it does not cause skin sensitisation, cancer or developmental problems.
