= Black rot on orchids =

Fungal plant disease

Black rot on orchids is caused by Pythium and Phytophthora species. Black rot targets a variety of orchids but Cattleya orchids are especially susceptible. Pythium ultimum and Phytophthora cactorum are known to cause black rot in orchids.

Pythium ultimum is a pathogen that causes damping-off and root rot on plants. Symptoms of this pathogen include stunting and chlorosis. Identifying Pythium ultimum has traditionally been done by examining oogonia, antheridia, and sporangium structure. Now, PCR (polymerase chain reaction) technology can identify the pathogen using DNA fragments.

Phytophthora cactorum is a pathogen that causes root rot on many plant species. Symptoms of this pathogen include necrosis in the roots, chlorosis, and wilting. Phytophthora cactorum can be identified by examining oogonia, antheridium, oospore, and sporangia structure.

== Disease cycle ==
Pythium ultimum

P. ultimum requires moist conditions to germinate. When conditions are favorable, surviving oospores in the soil produce a sporangia and zoospores which facilitate infection via germ tube. From there, mycelium will grow throughout all plant tissues. The disease is primarily a root rot that causes symptoms of foliar blight. Sporangia are produced on the mycelium and can produce zoospores for asexual reproduction or an oogonium and antheridium for sexual reproduction. Once the oogonium is fertilized, the oospore either infects via germ tube or produces sporangia and zoospores.

Phytophthora cactorum

P. cactorum requires free water to reproduce. Zoospores are released from sporangium and blown via wind or rain splash and use free water on the leaf to germinate. An appressorium is formed and a penetration peg penetrates the leaf surface. From there, hyphae grow throughout the leaf and infects all plant tissues. While this pathogen enters through the leaf, the disease is caused by root rot that causes symptoms of foliar blight. The mycelium gives rise to chlamydospores and oospores. Oospores produce mycelium that produce sporangia. Oospores are the survival structure of P. cactorum. Chlamydospores produce mycelium that continues to infect the plant.

== Environmental conditions ==
Pythium ultimum

Pythium species rely on moist soils and cool conditions. Moist conditions allow the movement of zoospores which infect the plant. From here, the fungus penetrates the leaf surface and mycelial growth takes over the plant.

Phytophthora cactorum

Phytophthora species thrive in moist soils. When there is free water in the soil, conditions are met for sporangia to be produced. As the disease cycle mentioned, sporangia produce zoospores which are infectious. Spring and autumn also produce temperatures that are most favorable for zoospore production.

== Control and management ==
Avoiding black rot in orchids is challenging. Avoiding symptomatic plants and isolating new plants from larger populations is helpful. In addition, decontaminating pots, tools, and work surfaces ensures that there are no contamination that could infect healthy plants. Potting media should also be sterilized as spores and hyphae can survive in dust or free water. Being careful not to over water, providing good drainage, air circulation, and proper potting media are helpful to prevent zoospores from having an optimal environment to move and infect. Fungicides are also used. The primary fungicide treatments to control black rot are metalaxyl, fosetyl-AI, and etridiazole that are sprayed onto the plant. Poultices such as copper sulfate and lime or cinnamon can also be useful fungicides.
