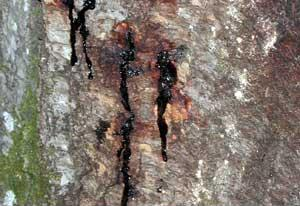
- Canker on an infected oak

Scientific classification
- Domain: Eukaryota
- Clade: Sar
- Clade: Stramenopiles
- Division: Oomycota
- Class: Peronosporomycetes
- Order: Peronosporales
- Family: Peronosporaceae
- Genus: Phytophthora
- Species: P. ramorum

Binomial name
- Phytophthora ramorum Werres et al. 2001

= Phytophthora ramorum =

Species of single-celled organism

Phytophthora ramorum is the oomycete known to cause the disease sudden oak death (SOD). The disease kills oak and other species of trees and has had devastating effects on the oak populations in California and Oregon, as well as being present in Europe. Symptoms include bleeding cankers on the tree's trunk and dieback of the foliage, in many cases leading to the death of the tree.

P. ramorum also infects a great number of other plant species, significantly woody ornamentals such as Rhododendron, Viburnum, and Pieris, causing foliar symptoms known as ramorum dieback or ramorum blight. Such plants can act as a source of inoculum for new infections, with the pathogen producing spores that can be transmitted by rainsplash and rainwater.

P. ramorum was first reported in 1995, and the origins of the pathogen are still unclear, but most evidence suggests it was introduced as an exotic species to Europe and North America in separate events. Very few control mechanisms exist for the disease, and they rely upon early detection and proper disposal of infected plant material.

== Presence ==
The disease is known to exist in California's coastal region between Big Sur (in Monterey County) and Del Norte County. It is confirmed to exist in all coastal counties in this range, as well as in all immediately inland counties from Santa Clara County north to Trinity County. It has not been found east of the California Coast Ranges, however. It was reported in Curry County, Oregon, just north of the California stateline, in 2001. Sonoma County has been hit hardest, having more than twice the area of new mortality of any other county in California.

About the same time, a similar disease in continental Europe and the UK was also identified as Phytophthora ramorum.

== Hosts and symptoms ==
=== In North America ===
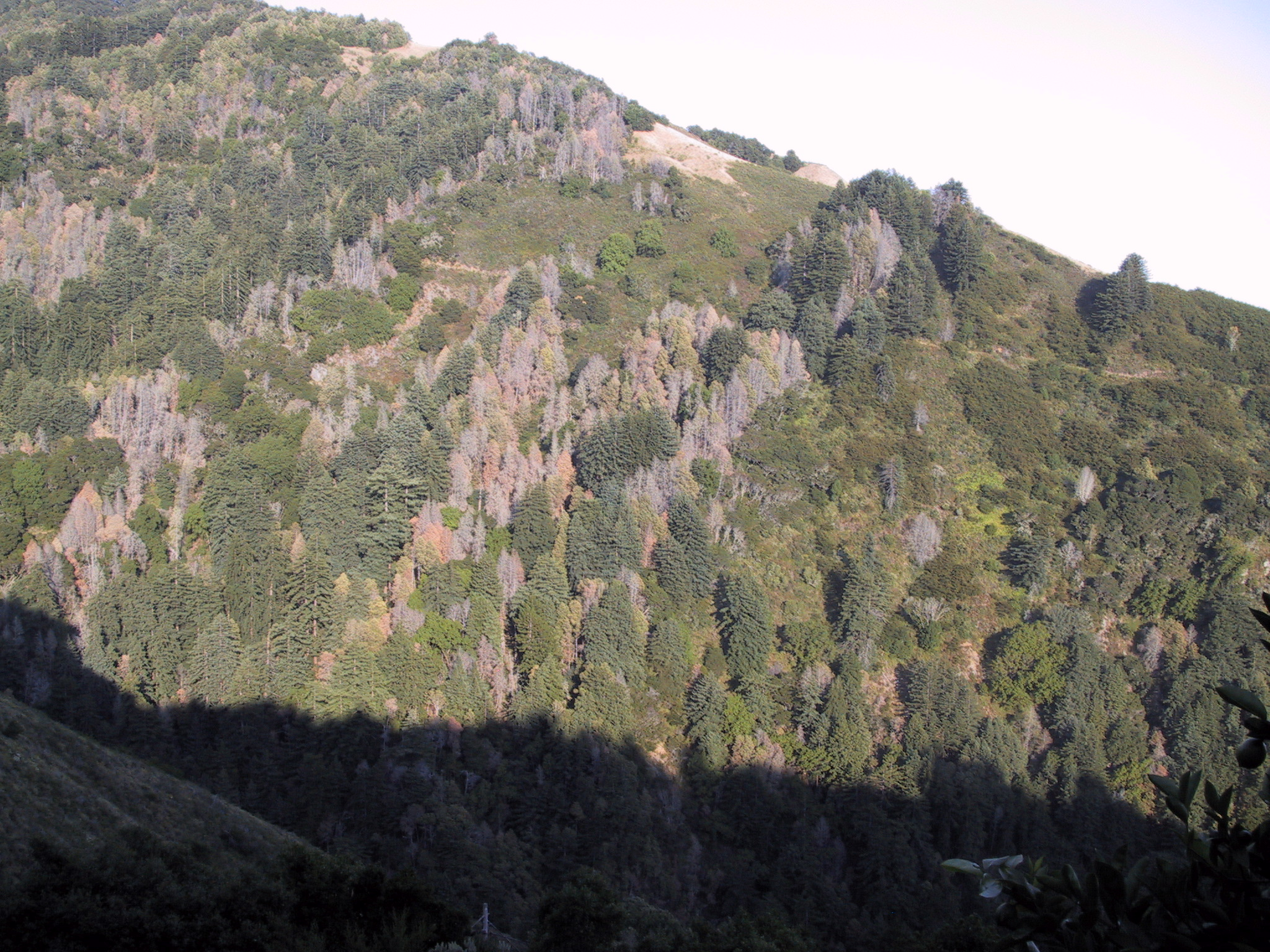
A hillside in Big Sur, California, devastated by sudden oak death

It was first discovered in California in 1995 when large numbers of tanoaks (Notholithocarpus densiflorus) died mysteriously, and was described as a new species of Phytophthora in 2000. It has subsequently been found in many other areas, including some other U.S. states, Britain, and Germany, either accidentally introduced in nursery stock as a pathogen belonging to ornamental rhododendron, or already present undetected.

In tanoaks, the disease is recognized by wilting new shoots, older leaves becoming pale green, and after a period of two to three weeks, foliage turning brown while clinging to the branches. Dark brown sap stains the lower trunk's bark. Bark often splits and exudes gum, with visible discoloration. After the tree dies back, suckers try to sprout the next year, but their tips soon bend and die. Ambrosia beetles (Monarthrum scutellare) will most likely infest a dying tree during midsummer, producing piles of fine white dust near tiny holes. Later, bark beetles (Pseudopityophthorus pubipennis) produce fine, red boring dust. Small black domes, the fruiting bodies of the Hypoxylon fungus, often are present on the bark. Leaf death occurs more than a year after the initial infection and months after the tree has been girdled by beetles.

In coast live oaks and Californian black oaks, the first symptom is a burgundy-red to tar-black thick sap bleeding from the bark surface. These are often referred to as bleeding cankers.

In addition to oaks, many other forest species may be hosts for the disease; in fact, it was observed in the United States that nearly all woody plants in some Californian forests were susceptible to P. ramorum. Vulnerable species include rhododendron, madrone (Arbutus menziesii), evergreen huckleberry (Vaccinium ovatum), California bay laurel (Umbellularia californica), buckeye (Aesculus californica), bigleaf maple (Acer macrophyllum), toyon (Heteromeles arbutifolia), manzanita (Arctostaphylos spp.), coast redwood (Sequoia sempervirens), Douglas fir (Pseudotsuga menziesii), coffeeberry (Rhamnus californica), honeysuckle (Lonicera hispidula), and Shreve oak (Quercus parvula). P. ramorum more commonly causes a less severe disease known as ramorum dieback/leaf blight on these hosts. Characteristic symptoms are dark spots on foliage and in some hosts the dieback of the stems and twigs. The disease is capable of killing some hosts, such as rhododendron, but most survive. Disease progression on these species is not well documented. Redwoods symptoms show purple lesions on sprouts and needle discoloration and cankers on small branches, which can lead to sprout mortality.

The primary symptom of P. ramorum on Rhododendron are leaf spots that expand into lesions. The lesions pierce through the plant tissue so that the spots are the same on both the top and bottom of the leaf. The lesions are usually triangular in shape and extend along the midvein. They can appear anywhere water collects on the surface of the leaf. Leaf spots have diffused margins and can appear water soaked. In severe cases, the entire host plant can die.

=== In Europe ===
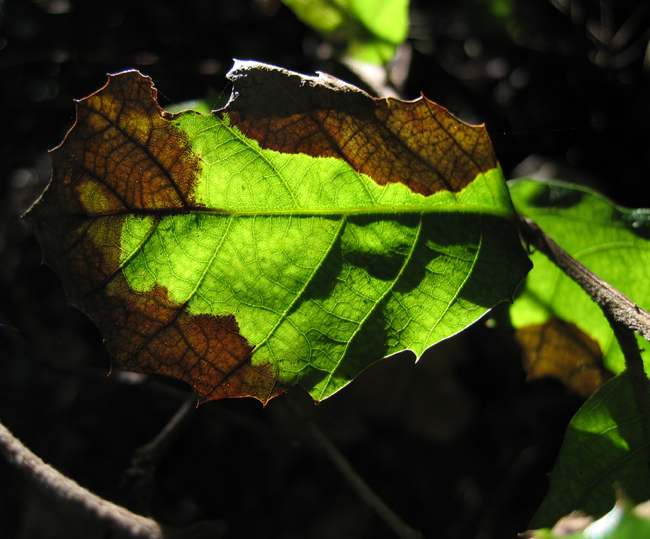
Leaf death caused by P. ramorum

In Europe, ramorum blight was first observed on Rhododendron and Viburnum in the early 1990s, where it was initially found mainly on container-grown plants in nurseries. The principal symptoms were leaf and twig blight. By 2007, it had spread throughout nurseries and retail centers in 16 European countries, and had been detected in gardens, parks, and woodlands in at least eight countries. It has not caused significant harm to European oak species.

In 2009, the pathogen was found to be infecting and killing large numbers of Japanese larch trees (Larix kaempferi) in the United Kingdom at sites in the English counties of Somerset, Devon, and Cornwall. It was the first time in the world that Phytophthora ramorum had been found infecting this species. Since then, it has also been found extensively in larch plantations in Wales and in southwest Scotland, which led to harvesting of larch on hundreds of acres/hectares. The UK Forestry Commission noted that eradication of the disease would not be possible, and instead adopted a strategy of containing the disease to reduce its spread. Symptoms of the disease on larch trees include dieback of the tree's crown and branches, and a distinctive yellowing or ginger colour beneath the bark. In August 2010, the disease was found in Japanese larch trees in counties Waterford and Tipperary in Ireland. It had spread to Japanese larch plantations across the south of the country by February 2014. Coillte, who owned twenty forests where the disease was present, felled 16,000 trees in one of its forests, having already felled 150 hectares to contain the disease. In 2023 the disease was found to be infecting larch trees at Wyming Brook, Sheffield, with plans to fell over 1,000 trees to contain the spread of the infection.

The closely related Phytophthora kernoviae causes similar symptoms to P. ramorum, but infects the European beech (Fagus sylvatica).

=== Disease cycle ===
The primary inoculum (sporangia) of P. ramorum. develop on the leaves of the primary host, which include tree species like the California bay laurel, a large hardwood tree that grows on the pacific west coast. These spores are then carried by rain and air currents to the leaves of the new bole canker host, which include broadleaf trees like tanoaks, where they begin to develop. The secondary inoculum infects the inner bark and sapwood, resulting in bleeding cankers on the bark of the new host, which are exacerbated by infected fallen leaves and rain splashing the understory of the canker host which can both serve as sources of inoculum. After the plant matter it infects dies and decomposes, P. ramorum is transferred to the soil by rainwater, where the final part of its cycle (soil phase) is poorly understood by scientists. However, it is suspected that chlamydospores play a role in the long-term survival of the pathogen, yet the triggers for germination are not known. Additionally, the spores of P. ramorum only seem to propagate successfully in a temperature range between 65 and 70 °F (18 and 21 °C), which is useful to know for protecting nurseries and identifying potential transfer windows for the disease.

== Transmission ==
P. ramorum produces both resting spores (chlamydospores) and zoospores, which have flagella enabling swimming. P. ramorum is spread by air; one of the major mechanisms of dispersal is rainwater splashing spores onto other susceptible plants, and into watercourses to be carried for greater distances. Chlamydospores can withstand harsh conditions and are able to overwinter. The pathogen will take advantage of wounding, but it is not necessary for infection to occur.

As mentioned above, P. ramorum does not kill every plant that can be used as a host, and these plants are most important in the epidemiology of the disease as they act as sources of inoculum. In California, California bay laurel (Umbellularia californica) seems to be the main source of inoculum. Green waste, such as leaf litter and tree stumps, are also capable of supporting P. ramorum as a saprotroph and acting as a source of inoculum. Because P. ramorum is able to infect many ornamental plants, it can be transmitted by ornamental plant movement.

In nursery settings, P. ramorum is dispersed mostly between adjacent, touching plants and exposure to infested surface water. Long-distance dispersal is enabled by shipments of infected nursery plants, which is likely the cause for introduction into Europe and North America.

Hikers, mountain bikers, horseback riders, and other people engaged in various outdoor activities may also unwittingly move the pathogen into areas where it was not previously present. Those travelling in an area known to be infested with SOD can help prevent the spread of the disease by cleaning their (and their animals') feet, tires, tools, camping equipment, etc. before returning home or entering another uninfected area, especially if they have been in muddy soil. Additionally, the movement of firewood could introduce sudden oak death to otherwise uninfected areas. Both homeowners and travelers are advised to buy and burn local firewood.

Transmission of P. ramorum may also occur through movement of propagules on the exterior of some animals, such as migratory birds, snails, and slugs.

== The two mating types ==
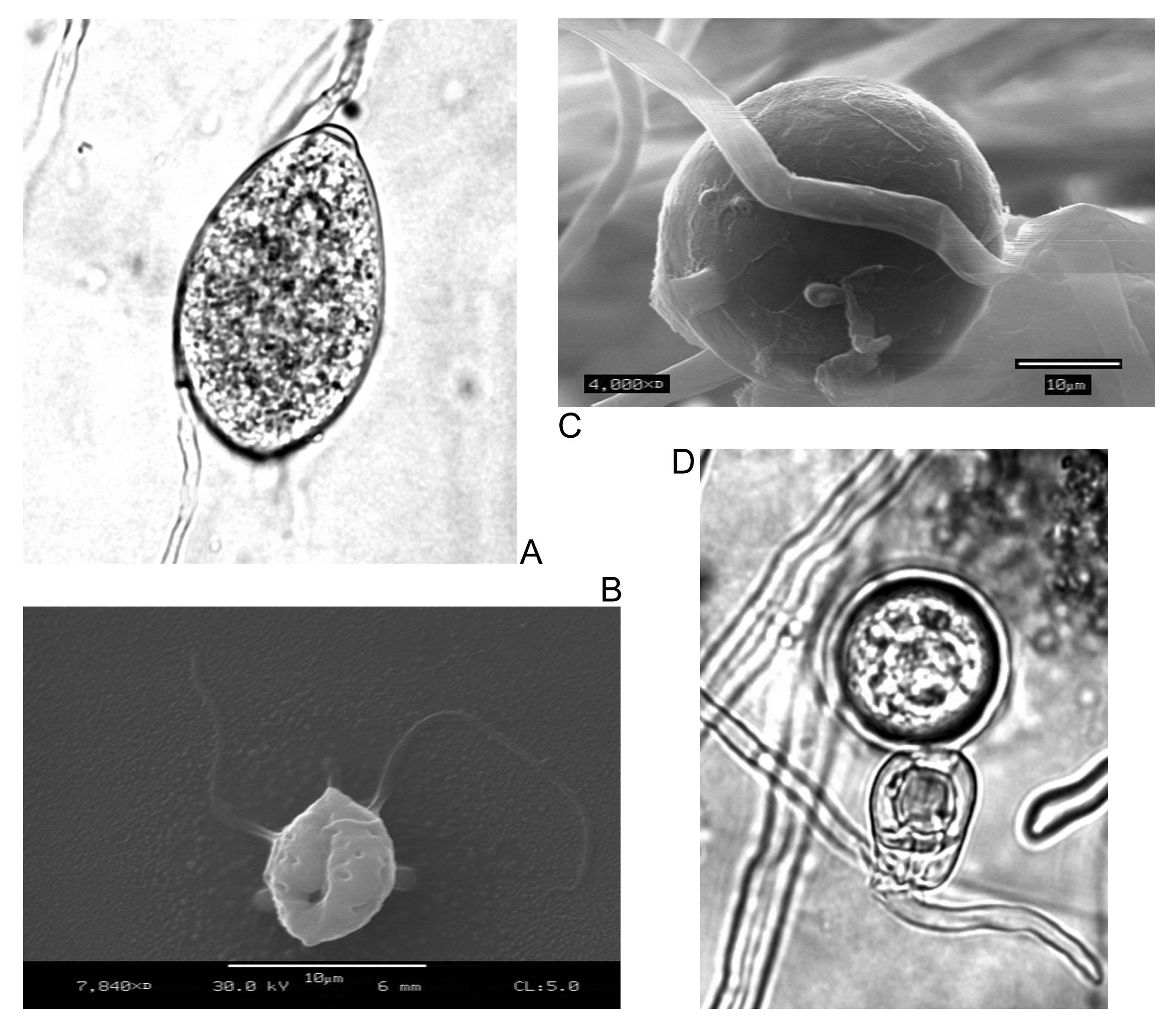
Mating structures

P. ramorum is heterothallic and has two mating types, A1 and A2, required for sexual reproduction. The European population is predominantly A1 while both mating types A1 and A2 are found in North America. Genetics of the two isolates indicate that they are reproductively isolated. On average, the A1 mating type is more virulent than the A2 mating type, but more variation occurs in the pathogenicity of A2 isolates. It is currently not clear whether this pathogen can reproduce sexually in nature and genetic work has suggested that the lineages of the two mating types might be isolated reproductively or geographically given the evolutionary divergence observed. One study conducted in 2010 investigated the sexual reproduction capacity of this pathogen by pairing between the EU1 A1 type and both European and American A2 types. Plugs of tomato juice agarose containing actively growing P. ramorum cultures of different types on carrot agar and incubated in the dark at 20 Celsius. Resultant oospores were isolated, cleaned, and stained with tetrazolium dye in the MTT assay. Purple oospores were counted as dormant whereas clear, blue, or black were considered non-viable. Some of the purple spores had abnormal morphologies, however. Normal morphology includes a nucleus, a double wall, and an ooplast. After a 60-day maturation period, no germination of the dormant oospores was observed. After a 110-day incubation period, >0.5% of oospores germinated. Longer germination times only marginally increased germination rate. Progeny obtained from the oospores were diverse, with some being homothallic and others being of either A1 or A2 types. Pathogenicity of progeny was likewise variable. Since the discovery of the origin of this pathogen in East Asian laurel forests near Yunnan province and in southwestern Japan, more types of this pathogen have been characterized, such as Indochinese (IC) and Japanese (NP) phenotypes based on colony morphology on agar. However, it appears that there are still only two viable mating types, A1 and A2, with one isolate from the Indochinese group failing to respond to any attempts at inducing mating, leading it to be characterized as "A0", a non-responder. A1 and A2 types were isolated from both Japan and the Yunnan/Vietnam border. Resultant gametangia were sparse. Mean oospore diameter was 26.1 micrometers. Of those oospores that were created, 81.5% of IC1 and IC2 offspring had normal morphology. 18.5% were obviously aborted. For NP1xNP2 gametangia were too sparse to determine abortion rates, but it was very high. Overall, it seems that P. ramorum is capable of sexual reproduction but it is very inefficient, even among the source population.

== Possible origins ==
P. ramorum is a relatively new disease, and several debates have occurred about where it may have originated or how it evolved. One of the major reasons that identifying the natural range of this organism is difficult is that it typically will not cause symptomatic or infectious disease in hosts that are adapted to live in concert with it naturally. It is only when this organism leaks into vulnerable habitat with less resistant host species that a notable amount of destruction occurs.

In 2021, research came out revealing that the origins of this pathogen are subtropical laurisilva forests in East Asia, specifically the area near the border of Vietnam and Yunnan, China, as well as southwestern Japan. 505 Phytophthora cultures were obtained from leaves in Fansipan and Sau Chua mountain streams; of these, 64 samples from 7 streams (6 from Fansipan and 1 from Sau Chua) were identified as P. ramorum. On the Japanese islands of Shikoku and Kyushu, 17 stream catchments were sampled, giving 597 Phytophthora cultures; of these, 3 from Shikoku and 4 from Kyushu were identified as P. ramorum. In addition to the EU and NA types, researchers identified by colony morphology on carrot agar two new phenotype groups: Indochinese and Japanese. In a high temperature/low water stress test, NA2 and EU2 were highly tolerant, and NA1 and EU1 had no growth. Indochinese (IC) and Japanese (NP) phenotype colonies had highly variable responses, indicating multiple genotypes within each phenotypic grouping. In a mating test, it was discovered that 89% of isolates were of the A1 mating type; only 11% were of type A2. A pairing of two Indochinese types IC1 and IC2 resulted in formation of oospores similar to that observed between known lineages of different type. Lineage IC1 is thought to have given rise to the EU1 group. NP1 is ancestral to NP2 and sister to EU2. NA2 is ancestral to NA1. The level of diversity in the East Asian samples compared to the diversity in the four lineages known previously supports the hypothesis that this is the geographic center of origin of Phytophthora ramorum. Furthermore, no symptomatic vegetation was observed. The presence of other Phytophthora spp. including P. foliorum and P. lateralis in southwestern Japan suggests that this might be the origin of a clade of related species labelled as clade 8c.

=== Introduction as an exotic species ===
P. ramorum is an introduced species, and these introductions occurred separately for the European and North American populations, hence why only one mating type exists on each continent – this is called a founder effect. The differences between the two populations are thus caused by adaptation to separate climates. Evidence includes little genetic variability, as P. ramorum has not had time to diversify since being introduced. Existing variability may be explained by multiple introductions with a few individuals adapting best to their respective environments. The behavior of the pathogen in California is also indicative of being introduced; it is assumed that such a high mortality rate of trees would have been noticed sooner if P. ramorum were native.

=== Hybridization events ===
Species of Phytophthora have been shown to have evolved by the interspecific hybridization of two different species from the genus. When a species is introduced into a new environment, it causes episodic selection. The invading species is exposed to other resident taxa, and hybridization may occur to produce a new species. If these hybrids are successful, they may outcompete their parent species. Thus, P. ramorum is possibly a hybrid between two species. Nevertheless, the draft genome of P. ramorum did not show any evidence of recent hybridization.

== Ecological impacts ==
In relation to human ecology, the loss of tanoak as the pathogen spreads to culturally sensitive Native American lands represents a loss of tanoak acorns as one of the most important traditional and ceremonial foods still used in Northern California such as among Yurok people, Hupa, Miwok, and Karuk peoples. Similar impact applies to the decline of other native plant species that are traditional food sources in tanoak and oak regimens infected by the pathogen.

In forest ecology, the pathogen contributes to loss of environmental services provided by diversity of plant species and interdependent wildlife.

The mortality caused by this emerging disease is expected to cause many indirect effects. Several predictions of long-term impacts have been discussed in the scientific literature. While such predictions are necessarily speculative, indirect impacts occurring on shorter time scales have been documented in a few cases. For instance, one study demonstrated that redwood trees (Sequoia sempervirens) grew faster after neighboring tanoaks were killed by sudden oak death. Other studies have combined current observations and reconstruction/projection techniques to document short-term impacts while also inferring future conditions. One study used this approach to investigate the effects of SOD on the structural characteristics of redwood forests.

Additional long-term impacts of SOD may be inferred from regeneration patterns in areas that have experienced severe mortality. These patterns may indicate which tree species will replace tanoak in diseased areas. Such transitions will be of particular importance in forest types that were relatively poor in tree species diversity before the introduction of SOD, e.g., redwood forest. As of 2011, the only study to comprehensively examine regeneration in SOD-impacted redwood forests found no evidence that other broadleaf tree species are seeding in. Instead, redwood was colonizing most mortality gaps. However, they also found inadequate regeneration in some areas and concluded that regeneration is continuing. Since this study only considered one site in Marin County, California, these results may not apply to other forests. Other impacts to the local ecology include, among others, the residual effects of spraying heavy pesticides (Agrifos) to treat SOD symptoms, and the heavy mortality of the native pollinator community that occurs as a result. Bee hives situated in areas of heavy Agrifos spraying have incurred significant losses of population in direct correlation to the application of these chemicals. Counties such as Napa and Sonoma may be doing significant damage to their native pollinator populations by virtue of adopting broad-based prophylactic pesticide policies. Such damage to the pollinator populations may have tertiary negative effects on the entire local plant community, compounding the loss of biodiversity, and thus environmental value, attributable to SOD.

=== Environmental and economic impact ===
Besides the quick and significant loss of symbiotic host species, since sudden oak death is classified as a stem-girdling disease, which is proven to cause a massive reduction in mycorrhizae soil biomass, the amount of phosphorus and micronutrients that mycorrhizae are able to absorb is greatly reduced in soils occupied by trees with SOD. Another significant environmental impact of P. ramorum is its tendency to result in large deposits of dry, woody debris in areas prone to forest fires, making them even more difficult to contain. Indeed, hotspots of SOD are "unmanageable" for fire crews, and there is increasing evidence to suggest that SOD plays a large role in a forest's susceptibility to fire. On the other side of the spectrum are the significant economic impacts of P. ramorum, which are difficult to assess, but the most obvious of which is the reduction to property values of real estate containing oak trees, as oaks in particular tend to raise the property value of the plots they inhabit. Additionally, several U.S. industries have suffered due to the spread of SOD, including the ornamental plant, spice, and composting industries, especially in the state of California.

== Control ==
=== Early detection ===
Early detection of P. ramorum is essential for its control. On an individual-tree basis, preventive treatments, which are more effective than therapeutic treatments, depend on knowledge of the pathogen's movement through the landscape to know when it is nearing prized trees. On the landscape level, P. ramorum's fast and often undetectable movement means that any treatment hoping to slow its spread must happen very early in the development of an infestation. Since P. ramorum's discovery, researchers have been working on the development of early detection methods on scales ranging from diagnosis in individual infected plants to landscape-level detection efforts involving large numbers of people.

Detecting the presence of Phytophthora species requires laboratory confirmation. The traditional method of culturing is on a growth medium selective against fungi (and, in some cases, against other oomycetes such as Pythium species). Host material is removed from the leading edge of a plant tissue canker caused by the pathogen; resulting growth is examined under a microscope to confirm the unique morphology of P. ramorum. Successful isolation of the pathogen often depends on the type of host tissue and the time of year that detection is attempted.

Because of these difficulties, researchers have developed some other approaches for identifying P. ramorum. The enzyme-linked immunosorbent assay test can be the first step in nonculture methods of identifying P. ramorum, but it can only be a first step, because it detects the presence of proteins that are produced by all Phytophthora species. In other words, it can identify to the genus level, but not to the species level. ELISA tests can process large numbers of samples at once, so researchers often use it to screen out likely positive samples from those that are not when the total number of samples is very large. Some manufacturers produce small-scale ELISA "field kits" that the homeowner can use to determine if plant tissue is infected by Phytophthora.

Researchers have also developed numerous molecular techniques for P. ramorum identification. These include amplifying DNA sequences in the internal transcribed spacer region of the P. ramorum genome (ITS polymerase chain reaction, or ITS PCR); real-time PCR, in which DNA abundance is measured in real time during the PCR reaction, using dyes or probes such as SBYR-Green or TaqMan; multiplex PCR, which amplifies more than one region of DNA at the same time; and single strand conformation polymorphism (SSCP), which uses the ITS DNA sequence amplified by the PCR reaction to differentiate Phytophthora species according to their differential movement through a gel.

Additionally, researchers have begun using features of the DNA sequence of P. ramorum to pinpoint the minuscule differences of separate P. ramorum isolates from each other. Two techniques for doing this are amplified fragment length polymorphism, which through comparing differences between various fragments in the sequence has enabled researchers to differentiate correctly between EU and U.S. isolates, and the examination of microsatellites, which are areas on the sequence featuring repeating base pairs. When P. ramorum propagules arrive in a new geographic location and establish colonies, these microsatellites begin to display mutation in a relatively short time, and they mutate in a stepwise fashion. Based on this, researchers in California have been able to construct trees, based on microsatellite analyses of isolates collected from around the state, that trace the movement of P. ramorum from two likely initial points of establishment in Marin and Santa Cruz Counties and out to subsequent points.

Early detection of P. ramorum on a landscape scale begins with the observation of symptoms on individual plants (and/or detecting P. ramorum propagules in watercourses; see below). Systematic ground-based monitoring has been difficult within the range of P. ramorum because most infected trees stand on a complex mosaic of lands with various ownerships. In some areas, targeted ground-based surveys have been conducted in areas of heavy recreation or visitor use such as parks, trailheads, and boat ramps. In California, when conducting ground-based detection, looking for symptoms on bay laurel is the most effective strategy, since P. ramorum infection of true oaks and tanoaks is almost always highly associated with bay laurel, the main epidemiological springboard for the pathogen. Moreover, on many sites in California (though not all), P. ramorum can typically be detected from infected bay laurel tissues via culturing techniques year-round; this is not the case for most other hosts, nor is it the case in Oregon, where tanoak is the most reliable host.

As part of a nationwide USDA program, a ground-based detection survey was implemented from 2003 to 2006 in 39 U.S. states to determine whether the pathogen was established outside the West Coast areas already known to be infested. Sampling areas were stratified by environmental variables likely to be conducive to pathogen growth and by proximity to possible points of inoculum introduction such as nurseries. Samples were collected along transects established in potentially susceptible forests or outside the perimeters of nurseries. The only positive samples were collected in California, confirming that P. ramorum was not yet established in the environment outside the West Coast.

Aerial surveying has proven useful for detection of P. ramorum infestations across large landscapes, although it is not as "early" a technique as some others because it depends on spotting dead tanoak crowns from fixed-wing aircraft. Sophisticated GPS and sketch-mapping technology enable spotters to mark the locations of dead trees so that ground crews can return to the area to sample from nearby vegetation.

Detection of P. ramorum in watercourses has emerged as the earliest of early detection methods. This technique employs pear or rhododendron baits suspended in the watercourse using ropes, buckets, mesh bags, or other similar devices. If plants in the watershed are infected with P. ramorum, zoospores of the pathogen (as well as other Phytophthora spp.) are likely present in adjacent waterways. Under conducive weather conditions, the zoospores are attracted to the baits and infect them, causing lesions that can be isolated to culture the pathogen or analyzed via PCR assay. This method has detected P. ramorum at scales ranging from small, intermittent seasonal drainages to the Garcia, Chetco, and South Fork Eel Rivers in California and Oregon (144, 352, and 689 mi^{2} drainage areas, respectively). It can detect the existence of infected plants in watersheds before any mortality from the infections becomes evident. Of course, it cannot detect the exact locations of those infected plants: at the first sign of P. ramorum propagules in the stream, crews must scour the watershed using all available means to find symptomatic vegetation.

A less technical means of detecting P. ramorum at the landscape level involves engaging local landowners across the landscape in the search. Many local county agriculture departments and University of California Cooperative Extension offices in California have been able to keep track of the distribution of the pathogen in their regions through reports and samples brought to them by the public. In 2008, the Garbelotto Laboratory at University of California, Berkeley, along with local collaborators, hosted a series of educational events, called "SOD Blitzes", designed to give local landowners basic information about P. ramorum and how to identify its symptoms; each participant was provided with a sampling kit, sampled a certain number of trees on his or her property, and returned the samples to the lab for analysis. This kind of citizen science hopefully can help generate an improved map of P. ramorum distribution in the areas where the workshops are held.

=== Management in agriculture ===
Since U.S. regulators in 2004 discovered that P. ramorum had spread nationwide to a number of hosts, proactive inspections of agricultural shipments have been shown to help reduce the risk of infestations of sudden oak death. Moreover, the USDA's APHIS specifically plans to stop the spread of SOD by continuing their public outreach program and by passing regulations on the transfer of agricultural products that might be a disease vector for P. ramorum. Indeed, in Oregon and California, the USDA has successfully regulated the stock of potential host plants at nurseries to "starve" the disease of potential plant hosts. Furthermore, when managing it in nurseries, it is important to consider that nursery personnel are often required to visit sites in the field such as greenhouses, fields, and other nurseries. Therefore, a number of biosecurity measures must be taken to ensure that SOD is not unintentionally transferred to one's nursery, including driving vehicles only on paved, concrete, or gravel areas at inspection sites in order avoid contact with soil organic matter that could pose as a potential disease vector.

=== Wildland management ===
The course that P. ramorum management should take depends on a number of factors, including the scale of the landscape upon which one hopes to manage it. Management of P. ramorum has been undertaken at the landscape/ regional level in Oregon in the form of a campaign to completely eradicate the pathogen from the forests in which it has been found (mostly private, but also USDA Forest Service and USDI Bureau of Land Management ownership). The eradication campaign involves vigorous early detection by airplane and watercourse monitoring, a U.S. Department of Agriculture Animal and Plant Health Inspection Service (USDA APHIS) and Oregon Department of Agriculture-led quarantine to prevent movement of host materials out of the area where infected trees are found, and immediate removal of P. ramorum host vegetation, symptomatic or not, within a 300-foot (91 m) buffer around each infected tree.

The Oregon eradication effort, which began near the town of Brookings in southwest Oregon in 2001, has adapted its management efforts over the years in response to new information about P. ramorum. For example, after inoculation trials of various tree species more clearly delineated which hosts are susceptible, the Oregon cooperators began leaving nonhost species such as Douglas fir and red alder on site. In another example, after finding that a small percentage of tanoak stumps that were resprouting on the host removal sites were infected with the pathogen—whether these infections were systemic or reached the sprouts from the surrounding environment is unknown—the cooperators began pretreating trees with very small, targeted amounts of herbicide to kill the root systems of infected tanoaks before cutting them down. The effort has been successful in that while it has not yet completely eradicated the pathogen from Oregon forests, the epidemic in Oregon has not taken the explosive course that it has in California forests.

California, though, faces significant obstacles that preclude it from mounting the same kind of eradication effort. For one thing, the organism was too well established in forests in the Santa Cruz and San Francisco Bay areas by the time the cause of sudden oak death was discovered to enable any eradication effort to succeed. Even in still relatively uninfested areas of the north coast and southern Big Sur, regionally coordinated efforts to manage the pathogen face huge challenges of leadership, coordination, and funding. Nevertheless, land managers are still working to coordinate efforts between states, counties, and agencies to provide P. ramorum management in a more comprehensive manner.

Several options exist for landowners who want to limit the impacts of SOD death on their properties. None of these options is foolproof, guaranteed to eradicate P. ramorum, or guaranteed to prevent a tree from becoming infected. Some are still in the initial stage of testing. Nevertheless, when used thoughtfully and thoroughly, some of the treatments do improve the likelihood of either slowing the spread of the pathogen or of limiting its impacts on trees or stands of trees. Assuming that the landowner has correctly identified the host tree(s) and symptom(s), has submitted a sample to a local authority to send to an approved laboratory for testing, and has received confirmation that the tree(s) are indeed infected with P. ramorum—or, alternatively, assuming that the landowner knows that P. ramorum-infected trees are nearby and wants to protect the resources on his or her property—he or she can attempt control by cultural (individual-tree), chemical, or silvicultural (stand-level) means.

The best evidence that cultural techniques might help protect trees against P. ramorum comes from research that has established a correlation between disease risk in coast live oak trees and the trees' proximity to bay laurel. In particular, this research found that bay laurel trees growing within 5 m of the trunk of an oak tree were the best predictors of disease risk. This implies that strategic removal of bay laurel trees near coast live oaks might decrease the risk of oak infection. Wholesale removal of bay laurel trees would not be warranted, since the bay laurels close to the oak trees appear to provide the greatest risk factor. Whether the same pattern is true for other oaks or tanoaks has yet to be established. Research on this subject has been started for tanoak, but any eventual cultural recommendations will be more complicated, because tanoak twigs also serve as sources of P. ramorum inoculum.

An initially promising treatment for preventing infection of individual oak and tanoak trees—not for curing an already established infection—is a phosphonate fungicide marketed under the trade name Agri-fos. Phosphonate is a neutralized form of phosphorous acid that works not by direct antagonism of Phytophthora, but by stimulating various kinds of immune responses on the part of the tree. It is mostly environmentally benign if not applied to nontarget plants and can be applied either as an injection into the tree stem or as a spray to the bole. When applying Agri-fos as a spray, it must be combined with an organosilicate surfactant, Pentra-bark, to enable the product to adhere to the tree trunk long enough to be absorbed by the tree. Agri-fos has been very effective in preventing tree infections, but it must be applied when visible symptoms of P. ramorum on other trees in the immediate neighborhood are still relatively distant; otherwise, the tree to be treated likely is already infected, but visible symptoms have not yet developed (especially true for tanoak). However, later extensive field trials showed that phosphonate (also called phosphite) had little if any beneficial effect.

Trials of silvicultural methods for treating P. ramorum began in Humboldt County in northwest coastal California in 2006. The trials have taken place on a variety of infested properties both private and public and have generally focused on varying levels and kinds of host removal. The largest (50 acres (200,000 m^{2})) and most replicated trials have involved removal of tanoak and bay laurel by chainsaw throughout the infested stand, both with and without subsequent underburning designed to eliminate small seedlings and infested leaf litter. Other treatments included host removal in a modified "shaded fuelbreak" design in which all bay laurel is removed, but not all tanoaks; bay and tanoak removal using herbicides; and removal of bay laurel alone. The results of these treatments are still being monitored, but repeated sampling has so far detected only very small amounts of P. ramorum in the soil or on vegetation in the treated sites.

=== Nursery management ===
Research and development in managing P. ramorum in nursery settings extends from P. ramorum in the individual plant, to P. ramorum in the nursery environment, to the pathogen's movement across state and national borders in infected plants.

An array of studies have tested the curative and protective effects of various chemical compounds against P. ramorum in plants valued as ornamentals or Christmas trees. Many studies have focused on the four main ornamental hosts of P. ramorum (Rhododendron, Camellia, Viburnum, and Pieris). Several effective compounds have been found; some of the most effective include mefenoxam, metalaxyl, dimethomorph, and fenamidone. Many of these studies have converged upon the following conclusions: chemical compounds are, in general, more effective as preventives than as curatives; when used preventively, chemical compounds must be reapplied at various intervals; and chemical compounds can mask the symptoms of P. ramorum infection in the host plant, potentially interfering with inspections for quarantine efforts. In general, these compounds suppress but do not eradicate the pathogen, and some researchers are concerned that with repeated use the pathogen may become resistant to them. These studies and conclusions are summarized by Kliejunas.

Another area of research and evolving practice deals with eliminating P. ramorum from nursery environments in which it is established to prevent human-mediated pathogen movement within the ornamental plant trade. One way of approaching this is through a robust quarantine and inspection program, which the various federal and state regulatory agencies have implemented. Under the federal P. ramorum quarantine program implemented by USDA APHIS, nurseries in California, Oregon, and Washington are regulated and must participate in an annual inspection regimen; nurseries in the 14 infested counties in coastal California, plus the limited infested area in Curry County, Oregon, must participate in a more stringent inspection schedule when shipping out of this area.

Much of the research into disinfesting nurseries has focused on the voluntary best management practices (BMPs) that nurseries can implement to prevent P. ramorum's introduction into the nursery and movement from plant to plant. In 2008, a group of nursery industry organizations issued a list of BMPs that includes subsections on pest prevention/management, training, internal/external monitoring/audits, records/traceability, and documentation. The document includes such specific recommendations as "Avoid overhead irrigation of high-risk plants"; "After every crop rotation, disinfect propagation mist beds, sorting area, cutting benches, machines and tools to minimize the spread or introduction of pathogens"; and "Nursery personnel should attend one or more P. ramorum trainings conducted by qualified personnel or document self-training".

Research on control of P. ramorum in nurseries has also focused on disinfesting irrigation water containing P. ramorum inoculum. Irrigation water can become infested from bay trees in the forest (if the irrigation source is a stream), from bay trees overhanging irrigation ponds, from runoff from infested forests, or from recirculated irrigation water. Experiments in Germany with three types of filters—slow sand filters, lava filters, and constructed wetlands—showed that the first two removed P. ramorum from the irrigation water completely, while 37% of the post-treatment water samples from the constructed wetland still contained P. ramorum.

Along with proper irrigation practices, ground cover can be an effective management practice for ornamental plants in nursery settings. Covering the ground with a 5 to 7 cm layer of gravel can prevent splash dispersal of propagules onto ornamental plants that are grown in containers. This practice can also significantly suppress the disease.

Since P. ramorum can persist for an undetermined period of time within the soil profile, management programs in nurseries should also deal with delineating the pathogen's distribution in nursery soil and eliminating it from infested areas. A variety of chemical options has been tested for soil disinfestation, including such chemicals as chloropicrin, metham sodium, iodomethane, and dazomet. Lab tests indicated that all of these chemicals were effective when applied to infested soil in glass jars. Additionally, tests on volunteer nurseries with infested soil demonstrated that dazomet (trade name Basamid) fumigation followed by a 14-day tarping period successfully removed P. ramorum from the soil profile. Other soil disinfestation practices under investigation, or in which interest has been expressed, include steam sterilization, solarization, and paving of infested areas.

=== General sanitation in infested areas ===
One of the most important aspects of P. ramorum control involves interrupting the human-mediated movement of the pathogen by ensuring that infested materials do not move from location to location. While enforceable quarantines perform part of this function, basic cleanliness when working or recreating in infested areas is also important. In most cases, cleanliness practices involve ridding potentially infested surfaces—such as shoes, vehicles, and pets—of foliage and mud before leaving the infested area. The demands of implementing these practices become more complex when large numbers of people are working in infested areas, as in construction, timber harvesting, or wildfire suppression. The California Department of Forestry and Fire Protection and USDA Forest Service have implemented guidelines and mitigation requirements for the latter two situations; basic information about cleanliness in P. ramorum-infested areas can be found at the California Oak Mortality Task Force web site (www.suddenoakdeath.org) under the "Treatment and Management" section (subsection "Sanitation and Reducing Spread").

== Government agency involvement ==
In England in 2009, the Forestry Commission, DEFRA, the Food and Environment Research Agency, Cornwall County Council, and Natural England are working together to record the locations and deal with this disease. Natural England is offering grant funding through its Environmental Stewardship, Countryside Stewardship, and Environmentally Sensitive Area schemes to clear rhododendron. In 2011, the Forestry Commission started felling 10,000 acres (40 km^{2}) of larch forest in the south-west of England, as an attempt to halt the spread of the disease. In 2023 the Forestry Commission issued a Statutory Plant Health Notice to Sheffield and Rotherham Wildlife Trust ordering it to remove over 1,000 trees at their nature reserve at Wyming Brook. In Northern Ireland at the end of 2011, the Department of Agriculture and Rural Development's Forest Service began felling 14 hectares of affected Larch woodland at Moneyscalp, on the edge of Tollymore Forest Park in County Down.

== See also ==
- Acute oak decline
- Forest pathology
- Forest disturbance of invasive insects and diseases in the United States
