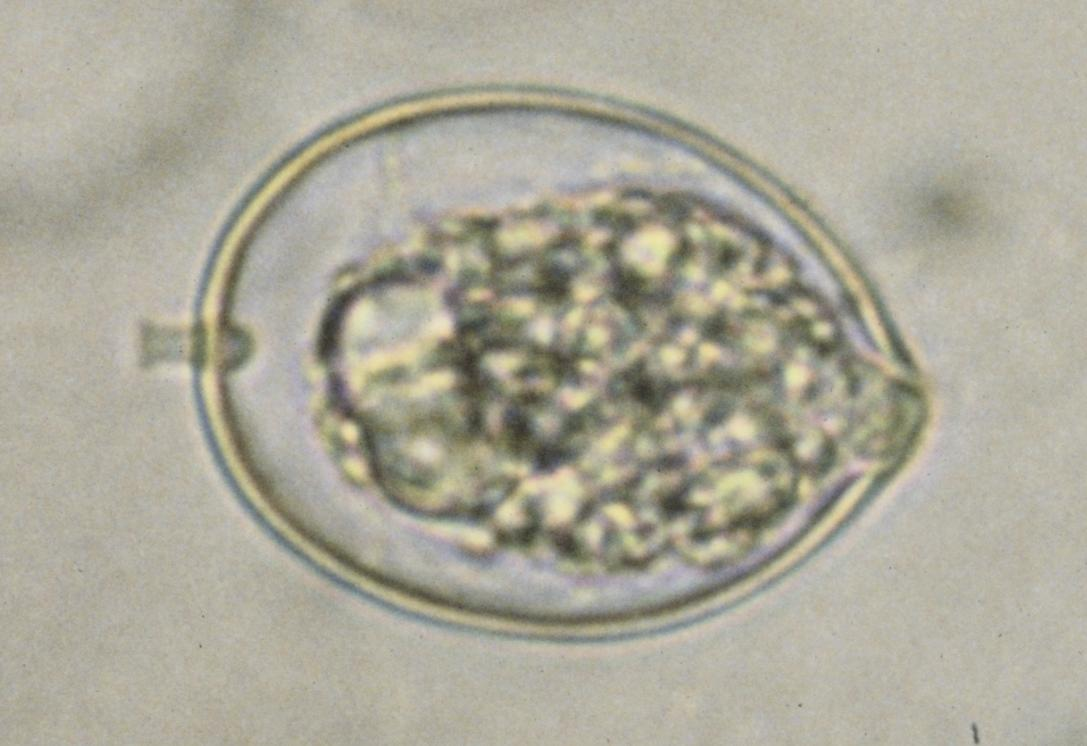
- Microscopic view of sporangium of Phytophthora cactorum

Scientific classification
- Domain: Eukaryota
- Supergroup: Stramenopiles
- Division: Oomycota
- Class: Peronosporomycetes
- Order: Peronosporales
- Family: Peronosporaceae
- Genus: Phytophthora
- Species: P. cactorum

Binomial name
- Phytophthora cactorum (Lebert & Cohn) J. Schröt., (1886)

Varieties
- Phytophthora cactorum var. applanata

Synonyms
- Peronospora cactorum Lebert & Cohn, (1870); Phloeophthora cactorum (Lebert & Cohn) G.W. Wilson, (1914); Phytophthora fagi R. Hartig, (1876); Phytophthora omnivora de Bary, (1881)

= Phytophthora cactorum =

Species of single-celled organism

Phytophthora cactorum is a fungal-like plant pathogen belonging to the Oomycota phylum. It is the causal agent of root rot on rhododendron and many other species, as well as leather rot of strawberries.

== Hosts, symptoms, and diagnosis ==
Phytophthora cactorum has an extremely wide host range, and can infect over 200 species or 160 genera of trees, ornamentals, and fruit crops. In general, P. cactorum is capable of infecting both young and old plants, and causes root rots and crown rots of the many genera it infects. Although the symptoms this pathogen produces varies between the types of organisms it infects, in general disease occurs during periods that are both wet and warm. Furthermore, most infections are caused by zoospores entering the plant through wounds.

On older trees, P. cactorum causes the formation of sap exuding dark colored cankers on the trunks of trees, as well as leaf size and number reduction, chlorosis, and dieback of branches. The diagnosis of a P. cactorum infection of trees, is based on the identification of symptoms, in particular the oozing cankers, and confirmation of symptoms in a diagnosis lab or utilization of a field ELISA detection kit. P. cactorum can be a major problem in apple orchards, as it can cause crown, collar, and root rots in apple trees. When infecting apple trees, the organism can attack through wounds either above or below the soil line, impairing phloem and root function, and causing stunting, foliar disorders, and death after several years. Furthermore, because the pathogen causes damage to the phloem of the tree, one diagnostic method is to check for necrotic phloem tissue at the base of the tree which will be orange to red-brown in the early stages and dark brown in the later stages of infection.

A good example of P. cactorum causing foliar disease is on ginseng. Foliar disease of ginseng usually occurs during May and early June, causing the leaves to become transparent and papery. Ginseng foliar infection occurs through the rain splash dispersal of spores from the soil onto above ground wounds. Once infected, P. cactorum works its way down to the roots, rotting them and killing the plant.

P. cactorum is also one of the causal agents of black rot on orchids. When infecting orchids, this organism first produces small black lesions on the pseudobulbs of the orchid, which then enlarge and may engulf the entire pseudobulb, leaf, or move through the rhizomes to other portions of the plant prior to killing it. Diagnosis of orchid black rot by P. cactorum is through the identification of lemon-shaped zoosporangia with either a papilla or a short pedicel, the presence of oospores, or molecular identification. Since there are multiple species of Phytophthora that are capable of causing disease on orchids, classification only to the genus level is required for proper prescription of disease management techniques.

Crown rot or root rot of strawberries is a common example of diseases of fruit crops caused by P. cactorum. On strawberries, P. cactorum infects the roots and the base of the plant causing stunting and reduced leaf size, with possible complete plant collapse later in the season. Similarly to apple trees, crown rots of strawberries caused by P. cactorum can be partially diagnosed by cutting the crown of the plant and observing brown vascular tissues, and root rots by brown or black stunted roots.

Leather rot of strawberry is an additional disease affecting strawberry plants, with P. cactorum being the causal agent. Symptoms of this disease include brown patches or green patches with a brown border in immature fruit, with infected mature fruit displaying a purple to brown color, and becoming hard, leathery, or even mummified. Signs include visible mycelium inside of hollow infected berries, as well as mycelium on the surface of berries. Infected fruit often has an unpleasant taste and odor, which is diagnostic.

== Life cycle ==
P. cactorum is a homothallic (only having one mating type, can mate with itself) oomycete, and displays the right angled mycelial branching with a constriction at the base of the branch, which is highly characteristic of other Phytophthora species. Within the hyphae, they have singular diploid nuclei that are regularly spaced. In addition, young hyphae only have cross walls separating reproductive parts; however older hyphae may have cross walls anywhere. Furthermore, although the hyphae are not the main survival unit of P. cactorum, as long as they are not completely desiccated, they are capable of surviving until just above freezing temperatures.

P. cactorum produces one sexually produced survival spore called an oospore, and one asexually produced survival spore called a chlamydospore. Oospores are double-walled and uninucleate during dormancy, but become multinucleate in preparation for germination. In contrast, the chlamydospores have only one resistant wall and are multinucleate at all stages. Chlamydospores are larger than oospores in size, and are only formed under certain environmental triggers. The trigger for preferential formation of chlamydospores over oospores can be either large temperature or moisture oscillations.

In addition to the chlamydospore, P. cactorum also produces another asexual spore called a sporangium. A sporangia is a multinucleate dispersal structure with a thin wall and papilla that is formed on a sporangiophore. Although the size may vary based on the environmental conditions in which they are formed, the width of a sporangia is always more than 2/3 times than its length. Depending on moisture conditions, sporangia can either germinate or release zoospores.

Zoospores are produced in wet conditions by either oospores or sporangia. Phytophthora cactorum zoospores, are uninucleate, laterally biflagellate, and pear- or lemon-shaped. After being released, zoospores swim to a nearby wound on a suitable host, germinate, and enter wounds to cause a hyphal infection of the roots or crown vascular system.

In Leather Rot of Strawberry, P. cactorum raindrop splash is required to spread the zoospores to the strawberry fruit, unless flood conditions cause the zoospores to be able to swim directly to the fruit.

== Environment ==
Because Phytophthora is a soilborne pathogen, the ideal condition for P. cactorum growth is in saturated soil. P. cactorum stays in the soil as dormant resting oospores and chlamydospores, or within infected plant tissue. When conditions are met and the soil is wet enough, sporangia are produced, carrying on the life cycle of the pathogen. The minimum amount of time the plant must be saturated to produce an infection depends on factors such as genetics, physiological processes, and the environment. However, when a plant is allowed to sit in soil that is heavy and soggy for long periods of time, the chance of infection is increased. A plant's inability to fight off the pathogen is impeded when saturated soil conditions limit the amount of available oxygen for its roots. In many cases, most host plants are the most susceptible to infection during spring and autumn when the soil is wetter and at a more ideal temperature for zoospore production and activity.

== Importance ==
P. cactorum was first described in 1870 as a cactus pathogen. Since then, it has been found to not only infect cacti, but a wide range of plants worldwide. P. cactorum was first reported in the United States in 1858 when infected apple trees were discovered in Michigan. By 1928, it had spread to Canada in the Okanagan Valley, British Columbia. Since then, it has caused around C$2 million in damage per year.

The importance of this oomycete is its vast host range and the damage it causes to major crops. This pathogen can cause root rot that stunts the host's growth and damages vascular tissue, which is especially detrimental to pear and apple orchards. It can also infect strawberry plants and cause crown rot, root rot, and leather rot of the fruit. This pathogen causes millions of dollars in damage, and disease management such as soil fumigation is also expensive.

== Disease management and control ==
The best way to manage P. cactorum is by implementing an integrated management plan. The combination of soil fumigation and proper cultural controls will be the best option for plant health. Recommended chemical controls products include fosetyl-Al, metalaxyl, and etridiazole. Prevention and sanitation are crucial because this pathogen is usually transmitted through cuts or injuries on the plant. The spores are easily transported through irrigation water and will splash to nearby plants. Elevating your plants above the ground can help to prevent infection. The pathogen thrives in moist soils therefore it is important to avoid very saturated soils as much as possible and one should work to prepare their soil for adequate drainage during the wet periods. Soil drainage and low soil pH may help to reduce the disease. Fertilizer regimen methods have been used to control against P. cactorum. These fertilizers include organic materials that release ammonia, nitrous acid, and amendments to reduce the pH to less than 4. The use of raised beds and a carefully managed drip irrigation system will be important cultural practices that can be implemented. There are some form of biological controls that have been found to be somewhat successful with Enterobacter aerogenes and Trichoderma.

== Pathogenesis ==
When able to culture the P. cactorum on different media, it will produce a maple wilt associated phytotoxin. These phytotoxins cause browning of veins, desiccation of apple leaves, and wilting of tomato cuttings. Studies have shown that this the P. cactorum phytotoxin is hydrophilic in nature and will not move to the organic solvents. The chemical properties of this toxin seem to be similar to those of other Phytopthora species. Within the plant, the P. cactorum phytotoxin is most likely xylem transported through and can accumulate in the space in between leaves where it causes desiccation and withering.

A toxin protein similar to other oomycete elicitins based on apparent molecular weight, isoelectric point, amino acid composition, and host pathology induction activity was isolated from P. cactorum culture. The whole genome sequence of a then-new isolate of P. cactorum was obtained in 2018, revealing 39 elicitin genes in that isolate. Numerous isolates of P. cactorum have been described, however, and the specific toxins affecting specific plants have not been well-studied.

In pathogenicity tests on strawberry plants in a greenhouse, the fruit isolates caused little disease, while strawberry root system isolates were highly aggressive. P. cactorum phytotoxin is thought to have a role in disease development and pathogenesis, however further study is required.
