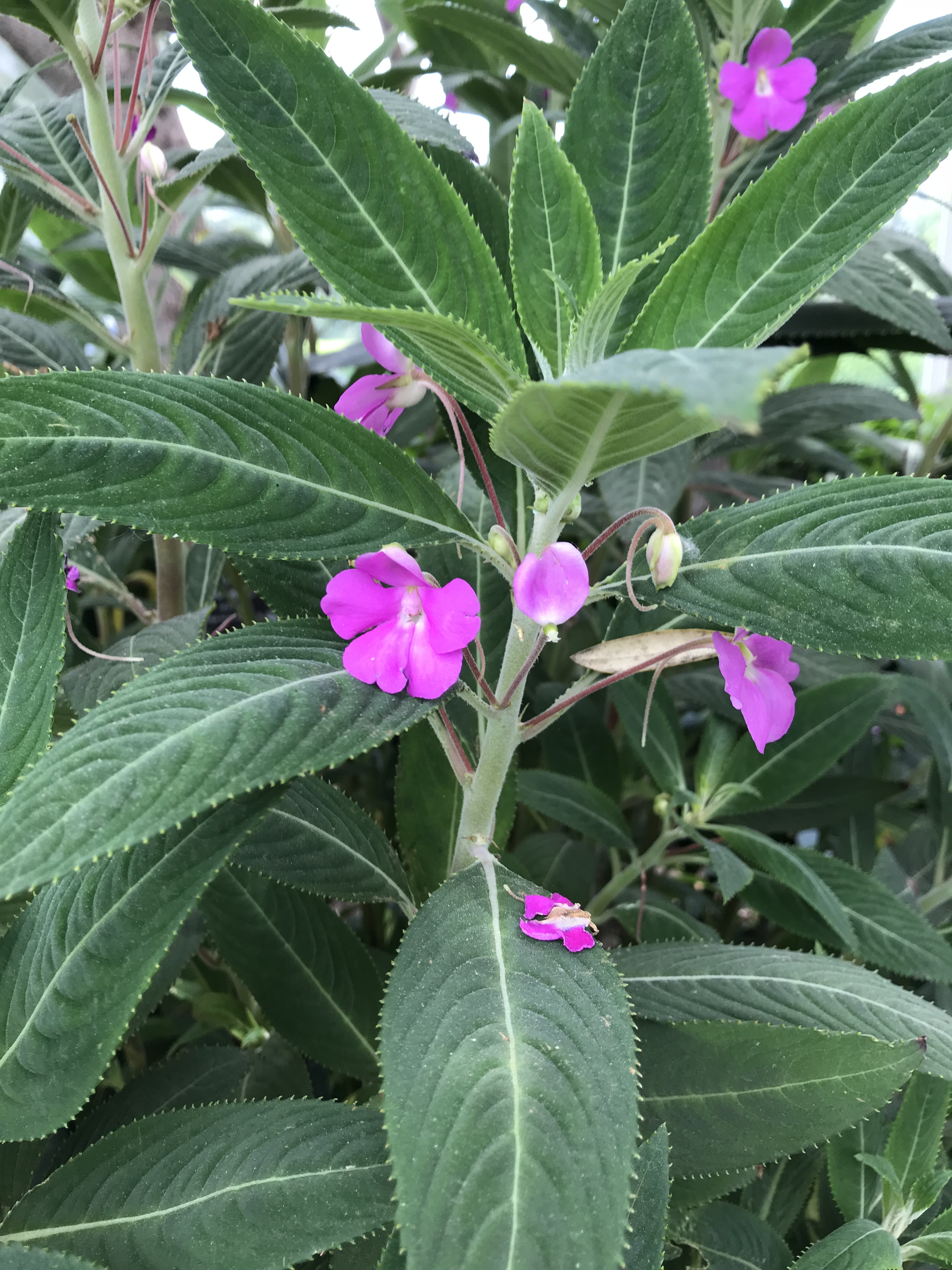

Scientific classification
- Kingdom: Plantae
- Clade: Tracheophytes
- Clade: Angiosperms
- Clade: Eudicots
- Clade: Asterids
- Order: Ericales
- Family: Balsaminaceae
- Genus: Impatiens
- Species: I. irvingii

Binomial name
- Impatiens irvingii Hook.f. ex Oliv.

= Impatiens irvingii =

Species of flowering plant

Impatiens irvingii is a species of flowering plant in the family Balsaminaceae. It is native to tropical Africa.

This is a variable plant. In general, it is a perennial herb with stems up to 1.5 meters long, or occasionally longer. They are rarely erect, more often prostrate or somewhat upright. The stems are succulent with swollen nodes, often red in color or green tinged with red, and sometimes hairy or velvety. The spirally arranged leaves have generally lance-shaped, toothed blades up to 16 centimeters long. They are dark green and waxy on the upper surfaces and silvery green on the undersides. They are sometimes hairy. Light purple flowers grow in the leaf axils. They have hairy bracts and sepals. The back sepal tapers into a long spur. The petals are up to 3 centimeters long. The fruit capsule is up to 1.8 centimeters long.

The natural habitat types of the plant include moist and wet areas such as moist forests and swamps.

In Nigeria, this plant is associated with the introduced snail Indoplanorbis exustus.

It is a host plant for the downy mildew fungus Pseudoperonospora cubensis, which causes red spots on the leaves and, in severe cases, necrosis.
