= Pythium ultimum =

Scientific classification
- Domain: Eukaryota
- Supergroup: Stramenopiles
- Division: Oomycota
- Class: Peronosporomycetes
- Order: Peronosporales
- Family: Pythiaceae
- Genus: Pythium
- Species: P. ultimum

Binomial name
- Pythium ultimum Trow, (1901)

Varieties
- P. u. var. ultimum; P. u. var. sporangiiferum

Pathogenic oomycete

Pythium ultimum is a plant pathogen. It causes damping off and root rot diseases of hundreds of diverse plant hosts including maize, soybean, potato, wheat, fir, and many ornamental species. P. ultimum belongs to the peronosporalean lineage of oomycetes, along with other important plant pathogens such as Phytophthora spp. and many genera of downy mildews. P. ultimum is a frequent inhabitant of fields, freshwater ponds, and decomposing vegetation in most areas of the world. Contributing to the widespread distribution and persistence of P. ultimum is its ability to grow saprotrophically in soil and plant residue. This trait is also exhibited by most Pythium spp. but not by the related Phytophthora spp., which can only colonize living plant hosts.

== Pathology and disease management ==
P. ultimum is a species complex that includes P. u. var. ultimum and P. u. var. sporangiiferum. One major distinguishing feature between these two genetically distinct organisms is the production of zoospores (swimming spores) -- which are produced only rarely by P. u. var. ultimum. Asexual reproduction of both P. u. var. sporangiiferum and P. u. var. ultimum results in the formation of sporangia that develop at the tips of hyphae. Wind, water or other disruptions to the soil can disperse the pathogen by causing the sporangia to detach. In the case of P. u. var. sporangiiferum , the free sporangia release zoospores in response to outside stimuli. These zoospores can then "swim" to susceptible root tissues. This infection process is referred to as "indirect germination". Contrary to P. u. var. sporangiiferum , the free sporangia of P. u. var. ultimum do not release zoospores, instead, they undergo a process called "direct germination", during which the sporangia themselves form invasive hyphae that serve as the primary inoculum source. Generation of these infectious hyphae is initiated once the free sporangia have made contact with susceptible plant tissues. Once attached, they form appressoria; specialized infection structures that can generate enough turgor pressure to punch through the plant cuticle. From there, both variants engage in necrotrophy, a process by which pathogenic organisms kill host cells in order to access and incorporate their contents to meet their nutritional needs.P. u. var. ultimum in particular, is known to release a cascade of unique effector proteins to break down and degrade various cellular components of plant tissues. Both species make oospores, which are thick-walled structures produced by sexual recombination that can serve as survival structures during times of stress. Both varieties are self-fertile (homothallic), which means that a single strain can mate with itself. One important ecological difference between the different types of spores produced by these organisms, is that sporangia and zoospores are short-lived, while the thick-walled oospores can persist for years within soil, surviving even winter freezes. Common signs of a Pythium infection include stunting of the plants, brown coloration of root-tips, and wilting of the plant during the warm part of the day. Management of disease is challenging but focuses on sanitation, fungicides, and biological control. Fungicides include mefenoxam, thiadiazole, etridiazole, propamocarb, dimethomorph, and phosphonates. Biological control agents include the bacteria Bacillus subtilis, Enterobacter cloacae, Streptomyces griseoviridis, and the fungi Candida oleophila, Gliocladium catenulatum, Trichoderma harzianum, and T. virens.

Effective resistance in the plant host is generally not available. Sanitation is very important since the pathogen can be easily introduced into pasteurized soil or even soil-free potting mixes on dirty tools or pots. Especially in greenhouses, fungus gnats may also help move the pathogen from place to place. A recent study of greenhouses in Michigan revealed that the same pathogen populations were responsible for the root rot of all greenhouse ornamental plants over a two-year period. These results stress the importance of sanitation and encourage greenhouse growers to improve their scouting of all incoming plant material to prevent additional root rot.

== Genetics ==
Pythium ultimum is divided into varieties ultimum and sporangiiferum, the genomes of both of which have been sequenced. Analysis of the genomes suggest that the two species encode 15,290 and 14,086 proteins, respectively.

Samples of Pythium sp. isolates from soils in Japan were analyzed phylogenetically; the phylogenetic trees were divided into five monophyletic clades, proposed as new genera (Pythium, Elongisporangium, Ovatisporangium, Globisporangium, and Pilasporangium). Under this new phylogeny, P. ultimum would be renamed to Globisporangium ultimum.

Liang et al., 2020 finds GH55 – common in some other Pythium spp. – is absent from this species.

== Microbiome impacts on P. ultimum disease incidence and severity ==
While fungicides and proper sanitation measures remain important means of Pythium control and management, natural means of suppression via the formation of disease suppressive environments, is becoming better understood, and could pave the way for more sustainable practices in commercial production of crops susceptible to P. ultimum.

Disease suppressive environments are defined as environments in which environmental conditions are favorable, a susceptible host is present along with a virulent pathogen, but disease levels remain low. The soil microbiome of plants is known to influence soil-borne diseases incidence and severity by either indirectly combatting disease by fortifying plant defenses or through direct microbe-microbe interactions, thus helping to create a disease suppressive environment. Both P. u. var. sporangiiferum and P. u. var. ultimum are not immune to the impacts of microbiome-based disease suppression. Many studies have correlated increased suppression of P. ultimum with an increase in total abundance of microorganisms present in growth media microbiomes. For example, increased microbial activity and biomass has been correlated with a decrease in P. ultimum induced damping-off of cucumber. The method of microbe-mediated suppression of Pythium remains uncertain, however, these and other studies suggest that competition in the rhizosphere for carbon and nitrogen resources could play a role. Another theory suggests that at high enough concentrations, bacteria can quickly coat and protect susceptible plant tissues, leaving no room for Pythium adherence and subsequent infection.
