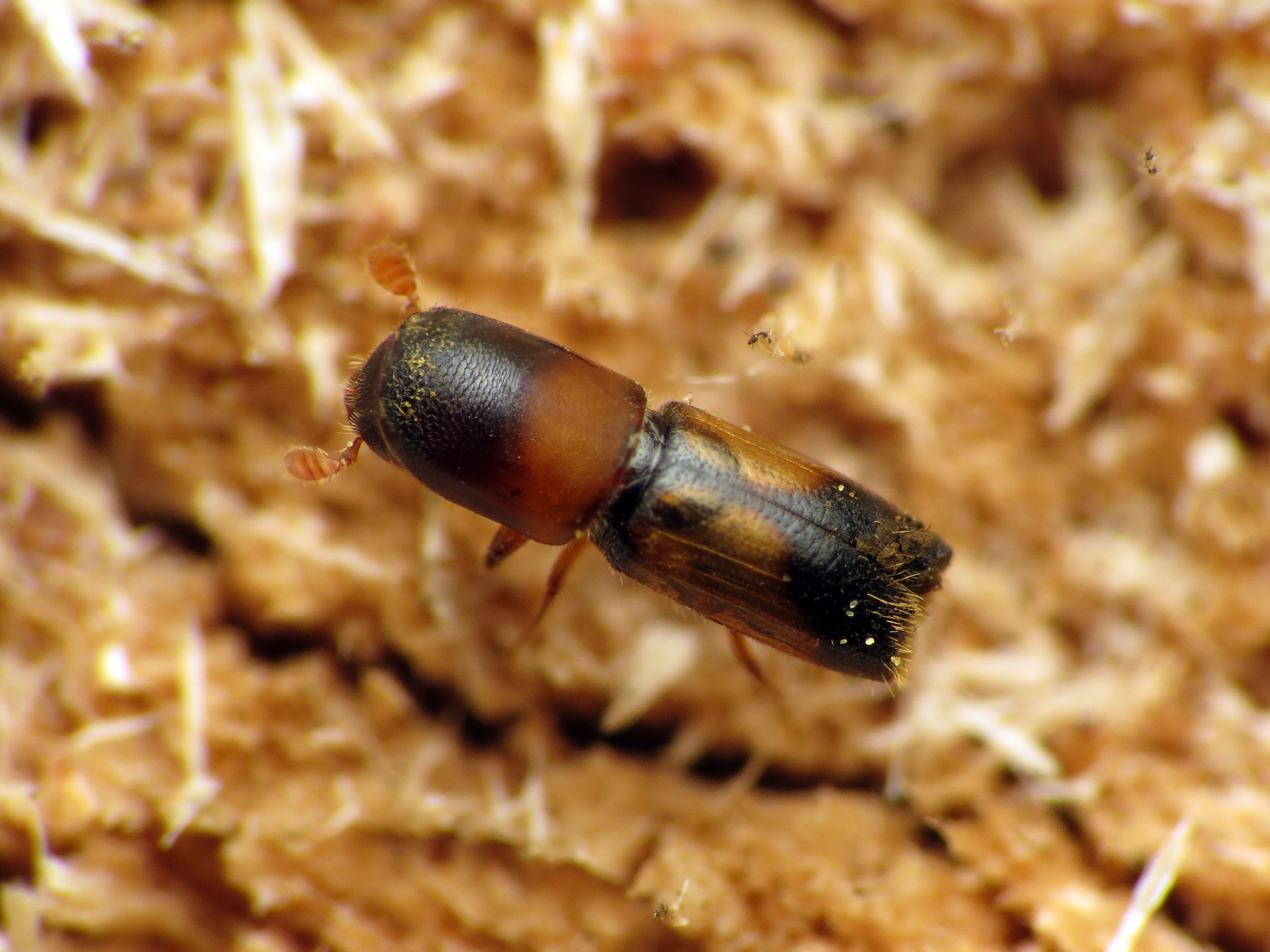
- Monarthrum fasciatum

Scientific classification
- Kingdom: Animalia
- Phylum: Arthropoda
- Class: Insecta
- Order: Coleoptera
- Suborder: Polyphaga
- Infraorder: Cucujiformia
- Family: Curculionidae
- Subtribe: Corthylina
- Genus: Monarthrum; Kirsch, 1866

= Monarthrum =

Genus of beetles

Monarthrum is a genus of typical bark beetles in the family Curculionidae. There are about 5 described species in Monarthrum.

== Species ==
- Monarthrum dentigerum Wood & Bright, 1992
- Monarthrum fasciatum Wood & Bright, 1992
- Monarthrum huachucae Wood, 1959
- Monarthrum mali Wood & Bright, 1992 (apple wood stainer)
- Monarthrum scutellare Wood & Bright, 1992
