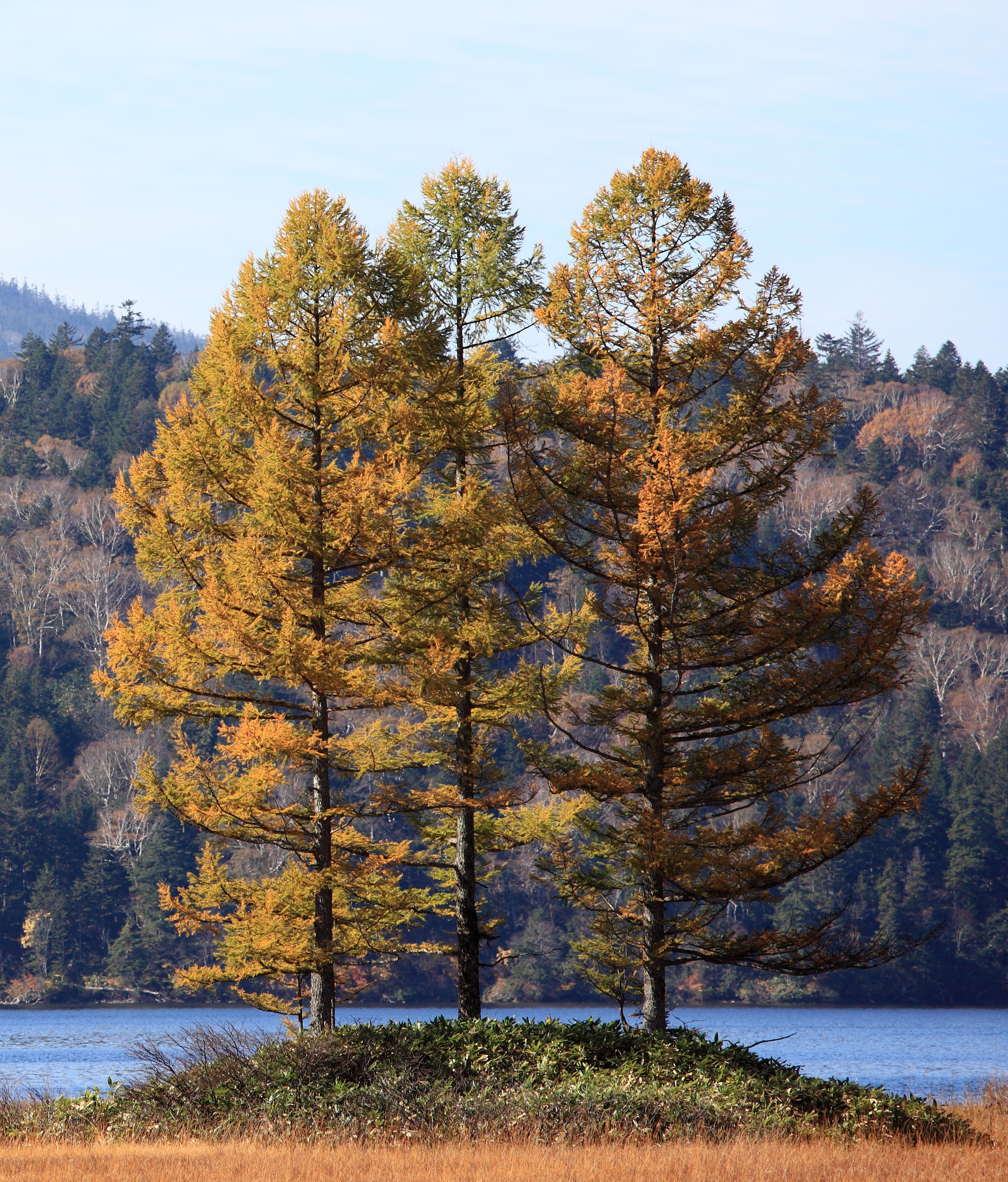
- Larix kaempferi in autumn in Oze National Park, Fukushima, Japan

Conservation status
- Least Concern (IUCN 3.1)

Scientific classification
- Kingdom: Plantae
- Clade: Embryophytes
- Clade: Tracheophytes
- Clade: Gymnosperms
- Division: Pinophyta
- Class: Pinopsida
- Order: Pinales
- Family: Pinaceae
- Genus: Larix
- Species: L. kaempferi

Binomial name
- Larix kaempferi (Lamb.) Carr.

= Larix kaempferi =

Japanese larch

Species of flowering plant

Larix kaempferi, the Japanese larch or karamatsu (唐松 or 落葉松) in Japanese, is a species of larch native to Japan, in the mountains of Chūbu and Kantō regions in central Honshū.

It is a medium-sized to large deciduous coniferous tree reaching 20–40 m tall, with a trunk up to 1 m diameter. The crown is broad conic; both the main branches and the side branches are level, the side branches only rarely drooping. The shoots are dimorphic, with growth divided into long shoots (typically 10–50 cm long) and bearing several buds, and short shoots only 1–2 mm long with only a single bud. The leaves are needle-like, light glaucous green, 2–5 cm (0.8–2.0 in) long; they turn bright yellow to orange before they fall in the autumn, leaving the pinkish-brown shoots bare until the next spring.

The cones are erect, ovoid-conic and 2–3.5 cm long, with 30–50 reflexed seed scales; they are green when immature, turning brown and opening to release the seeds when mature, 4–6 months after pollination. The old cones commonly remain on the tree for many years, turning dull grey-black.

It grows at altitudes up to 2,900 m (9,500 ft) on well-drained soils, avoiding waterlogged ground.

The scientific name honours Engelbert Kaempfer. It is also sometimes known by the synonym Larix leptolepis.

== Uses ==
Japanese larch is an important tree in forestry plantations, being grown throughout central and northern Japan (north to Hokkaidō), and also widely in northern Europe, particularly Ireland and Britain. The wood is tough and durable, and is used for general construction work. Small larch poles are commonly used for fencing.

== Cultivation ==
Larix kaempferi is used for ornamental purposes in parks and gardens. It is also widely used as material for bonsai. The dwarf cultivars 'Blue Dwarf', growing to 1.5 m (4.9 ft) tall and broad, and 'Nana', growing to 1 m (3.3 ft) tall and broad, have gained the Royal Horticultural Society's Award of Garden Merit.

== Diseases ==
In late 2009 Phytophthora ramorum or sudden oak death disease was first found in Japanese larch trees, in the English counties of Devon, Cornwall and Somerset. The disease was found in Counties Waterford and Tipperary in Ireland the following year.

== Gallery ==
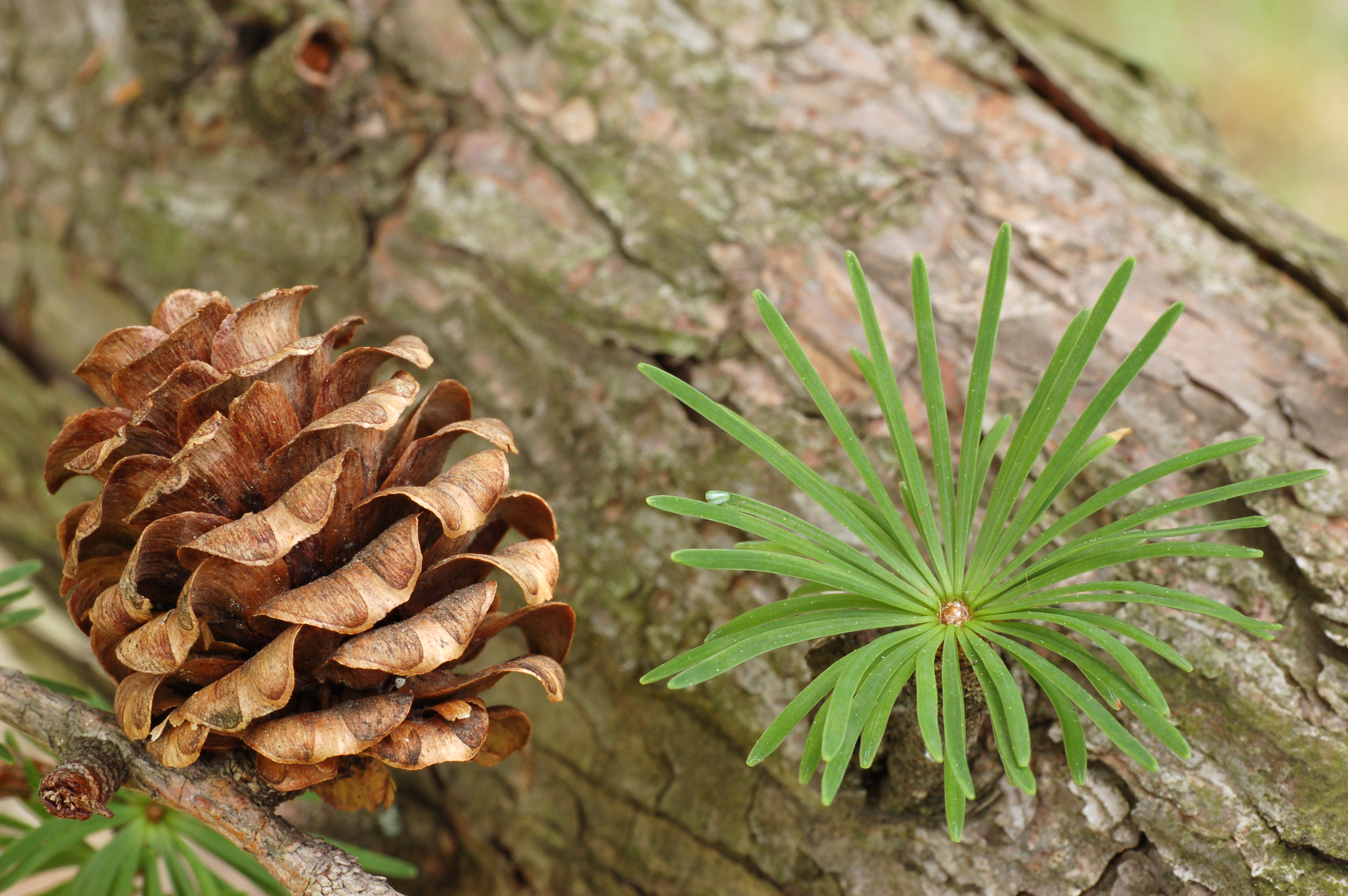
Old cone and young needles growing out of a branch

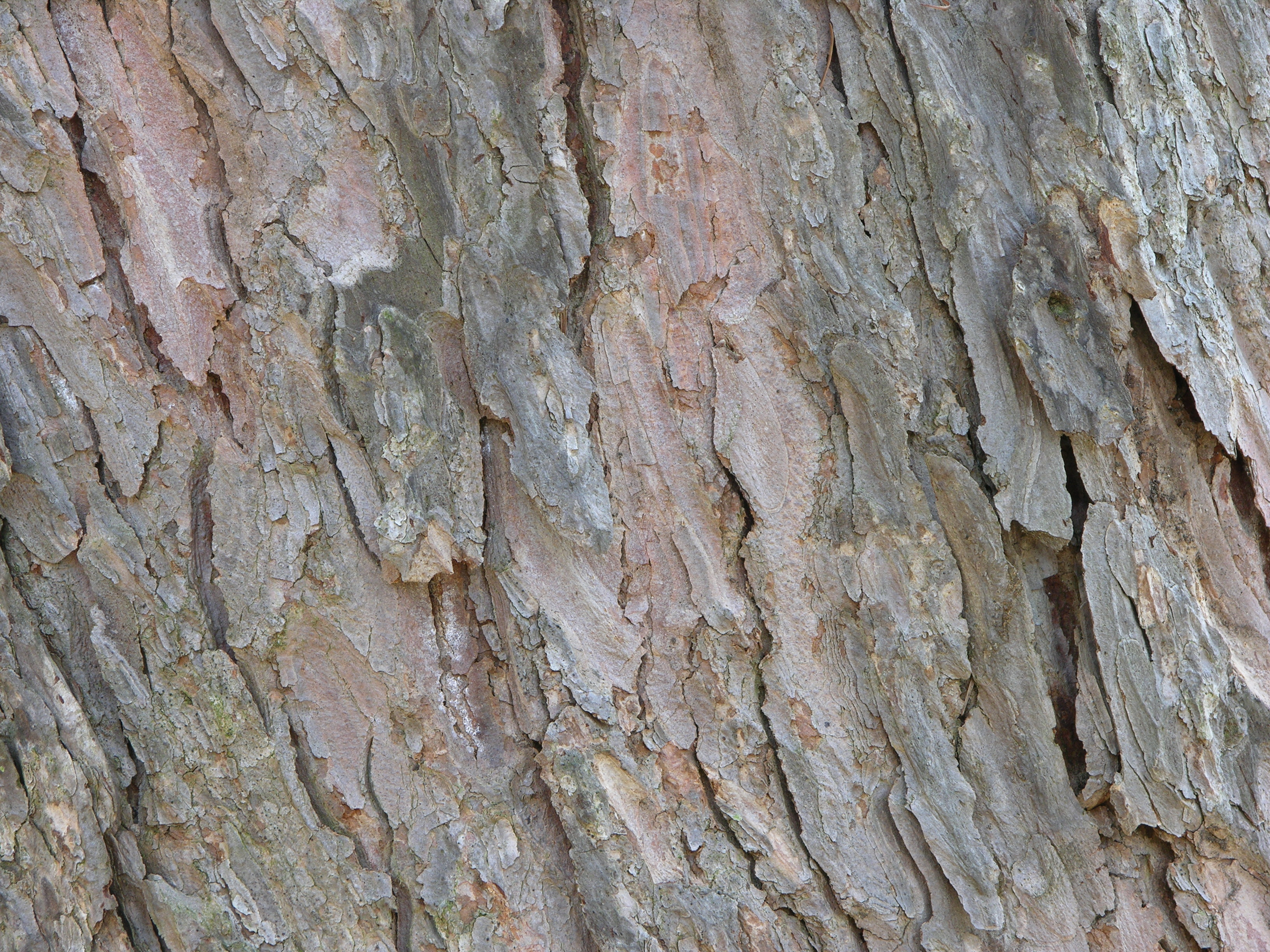
Bark on the tree's trunk

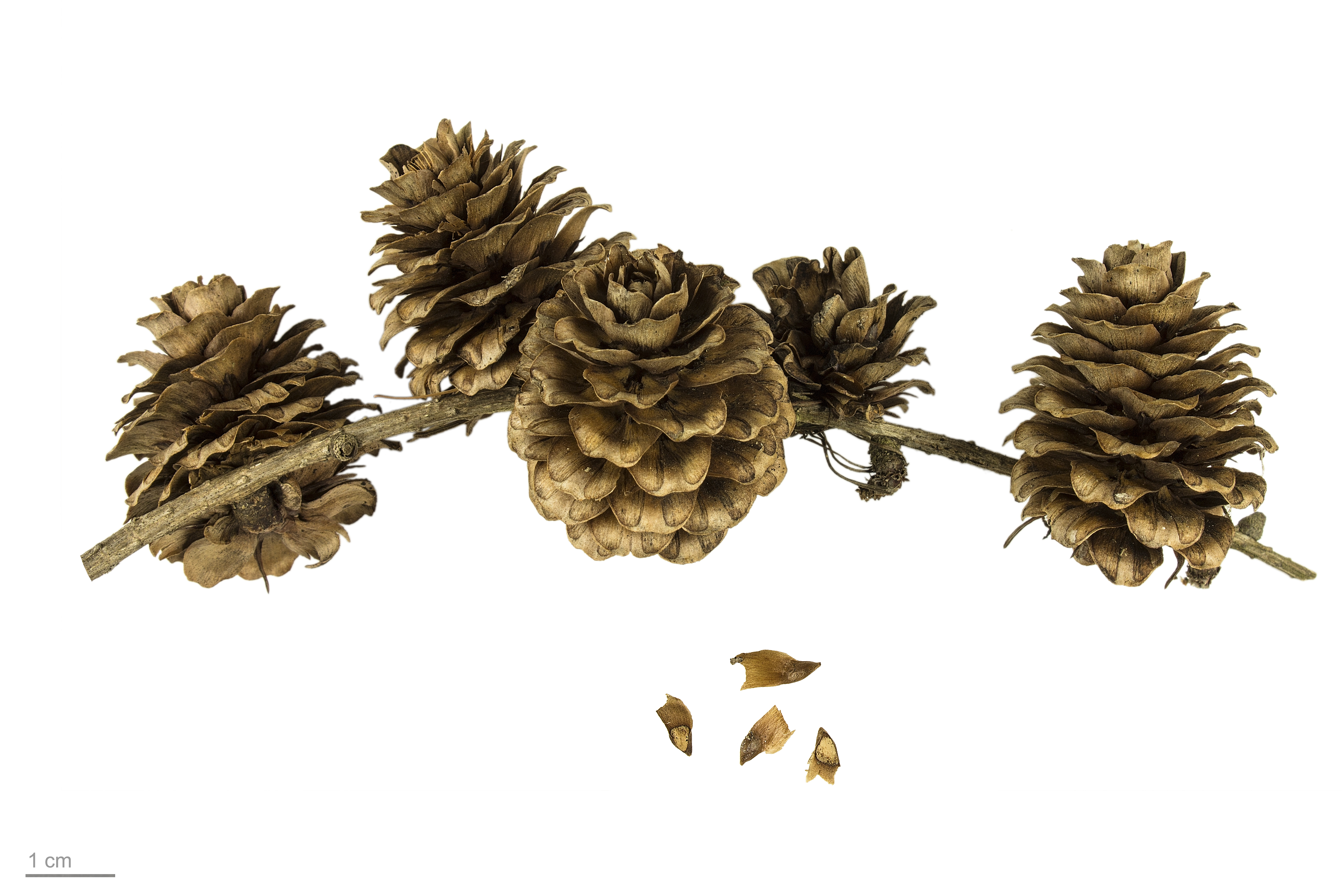
Cones and seeds - museum specimen

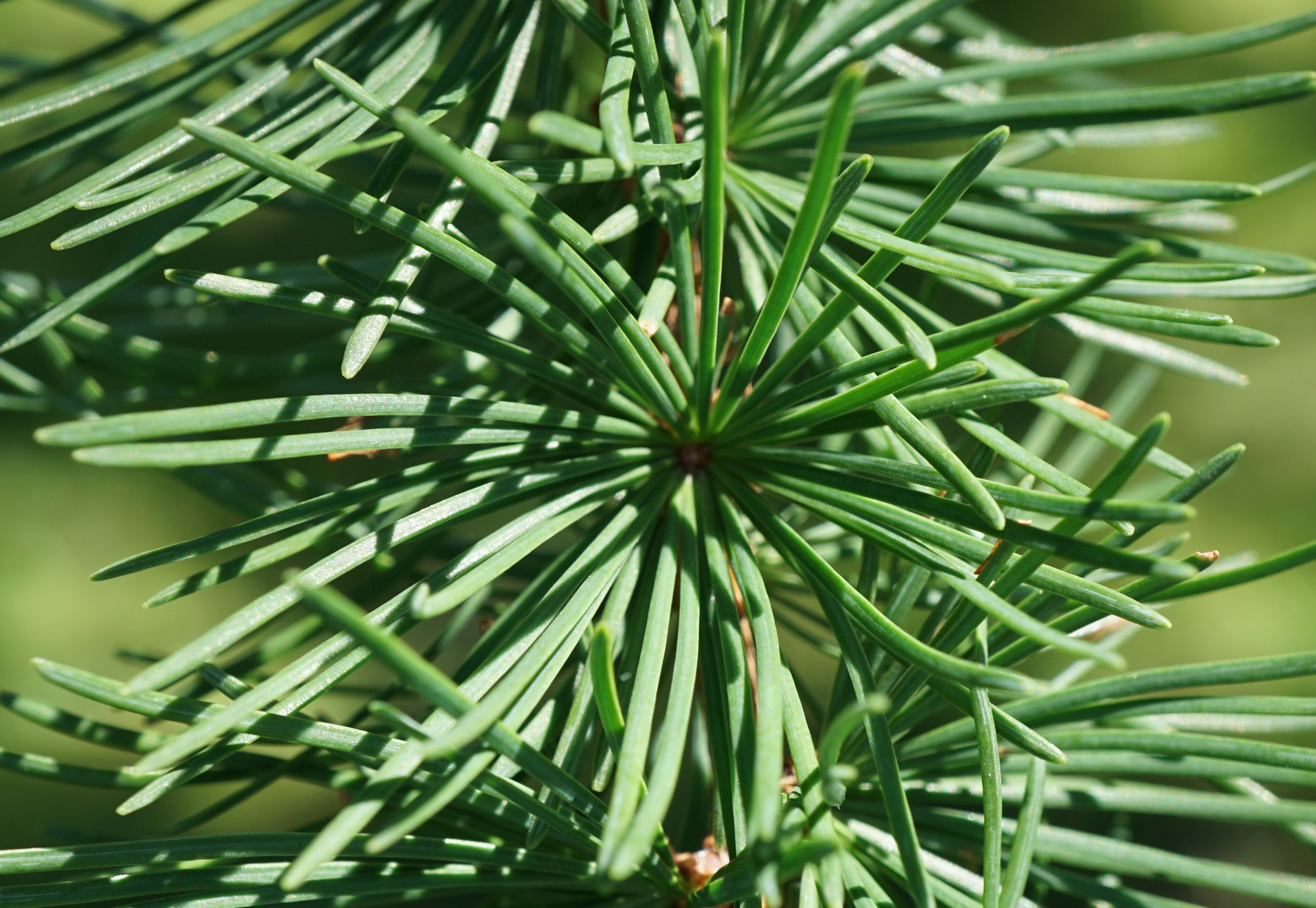
Needles

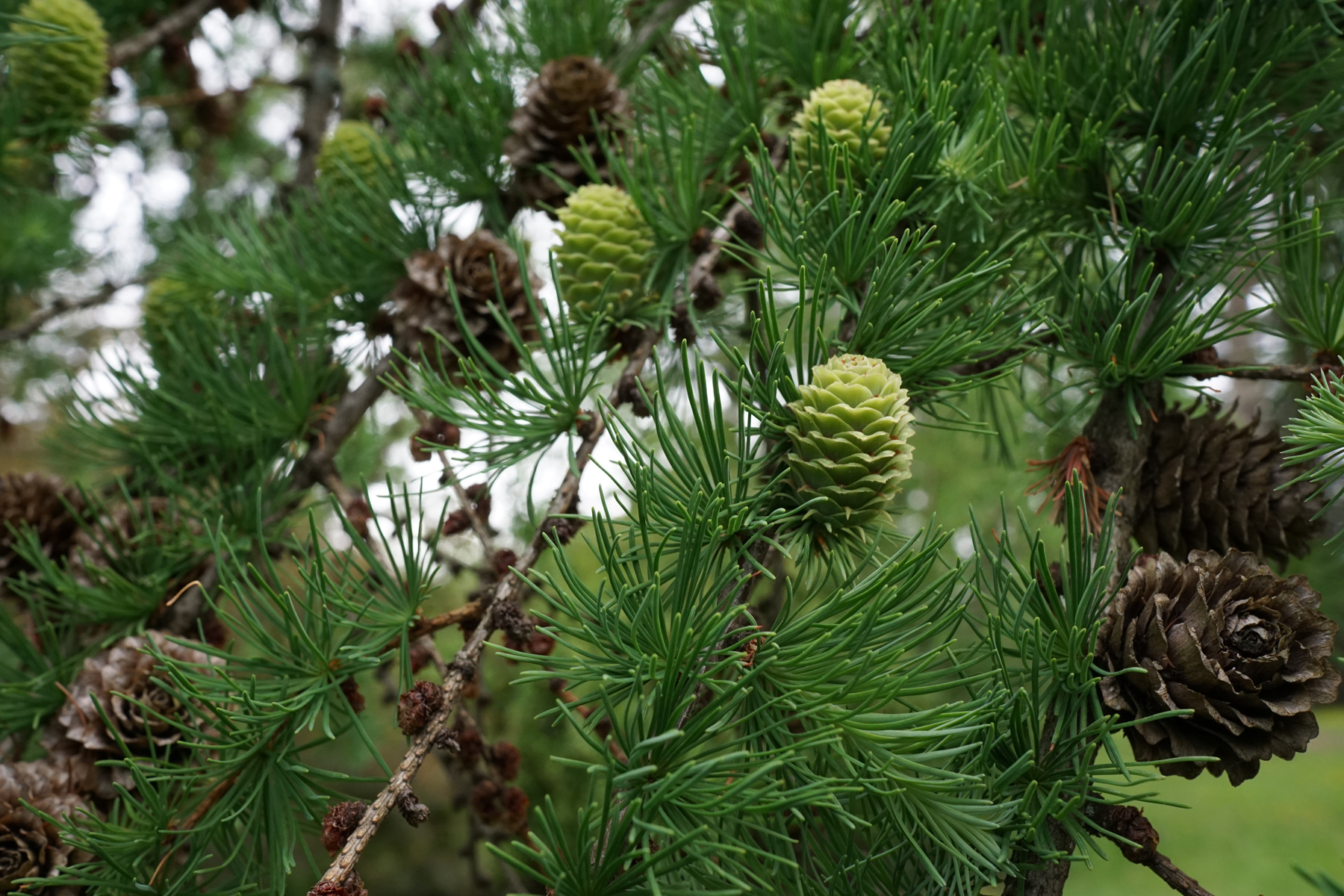
Developing seed cones

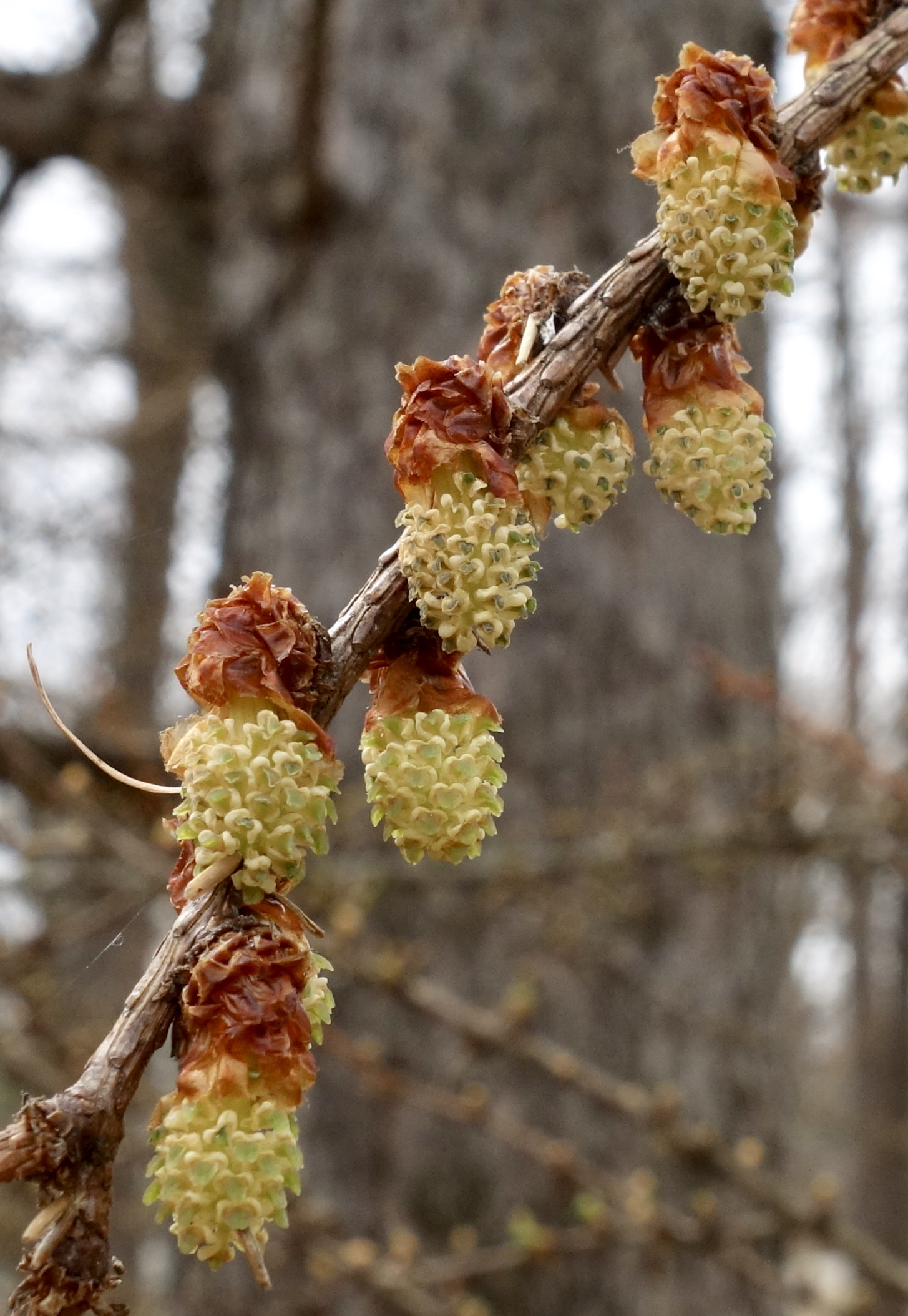
Male cones

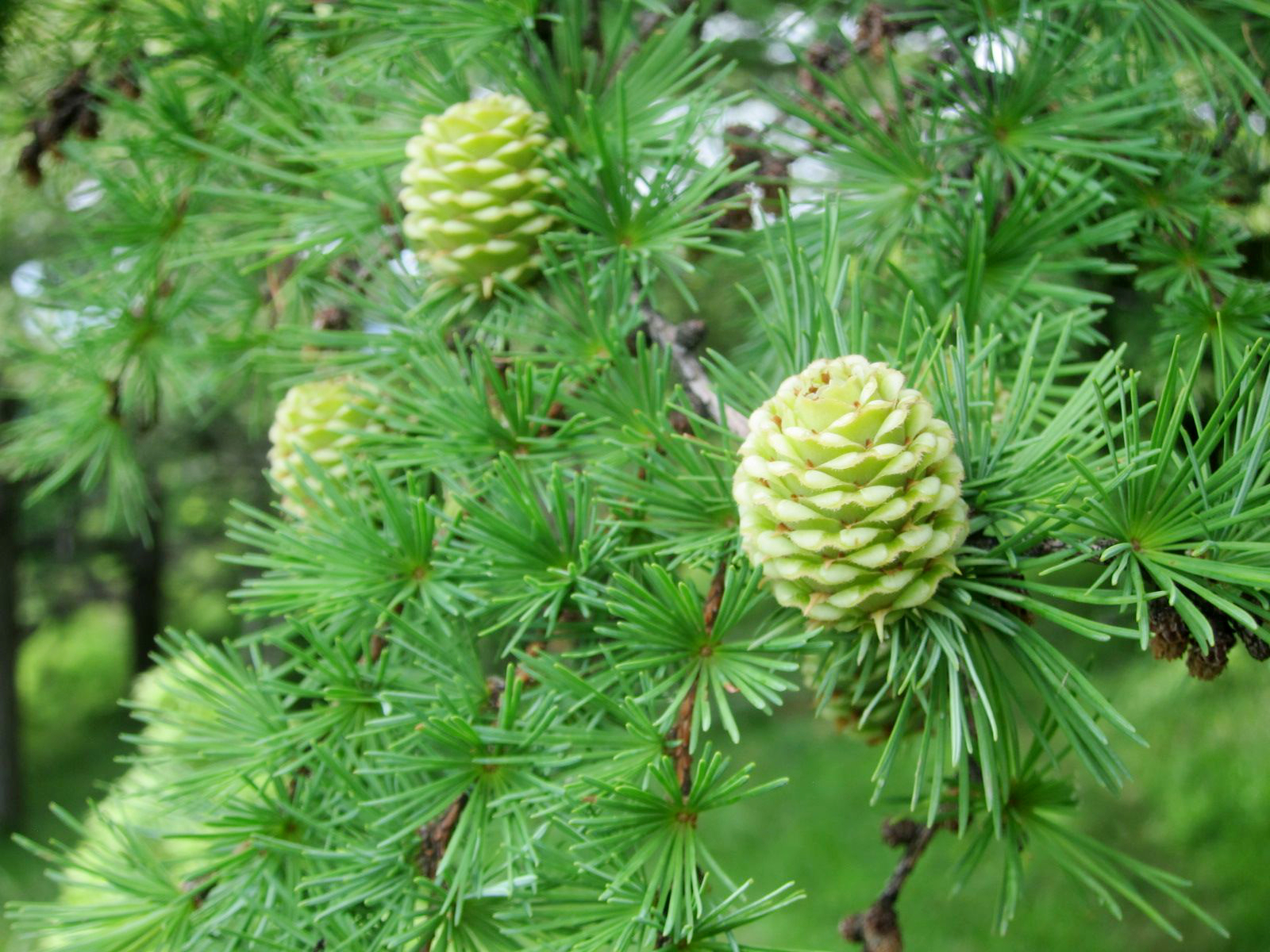
Young female cone

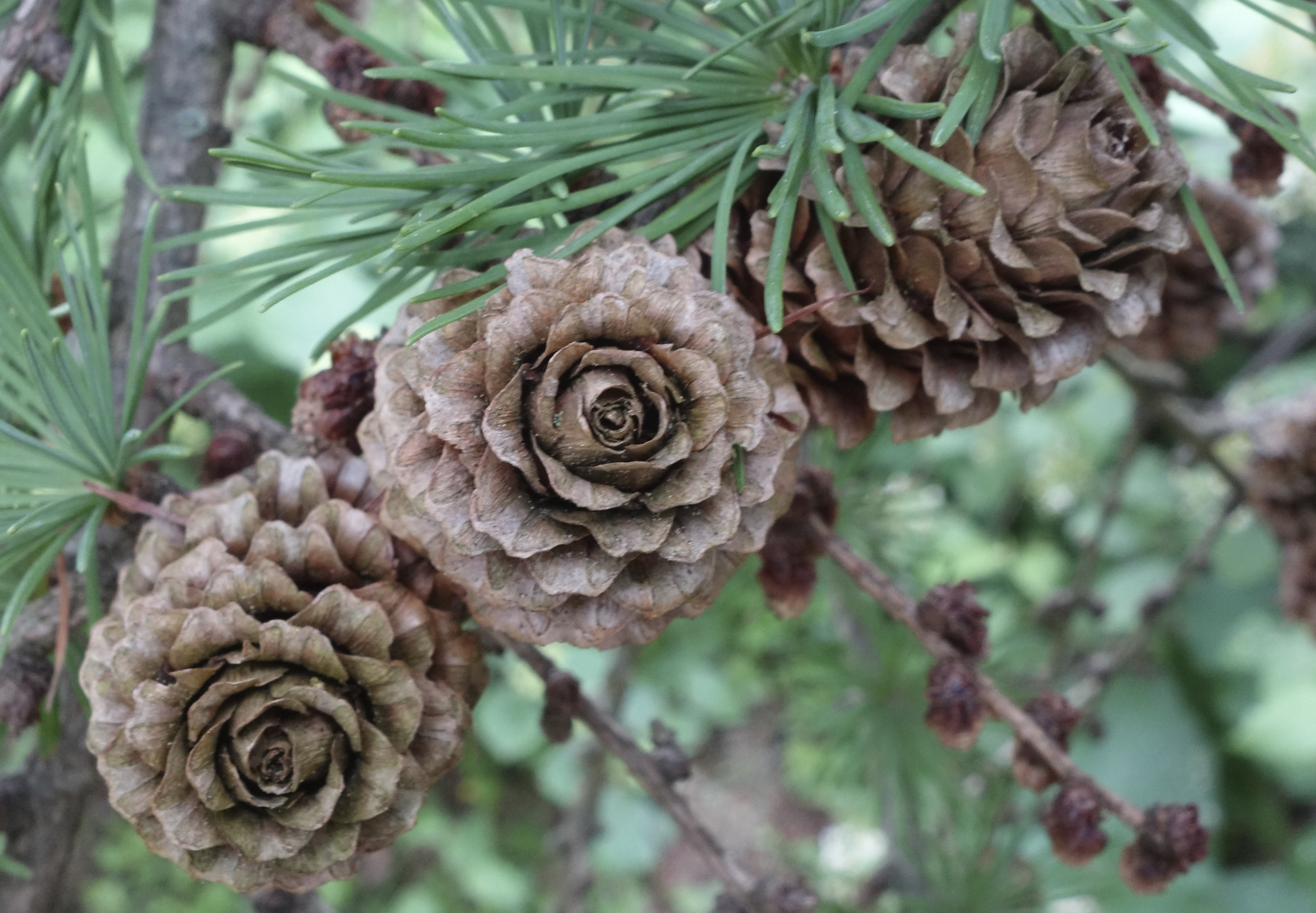
Old seed cones
