= Pseudoperonospora =

Scientific classification
- Domain: Eukaryota
- Clade: Sar
- Clade: Stramenopiles
- Phylum: Oomycota
- Class: Peronosporomycetes
- Order: Peronosporales
- Family: Peronosporaceae
- Genus: Pseudoperonospora; Rostovzev

Species
- See text

Genus of single-celled organisms

Pseudoperonospora is a genus of water moulds which includes several species known for causing downy mildew infections on plants.

Species include:

- Pseudoperonospora cannabina - causes downy mildew on hemp
- Pseudoperonospora cubensis - causes downy mildew on cucurbits
- Pseudoperonospora humuli - causes downy mildew on hops
