= Monarthrum mali =

Scientific classification
- Domain: Eukaryota
- Kingdom: Animalia
- Phylum: Arthropoda
- Class: Insecta
- Order: Coleoptera
- Suborder: Polyphaga
- Infraorder: Cucujiformia
- Family: Curculionidae
- Genus: Monarthrum
- Species: M. mali

Binomial name
- Monarthrum mali Wood & Bright, 1992

Species of beetle

Monarthrum mali, the apple wood stainer, is a species of typical bark beetle in the family Curculionidae.
