= Pythium ultimum var. ultimum =

Scientific classification
- Domain: Eukaryota
- Clade: Sar
- Clade: Stramenopiles
- Phylum: Oomycota
- Class: Peronosporomycetes
- Order: Peronosporales
- Family: Pythiaceae
- Genus: Pythium
- Species: P. ultimum Trow (1901)
- Variety: P. u. var. ultimum

Trinomial name
- Pythium ultimum var. ultimum

Variety of plant pathogen

Pythium ultimum var. ultimum is a plant pathogen infecting potato and bok choy.
