= Pseudoperonospora cannabina =

Scientific classification
- Domain: Eukaryota
- Clade: Sar
- Clade: Stramenopiles
- Phylum: Oomycota
- Class: Peronosporomycetes
- Order: Peronosporales
- Family: Peronosporaceae
- Genus: Pseudoperonospora
- Species: P. cannabina

Binomial name
- Pseudoperonospora cannabina (G.H. Otth) Curzi, (1926)

Synonyms
- Peronoplasmopara cannabina (G.H. Otth) Peglion; Peronospora cannabina G.H. Otth, (1869)

Species of single-celled organism

Pseudoperonospora cannabina is a plant pathogen that causes downy mildew, which is a fungal-like disease caused by an oomycete.

== Host and symptoms ==
The host of this disease is hemp (Cannabis sativa). The disease has been observed in Europe and parts of Asia, and on wild hemp in Illinois, suggesting that it has spread to the Western hemisphere. The symptoms that correspond with this disease include discoloration of the leaves, irregular leaf shape and death of the leaves. The leaves will begin to turn yellow, and eventually the entire plant can die. A way to diagnose this disease is to look at the underside of the leaves. The fungus grows through the top side of the leaf and makes its fruiting body on the underside. The fruiting body is where sporangia are produced, and from the sporangia, zoospores are released, which are the infectious stage of this disease cycle.

== Environment ==
Downy mildew of hemp requires cool, moist weather in order to produce spores. Usually these are the temperatures either during early spring or late fall, when it is typically cooler than 65 °F, and when the humidity is near 100%. The spores are produced by the sporangia, which emerge on the underside of the leaves of the infected plant. The sporangia pop open to release the zoospores, which require water in order to swim and infect a plant. The spores can also be transported by the wind, rain, insects, and even by people. At the end of the growing season, the pathogen overwinters by oospores that can be found in the soil or on plant debris.

== Management ==
There are many ways to help manage and control this disease. One of the biggest things that growers can do is being consistent with cleaning their gardening supplies. However, this means cleaning tools after tending to each plant. Also, simple practices such as a shoe washing station at the entrance of every greenhouse can help minimize the risk of spreading the disease to multiple growing areas. Crop rotation is also a beneficial cultural practice that can be done in order to reduce the spread of this disease. Proper spacing between plants is also important. When the plants are very close together, they trap moisture under their canopies and can be in contact with each other. Preventing the plants from touching each other can help cut down on the spread of Pseudoperonospora. If the disease has become aggressive, it may be in the grower's best option to spray for the downy mildew. Products such as copper fungicide can be effective. However, it is important to ensure that the undersides of the leaves are sprayed well with the fungicide. The underside is where the fruiting bodies that produce the infectious spores are located, and this is the part of the disease cycle that may be targeted for disease control. As an extra precautionary measure, a grower can choose to have their soil either heat-sterilized or pasteurized. This process heats the soil to very high temperatures, with intentions to destroy the overwintering oospores which would otherwise restart the disease cycle in the spring. This practice of soil sterilization can be very costly, and may not complete eradicate all of the resting spores. However, if the problem is extreme enough, it may be one of the last options left, asides from finding a new plot of land.
