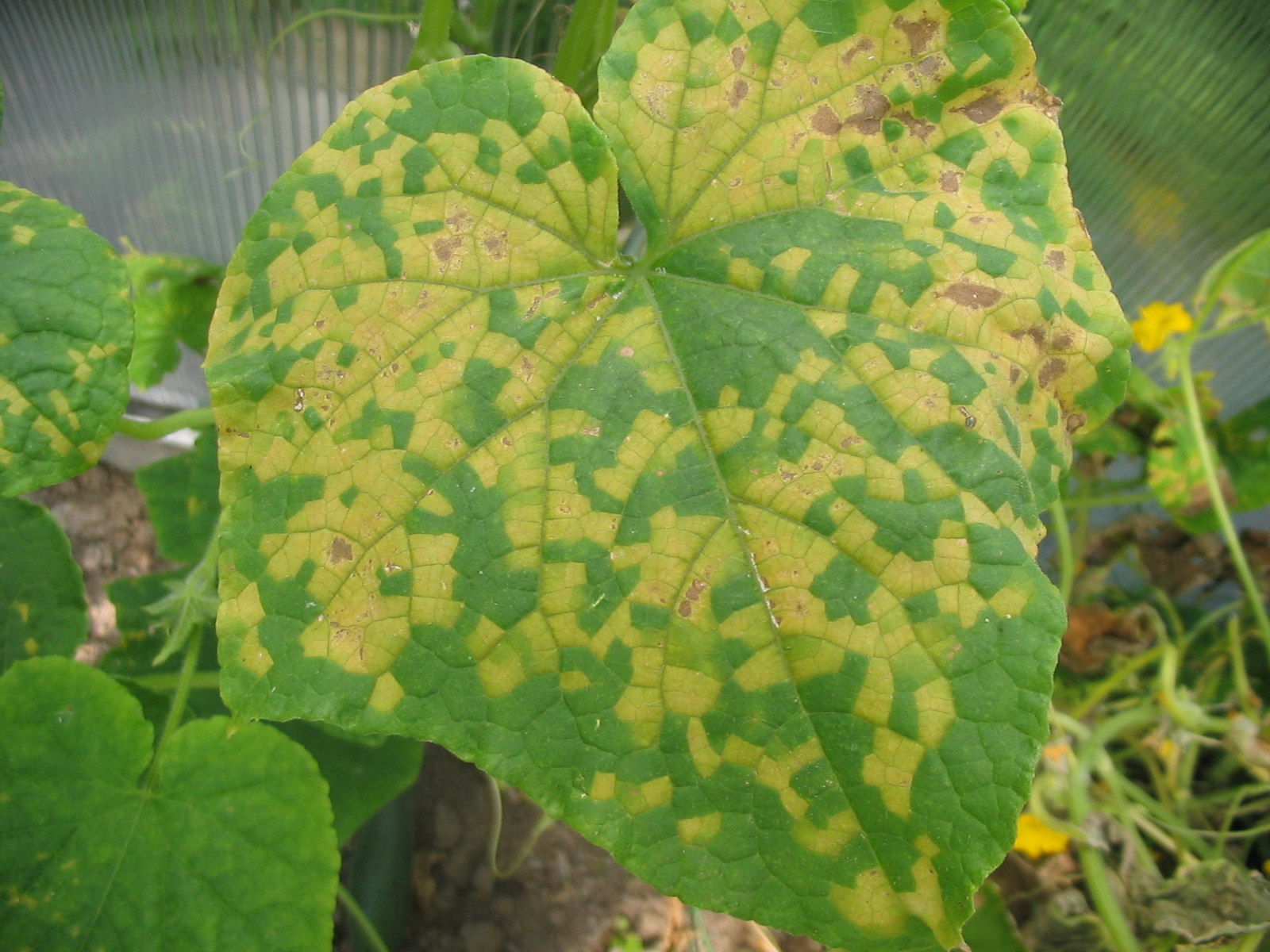
- P. cubensis on cucumber leaf

Scientific classification
- Domain: Eukaryota
- Clade: Sar
- Clade: Stramenopiles
- Phylum: Oomycota
- Class: Peronosporomycetes
- Order: Peronosporales
- Family: Peronosporaceae
- Genus: Pseudoperonospora
- Species: P. cubensis

Binomial name
- Pseudoperonospora cubensis (Berk. & M.A. Curtis) Rostovzev

= Pseudoperonospora cubensis =

Species of single-celled organism

Pseudoperonospora cubensis is a species of water mould known for causing downy mildew on cucurbits such as cantaloupe, cucumber, pumpkin, squash and watermelon. This water mould is an important pathogen of all these crops, especially in areas with high humidity and rainfall, such as the eastern United States. In most years the disease is an annual, late-season problem on squash and pumpkin in the eastern and central United States, however, since 2004 it has become one of the most important diseases in cucumber production. Considered a highly destructive foliar disease of cucurbits, successful breeding in the mid-twentieth century provided adequate control of downy mildew in cucumber without the use of fungicides. The resurgence in virulence has caused growers great concern and substantial economic losses, while downy mildew in other cucurbit crops continues to be a yearly hindrance.

== Symptoms and signs ==
The pathogen causes angular chlorotic lesions on the foliage. These lesions appear angular because they are bound by leaf veins. During humid conditions, inspection of the underside of the leaf reveals gray-brown to purplish-black fungal growth. This downy material is the sporulation of the pathogen. Magnification of the sporulation reveals the acutely and dichotomously branched sporangiophores bearing lemon-shaped sporangia. Eventually, leaves will turn necrotic and curl upwards. The disease is sometimes called wildfire because of how rapidly it progresses, as if the crop were burned by fire.

Symptoms on watermelon and cantaloupe are different from on other cucurbits; leaf spots are typically not angular and turn brown to black in color. Often, an exaggerated upward leaf-curling will occur. Regardless of which cucurbit is involved, only the leaves are infected, not fruit, flowers, stems or roots. Disease of the leaves results in three major effects: 1. reduced yields, 2. a greater proportion of misshapen fruit, especially in cucumber, and 3. sunscalded fruit, due to increased exposure to direct sunlight, especially in watermelon and winter squash.

== Pathogen biology ==
Pseudoperonospora cubensis is an obligate parasite or biotroph, meaning that it requires live host tissue in order to survive and reproduce. Because of this characteristic, the pathogen must overwinter in an area that does not experience a hard frost, such as southern Florida, and where wild or cultivated cucurbits are present. The spores are dispersed via wind to neighboring plants and fields and often over long distances. Symptoms appear 4 to 12 days after infection. The pathogen thrives under cool and moist conditions, but can do well under a wide range of conditions. Optimum conditions for sporulation are 59 °F (15 °C) with 6 to 12 hours of moisture present, often in the form of morning dew. Even when high daytime temperatures are not favorable for the pathogen (>95 °F or >35 °C), nighttime temperatures may be very suitable. Oospores (thick-walled, resting spores) of P. cubensis are rare and their role in nature is unknown.

== Host specificity, pathotypes ==
Within the cucurbit family, P. cubensis isolates will exhibit a specific host range, that is, it will infect certain cucurbits and not others. For example, if cucumber and squash are grown side-by-side sometimes only the cucumber is diseased. When a pathogen exhibits this type of host specificity within a plant family, it is referred to as a pathotype. At least five pathotypes of P. cubensis have been described in the U.S. More recent studies in the Czech Republic have revealed more pathotypes.

== Disease management ==
Controlling downy mildew requires the use of resistant cultivars, fungicide applications and early detection.

- Resistant cultivars - Host resistance is an important tool in disease control and should be used whenever possible. Cultivars resistant to downy mildew have been developed for cucumber and cantaloupe and to a lesser extent for squash and pumpkin. Although cucumber downy mildew has been severe on resistant cultivars, these cultivars are more effective than susceptible cultivars in delaying infection.
- Chemical control - Chemical control is highly recommended because downy mildew is an aggressive and destructive disease and satisfactory control without the use of fungicides is unlikely. Both protectant and systemic products should be applied. Fungicides are most effective when applied prior to infection and reapplied at 5- to 7-day intervals. The following products have proven to be the most effective fungicides in cucumber downy mildew control in North Carolina trials conducted annually from 2004 to 2008: Presidio (fluopicolide, Valent), Ranman (cyazofamid, FMC), Previcur Flex (propamocarb, Bayer), Curzate (cymoxanil, DuPont), Tanos (famoxadone and cymoxanil, DuPont), and Gavel (zoxamide and mancozeb, Dow AgroSciences). These products should be applied in a program to prevent pathogen resistance, that is, rotated with fungicides of a different mode of action. Protectant fungicides such as chlorothalonil and mancozeb should be used as mixing partners.
- Biological control - Although many biological control products have been evaluated for their ability to control downy mildew, none have proven effective and are not recommended for use.
- Early detection & forecasting - Many growers have lost the battle against downy mildew by waiting until they could clearly see the disease before initiating sprays. Early detection of downy mildew and immediate or preventative fungicide application is imperative for the control of this disease. A forecasting system exists to assist growers in timing their fungicide applications for maximum benefit. The system tracks outbreaks of the disease and provides a forecast or risk assessment for future outbreaks.
