= Elicitin =

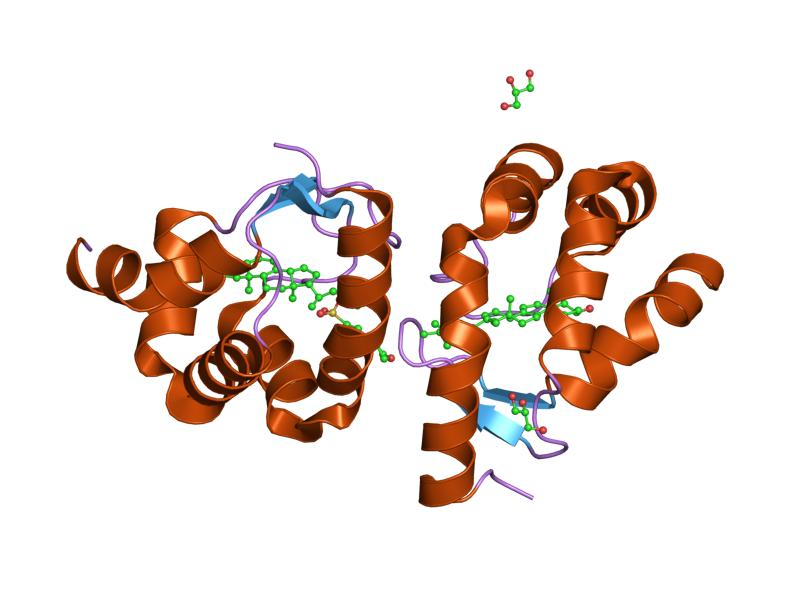
- beta-cinnamomin in complex with ergosterol

Identifiers
- Symbol: Elicitin
- Pfam: PF00964
- InterPro: IPR002200
- SCOP2: 1beo / SCOPe / SUPFAM
Available protein structures:
- PDB: IPR002200 PF00964 (ECOD; PDBsum)
- AlphaFold: IPR002200; PF00964

In molecular biology, elicitins are a family of small, highly conserved proteins secreted by phytopathogenic microorganisms belonging to the Phytophthora and Pythium species. They are toxic proteins responsible for inducing a necrotic and systemic hypersensitive response in plants from the Solanaceae and Cruciferae families. Leaf necrosis provides immediate control of fungal invasion and induces systemic acquired resistance; both responses mediate basic protection against subsequent pathogen inoculation.

Members of this family share a high level of sequence similarity, but they differ in net charge, dividing them into two classes: alpha and beta. Alpha-elicitins are highly acidic, with a valine residue at position 13, whereas beta-elicitins are basic, with a lysine at the same position. Residue 13 is known to be involved in the control of necrosis and, being exposed, is thought to be involved in ligand/receptor binding. Phenotypically, the two classes can be distinguished by their necrotic properties: beta-elicitins are 100-fold more toxic and provide better subsequent protection.
