= Monarthrum scutellare =

Scientific classification
- Kingdom: Animalia
- Phylum: Arthropoda
- Class: Insecta
- Order: Coleoptera
- Suborder: Polyphaga
- Infraorder: Cucujiformia
- Family: Curculionidae
- Genus: Monarthrum
- Species: M. scutellare

Binomial name
- Monarthrum scutellare (LeConte, 1857)

Species of beetle

Monarthrum scutellare is a species of ambrosia beetle.
