= Etridiazole =

Names
- Preferred IUPAC name 5-Ethoxy-3-(trichloromethyl)-1,2,4-thiadiazole

Identifiers
CAS Number	2593-15-9
3D model (JSmol)	Interactive image
ChEBI	CHEBI:81761
ChemSpider	16489
ECHA InfoCard	100.018.175
EC Number	219-991-8219-991-8
KEGG	C18460
MeSH	C014547
PubChem CID	17432
UNII	9F8237I875
CompTox Dashboard (EPA)	DTXSID3032547
- InChI: InChI=1S/C5H5Cl3N2OS/c1-2-11-4-9-3(10-12-4)5(6,7)8/h2H2,1H3
- SMILES: CCOC1=NC(=NS1)C(Cl)(Cl)Cl

Properties
Chemical formula	C_{5}H_{5}Cl_{3}N_{2}OS
Molar mass	247.52 g·mol^{−1}
Appearance	Pure samples are colourless and odourless; impure samples take on a pale yellow appearance with a mild, persistent odour
Density	1.497 g cm^{−3}
Melting point	22 °C (72 °F; 295 K)
Boiling point	95 °C (203 °F; 368 K) at 1 mmHg
Solubility in water	0.117 g dm^{−3}
log P	3.37
Vapor pressure	0.011 mmHg/1.43 Pa at 25°C
Acidity (pK_{a})	2.27

Hazards
Flash point	154.5 °C (310.1 °F; 427.6 K)
- Lethal dose or concentration (LD, LC)
LD_{50} (median dose)	1028 mg/kg (rat, oral); 2000 mg/kg (mouse, oral); 779 mg/kg (rabbit, oral); 1700 mg/kg (rabbit, dermal)
- Except where otherwise noted, data are given for materials in their standard state (at 25 °C [77 °F], 100 kPa). Infobox references

Etridiazole is a fungicide and pesticide used for prevention of pythium ultimum on cotton plants.

== Synthesis ==
Etridiazole can be synthesised from acetonitrile as follows:

It can also be is produced by the reaction of trichloroacetamidine hydrochloride with trichloromethanesulfenyl chloride, and then with sodium hydroxide in ethanol.

== Reactivity ==
Etridiazole is stable under normal conditions, but degrades upon continuous exposure to sunlight, and is hydrolysed by alkalis. When heated to decomposition, it emits toxic fumes of hydrogen chloride, sulfur oxides, and nitrogen oxides.

== Safety ==
Etridiazole has been classified as a Group B2 Probable Human Carcinogen.
