= Dimethomorph =

Names
- IUPAC name 3-(4-chlorophenyl)-3-(3,4-dimethoxyphenyl)-1-morpholin-4-ylprop-2-en-1-one

Identifiers
| CAS Number | 110488-70-5 |
| 3D model (JSmol) | Interactive image |
| ChEBI | CHEBI:81848 |
| ChEMBL | ChEMBL1870371 |
| ChemSpider | 4735560 |
| ECHA InfoCard | 100.100.586 |
| EC Number | 404-200-2 |
| KEGG | C18583 |
| PubChem CID | 5889665 |
| UNII | 3EXL2158GV |
| CompTox Dashboard (EPA) | DTXSID7034545 |
- InChI: InChI=1S/C21H22ClNO4/c1-25-19-8-5-16(13-20(19)26-2)18(15-3-6-17(22)7-4-15)14-21(24)23-9-11-27-12-10-23/h3-8,13-14H,9-12H2,1-2H3/b18-14+ Key: QNBTYORWCCMPQP-NBVRZTHBSA-N
- SMILES: O=C(\C=C(/c1ccc(Cl)cc1)c2ccc(OC)c(OC)c2)N3CCOCC3

Properties
| Chemical formula | C_{21}H_{22}ClNO_{4} |
| Molar mass | 387.86 g·mol^{−1} |
| Melting point | 137.2 °C (279.0 °F; 410.3 K) |
- Except where otherwise noted, data are given for materials in their standard state (at 25 °C [77 °F], 100 kPa). Infobox references

Dimethomorph is a fungicide with systemic function. It is used for treating mildew and root rot caused by fungi such as those in the genera Pythium and Phytophthora.

== Prohibition in the European Union ==
In April 2024, the European Union did not renew its approval for the use of dimethomorph, after the European Food Safety Authority identified several areas of concern. In particular, dimethomorph has been classified as toxic to reproduction.
