= Propamocarb =

Names
- Preferred IUPAC name Propyl [3-(dimethylamino)propyl]carbamate

Identifiers
CAS Number	24579-73-5; 25606-41-1 (HCl)
3D model (JSmol)	Interactive image
ChEBI	CHEBI:82033
ChEMBL	ChEMBL1907431
ChemSpider	30114
ECHA InfoCard	100.109.082
PubChem CID	32490
UNII	8HLL7N9UWO; V39TC0925S (HCl)
CompTox Dashboard (EPA)	DTXSID1040295
- InChI: InChI=1S/C9H20N2O2/c1-4-8-13-9(12)10-6-5-7-11(2)3/h4-8H2,1-3H3,(H,10,12) Key: WZZLDXDUQPOXNW-UHFFFAOYSA-N; InChI=1/C9H20N2O2/c1-4-8-13-9(12)10-6-5-7-11(2)3/h4-8H2,1-3H3,(H,10,12) Key: WZZLDXDUQPOXNW-UHFFFAOYAA
- SMILES: O=C(OCCC)NCCCN(C)C

Properties
Chemical formula	C_{9}H_{20}N_{2}O_{2}
Molar mass	188.271 g·mol^{−1}
Density	0.957 g/cm^{3}

Hazards
- Occupational safety and health (OHS/OSH)
Main hazards	Xn
Flash point	109.1 °C (228.4 °F; 382.2 K)
- Except where otherwise noted, data are given for materials in their standard state (at 25 °C [77 °F], 100 kPa). Infobox references

Propamocarb is a systemic fungicide used for control of soil, root and leaf disease caused by oomycetes. It is used by watering or spraying. Propamocarb is absorbed and distributed through the plant's tissue.

== Use ==
Propamocarb has fungicidal activity only against oomycetes.

== Safety ==
Propamocarb has low general toxicity, and almost no teratogenicity or neurotoxicity for mammals. It is not a carcinogen nor mutagen. Propamocarb is not susceptible to formation of resistant diseases. It is fully metabolized by plants and aquatic bacteria in a few weeks, so it is not a major ecological threat. It carries the risk of skin sensitization. Oral LD_{50} is 2900 mg/kg for male rats and 2000 mg/kg for female rats.

In one study conducted on tobacco, cucumber and spinach, using propamocarb synthesized out of carbon C^{14} radionuclide, researchers stated that propamocarb is decomposed down to carbon dioxide and then incorporated into the plant's natural compounds, such as amino acids.

However according to the PPDB database is propamocarb an endocrine disruptor and poses thus a high risk to human health (https://sitem.herts.ac.uk/aeru/ppdb/en/Reports/1546.htm)
