= Leaf vegetable =

Plant leaves eaten as a vegetable

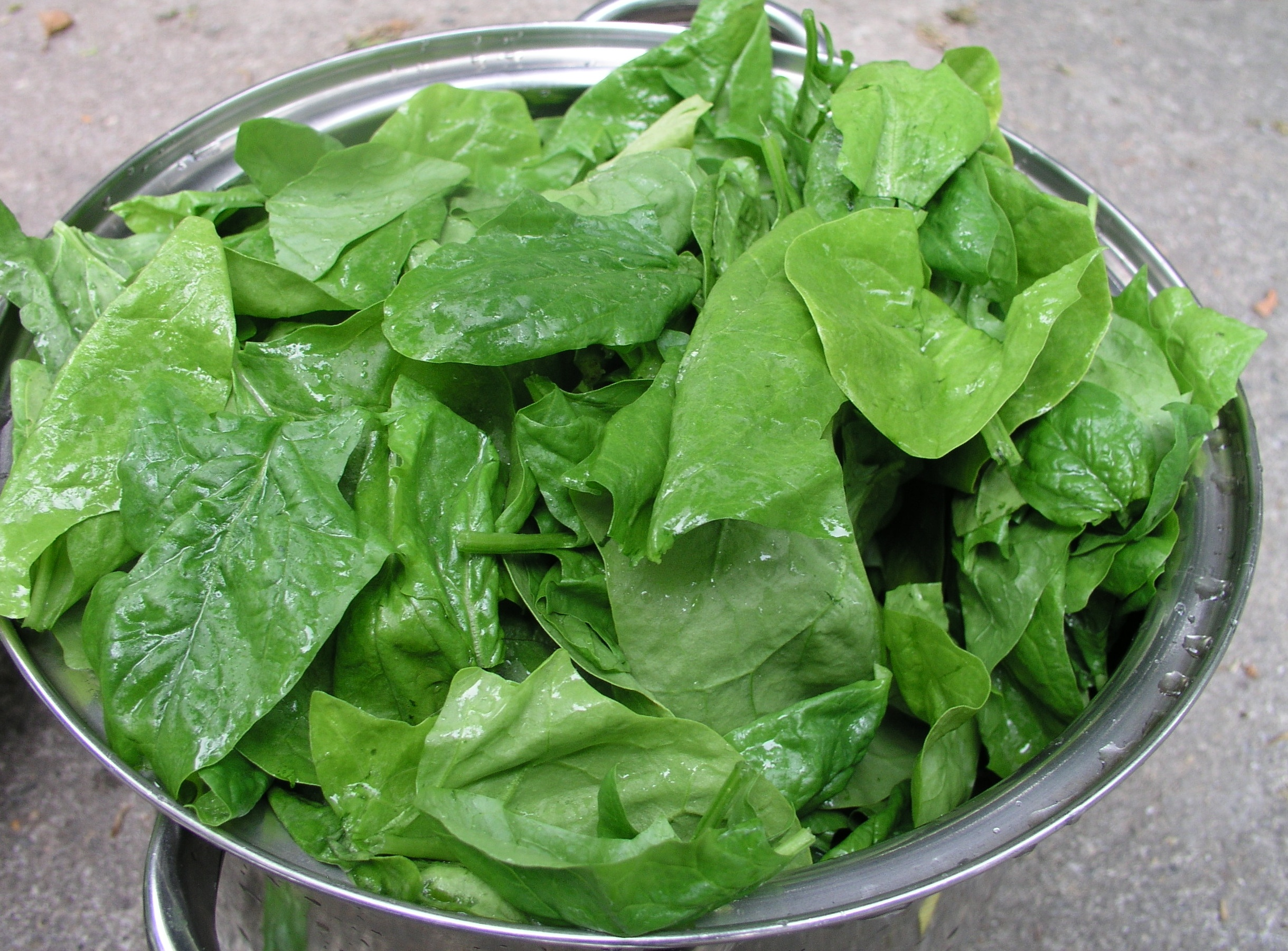
Spinach leaves in a colander

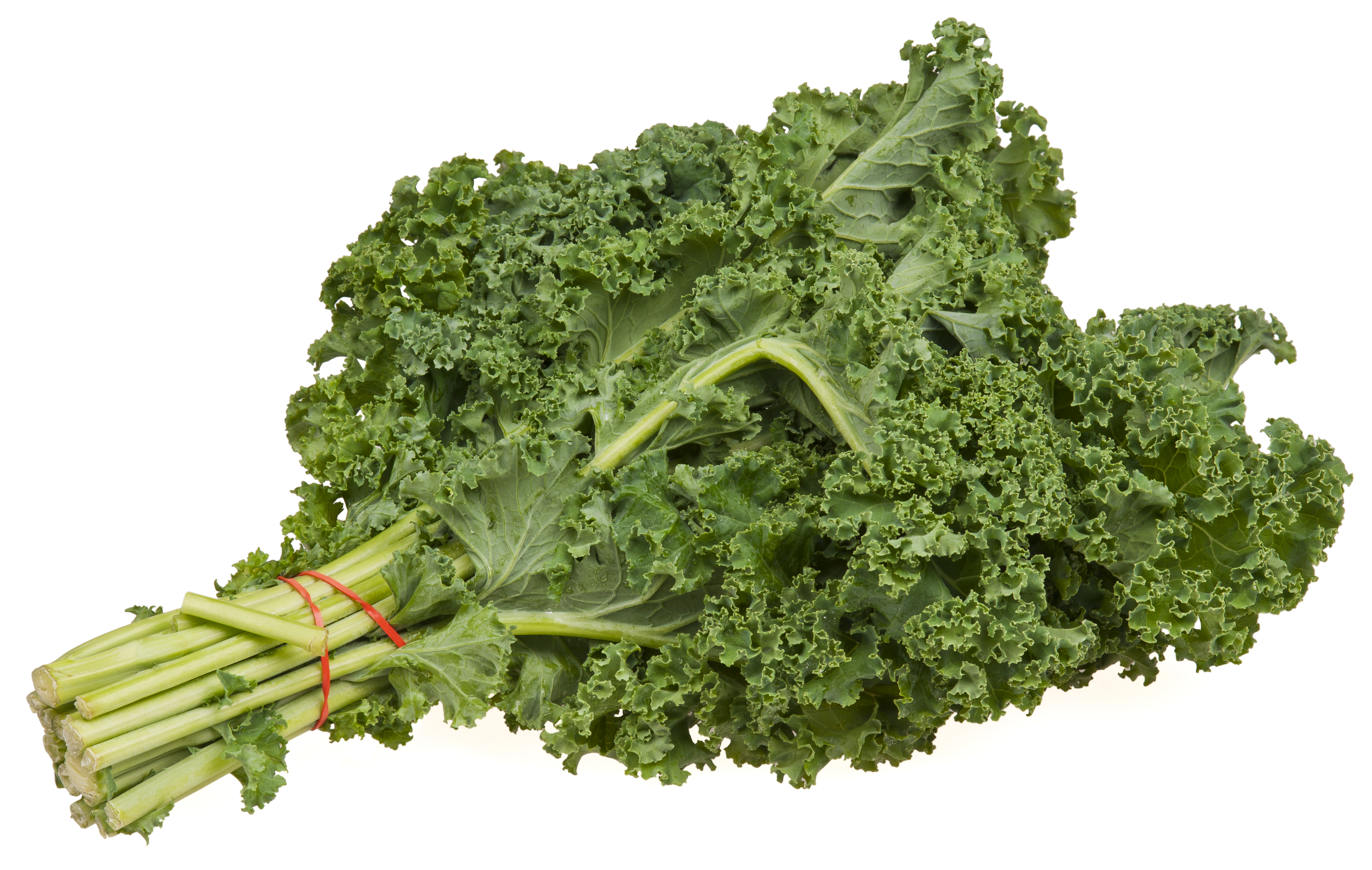
A bundle of curly-leaf kale

Leaf vegetables, also called leafy greens, vegetable greens, or simply greens, are plant leaves eaten as a vegetable. Those eaten raw in a salad can be called salad greens, whereas leaf vegetables eaten cooked can be called pot herbs.

Nearly 1,000 species of plants with edible leaves are known. Leaf vegetables most often come from short-lived herbaceous plants, such as lettuce and spinach, but also come from some woody plants. The leaves of many fodder crops (e.g. alfalfa, clover, and most grasses) are also edible by humans, but usually only as famine or processed food.

Leaf vegetables contain many typical plant nutrients, but being photosynthetic tissues, their vitamin K levels are particularly notable. Accordingly, users of vitamin K antagonist medications like warfarin must limit their consumption of leaf vegetables.

== Overview ==
Leaf vegetables are plant leaves eaten as a vegetable, sometimes accompanied by their petioles and shoots, if tender. Leaf vegetables eaten raw in a salad can be called salad greens, whereas leaf vegetables eaten cooked can be called pot herbs.

Nearly 1,000 species of plants with edible leaves are known. Leaf vegetables most often come from short-lived herbaceous plants, such as lettuce and spinach, but also come from some woody plants.

The leaves of many fodder crops are also edible by humans, but usually only as famine food. Examples include alfalfa, clover, and most grasses, including wheat and barley. Food processing, such as drying and grinding into powder or pulping and pressing for juice, may involve these crop leaves in a diet.

== List of leaf vegetables ==
- Agastache foeniculum — anise hyssop (western North America)
- Allium fistulosum — Welsh onion (East Asia)
- Alternanthera sissoo — sissoo spinach (Brazil)
- Basella alba — Malabar spinach (India, Southeast Asia, New Guinea)
- Beta vulgaris — beets, including beet greens, Swiss chard
- Brassica oleracea — wild cabbage, including cabbage, gai lan, Jersey cabbage, kale, red cabbage, savoy cabbage, collard greens, mustard greens, kohlrabi and more
- Brassica rapa — field mustard, including napa cabbage, bok choy, bomdong, choy sum, komatsuna, rapini, tatsoi, radish greens, and more
- Campanula versicolor — various-colored bellflower (southeastern Italy to the Balkans)
- Chenopodium quinoa — quinoa (western Andes of South America)
- Cichorium endivia — endive, including escarole
- Cichorium intybus — chicory (Europe)
- Claytonia perfoliata — palsingat (western North America)
- Cnidoscolus aconitifolius — chaya (Yucatán Peninsula of Mexico)
- Daucus carota subsp. sativus — carrot (Europe and Southwestern Asia)
- Eruca sativa — arugula or rocket (Mediterranean region)
- Foeniculum vulgare — fennel (southern Europe)
- Gynura bicolor — edible gynura (China, Thailand, Myanmar)
- Gynura procumbens — longevity spinach (China, Southeast Asia, and Africa)
- Hemerocallis fulva — orange day-lily (China or Japan)
- Lepidium meyenii — maca (Andes)
- Lactuca sativa — lettuce, including celtuce, iceberg lettuce, red leaf lettuce, romaine lettuce
- Nasturtium officinale — watercress (Europe and Asia)
- Malva moschata — musk mallow (Europe and southwestern Asia)
- Moringa oleifera — moringa (Indian subcontinent)
- Perilla frutescens — shisho perilla (Southeast Asia and Indian highlands)
- Rumex acetosa — common sorrel (most of Europe, temperate Asia, North America, and Greenland)
- Sassafras albidum — sassafras (eastern North America)
- Sauropus androgynus — katuk (South Asia and Southeast Asia)
- Spinacia oleracea — spinach (central and western Asia)
- Solanum aethiopicum — nakati (Asia and tropical Africa)
- Trigonella foenum-graecum — fenugreek (India)
- Tropaeolum majus — garden nasturtium (Andes)
- Viola odorata — sweet violet (Europe, northern Africa, Syria)

== Postharvest diseases ==
Postharvest diseases cause up to 50% losses of leaf vegetables. These are fungal, bacterial, and much less commonly viral. The most important remedy is temperature-controlled storage, although it is also important to prevent mechanical damage as this provides entryways for pathogens. Uncontaminated water for washing vegetables is of lesser but still significant importance.

Common bacterial pathogens include: Xanthomonas campestris pv. vitians, Pseudomonas viridiflava, P. cichorii, P. marginalis, P. marginalis, P. viridiflava, P. syringae pv. aptata, X. campestris pv. campestris, X. campestris pv. raphani, P. syringae pv. maculicola, P. syringae pv. alisalensis, Pectobacterium spp. including P. carotovorum subsp. odoriferum and P. aroidearum, and Dickeya spp.

Common fungal pathogens include: Alternaria brassicicola, A. alternata, A. arborescens, A. tenuissima, A. japonica, Colletotrichum higginsianum, Colletotrichum dematium f. spinaciae, Microdochium panattonianum, Stemphylium botryosum, Cladosporium variabile, Cercospora beticola, C. lactucae-sativae, C. brassicicola, C. acetosella, Botrytis cinerea, Golovinomyces spp., Podosphaera xanthii s.l., Erysiphe radulescui, E. heraclei, Sclerotinia sclerotiorum, and S. minor.

Common oomycete pathogens include: Albugo occidentalis, A. ipomoeae-aquaticae, A. candida, Hyaloperonospora parasitica, Bremia lactucae, Peronospora effusa, and Peronospora farinosa f.sp. betae.

Fungicides such as prochloraz can be used to manage some of these.

== Nutrition ==
Spinach, as an example of a leaf vegetable, is low in calories and fat per calorie, and high in dietary fiber, vitamin C, pro-vitamin A carotenoids, folate, manganese and vitamin K.

The vitamin K content of leaf vegetables is particularly high since these are photosynthetic tissues, and phylloquinone is involved in photosynthesis. Accordingly, users of vitamin K antagonist medications, such as warfarin, must take special care to limit the consumption of leaf vegetables.

== Preparation ==
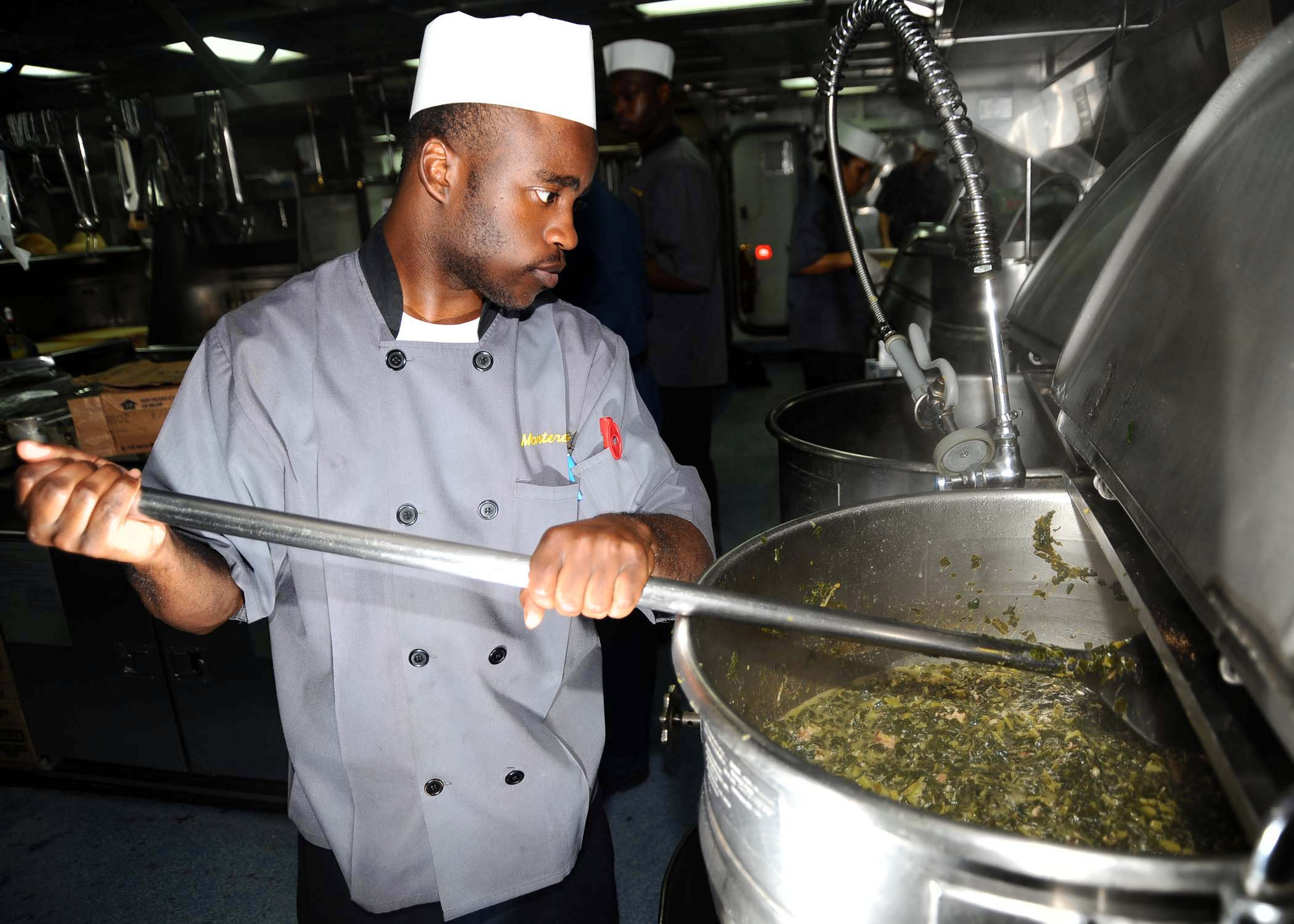
Large pot of collard greens being prepared on a US Navy ship

If leaves are cooked for food, they may be referred to in the United States as boiled greens. Leaf vegetables may be stir-fried, stewed, steamed, or consumed raw. Leaf vegetables stewed with pork is a traditional dish in soul food and Southern U.S. cuisine. They are also commonly eaten in South Asian dishes such as saag. Leafy greens can be used to wrap other ingredients into an edible package like a tortilla. Many green leafy vegetables, such as lettuce or spinach, can also be eaten raw, for example, in sandwiches or salads. A green smoothie enables large quantities of raw leafy greens to be consumed by blending the leaves with fruit and water.

=== Africa ===
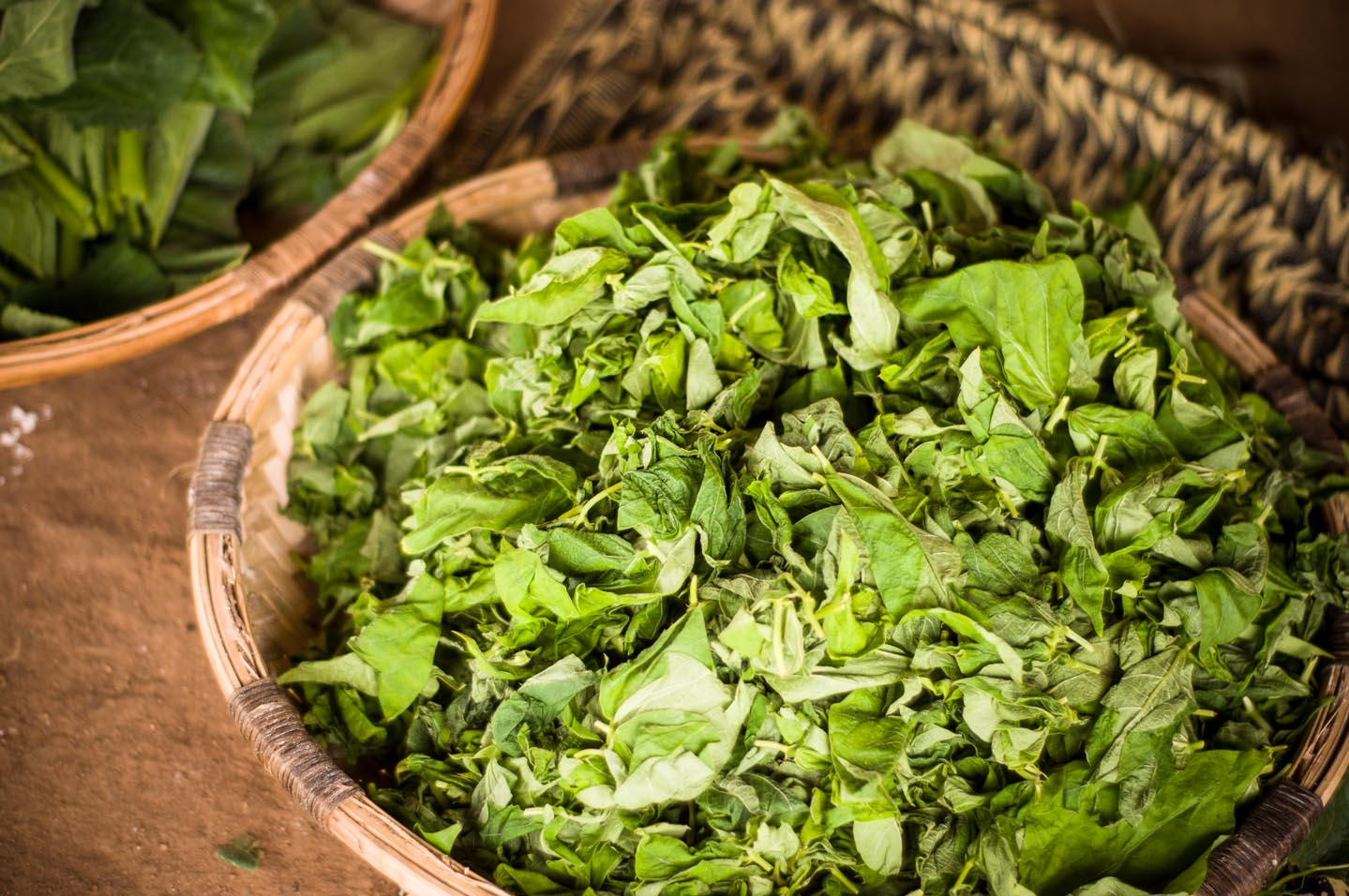
Liponda greens to be cooked and accompany ugali in east Africa

In certain countries of Africa, various species of nutritious amaranth are widely eaten boiled.

Celosia argentea var. argentea or "Lagos spinach" is one of the main boiled greens in West African cuisine.

=== Greece ===
In Greek cuisine, khorta (χόρτα, literally 'greens') are a typical side dish, eaten hot or cold and usually seasoned with olive oil and lemon.

At least 80 different kinds of greens are used, depending on the area and season, including black mustard, dandelion, wild sorrel, chicory, fennel, chard, kale, mallow, black nightshade, lamb's quarters, wild leeks, hoary mustard, charlock, smooth sow thistle and even the fresh leaves of the caper plant.

=== Italy ===
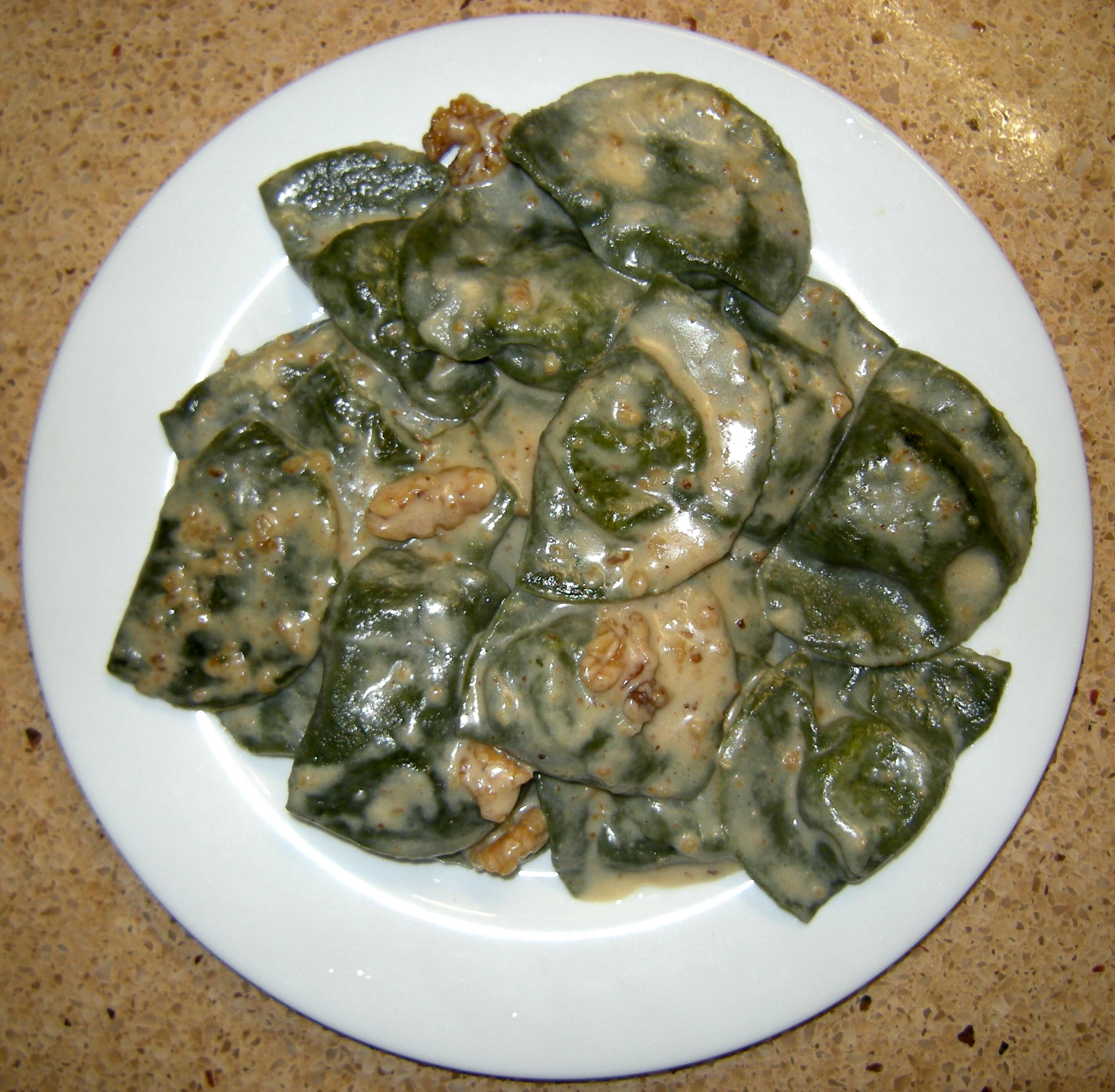
Ligurian pansoti filled with preboggion boiled greens and served with nut sauce

Preboggion, a mixture of different wild boiled leaf vegetables, is used in Ligurian cuisine to stuff ravioli and pansoti. One of the main ingredients of preboggion are borage (Borago officinalis) leaves. Preboggion is also sometimes added to minestrone soup and frittata.

=== Poland ===
Botwinka (or boćwinka) is a soup that features beet stems and leaves as one of its main ingredients. The word "botwinka" is the diminutive form of "botwina" which refers to leafy vegetables like chard and beet leaves.

=== United States ===
In the cuisine of the Southern U.S. and traditional African-American cuisine, turnip, collard, kale, garden cress, dandelion, mustard, and pokeweed greens are commonly cooked and often served with pieces of ham or bacon. The boiling water, called potlikker, is used as broth. Water in which pokeweed has been prepared contains toxins that have been removed by boiling and should be discarded.

Sauteed escarole is a primary ingredient in the Italian-American dish Utica greens.

== Gallery ==
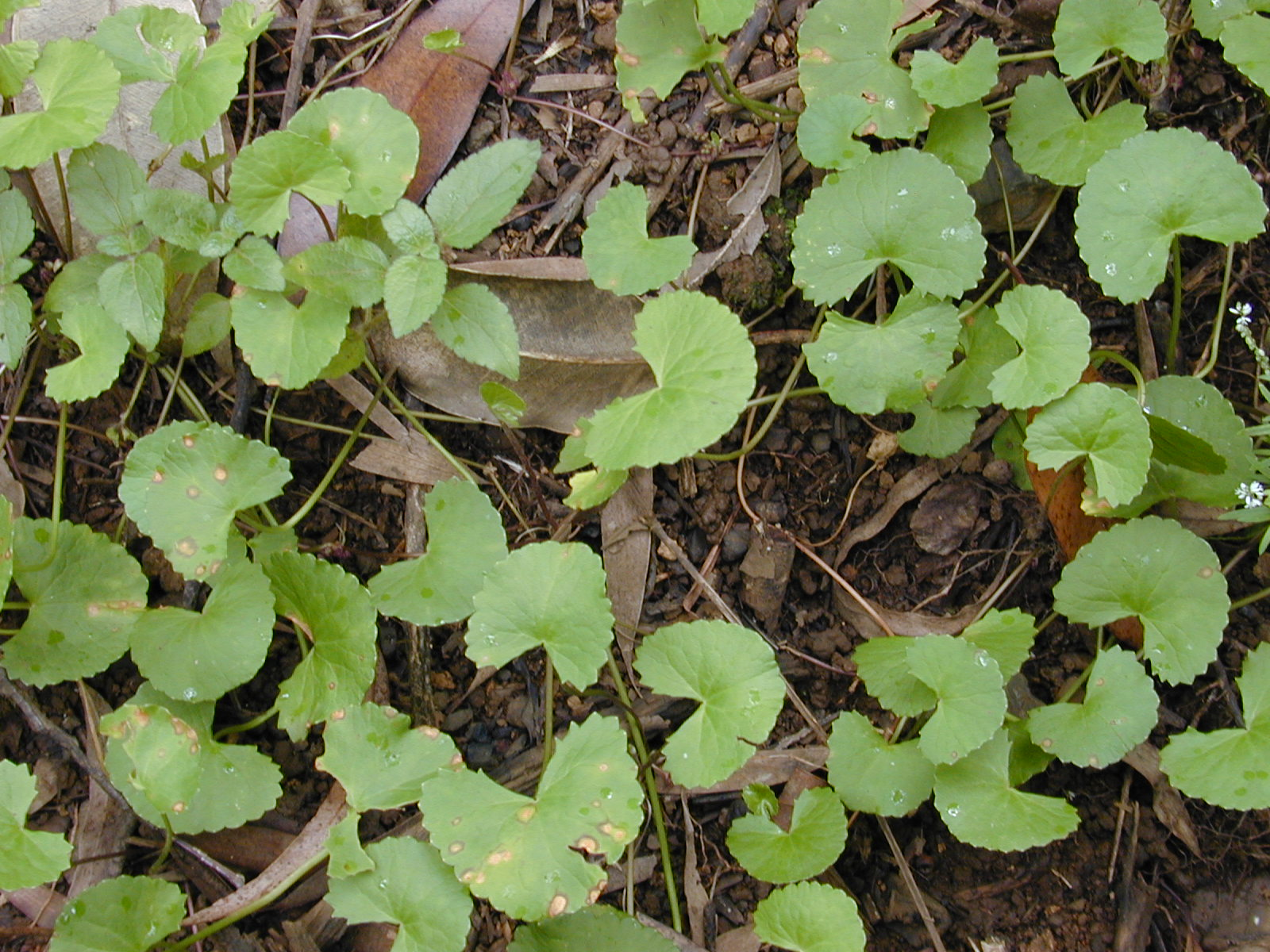
Gotukola (Centella asiatica)

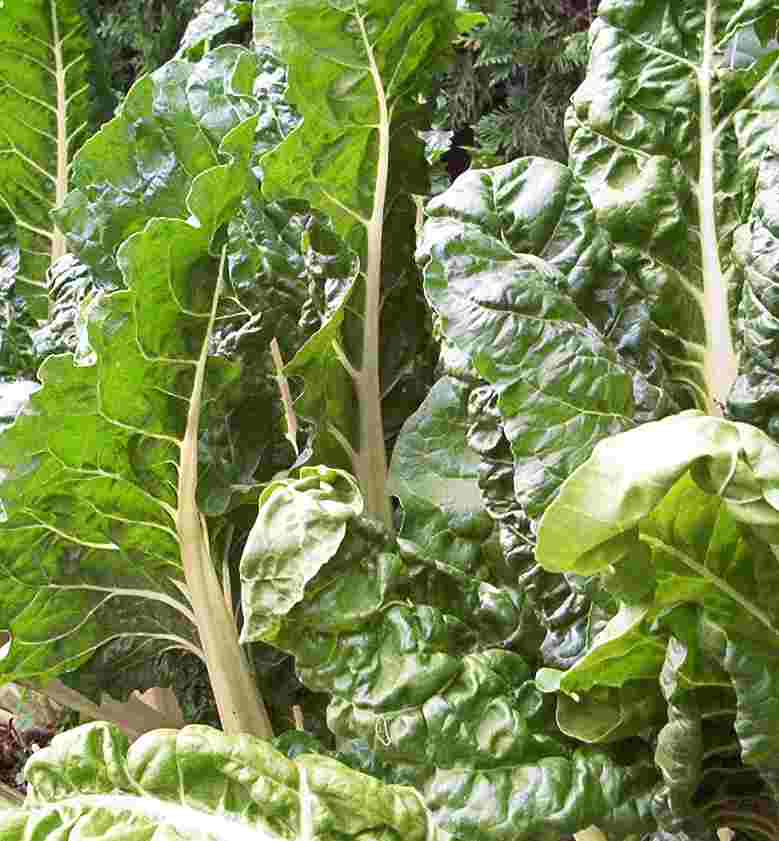
Swiss chard

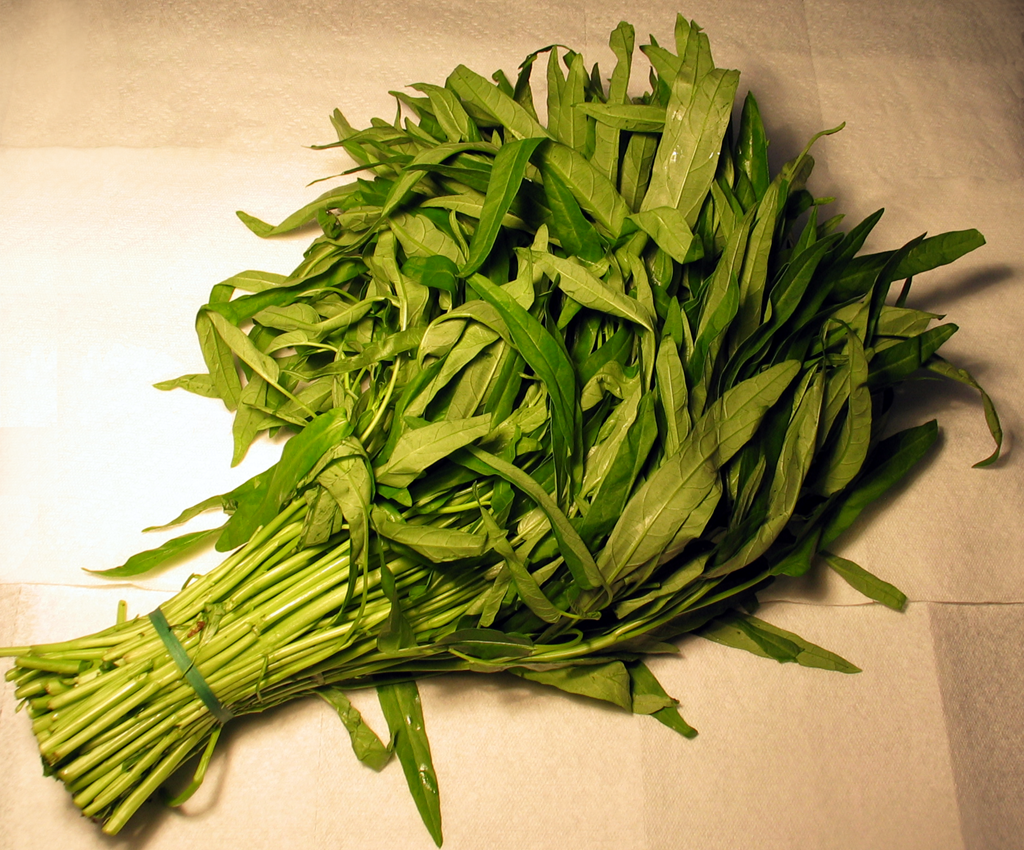
Water spinach

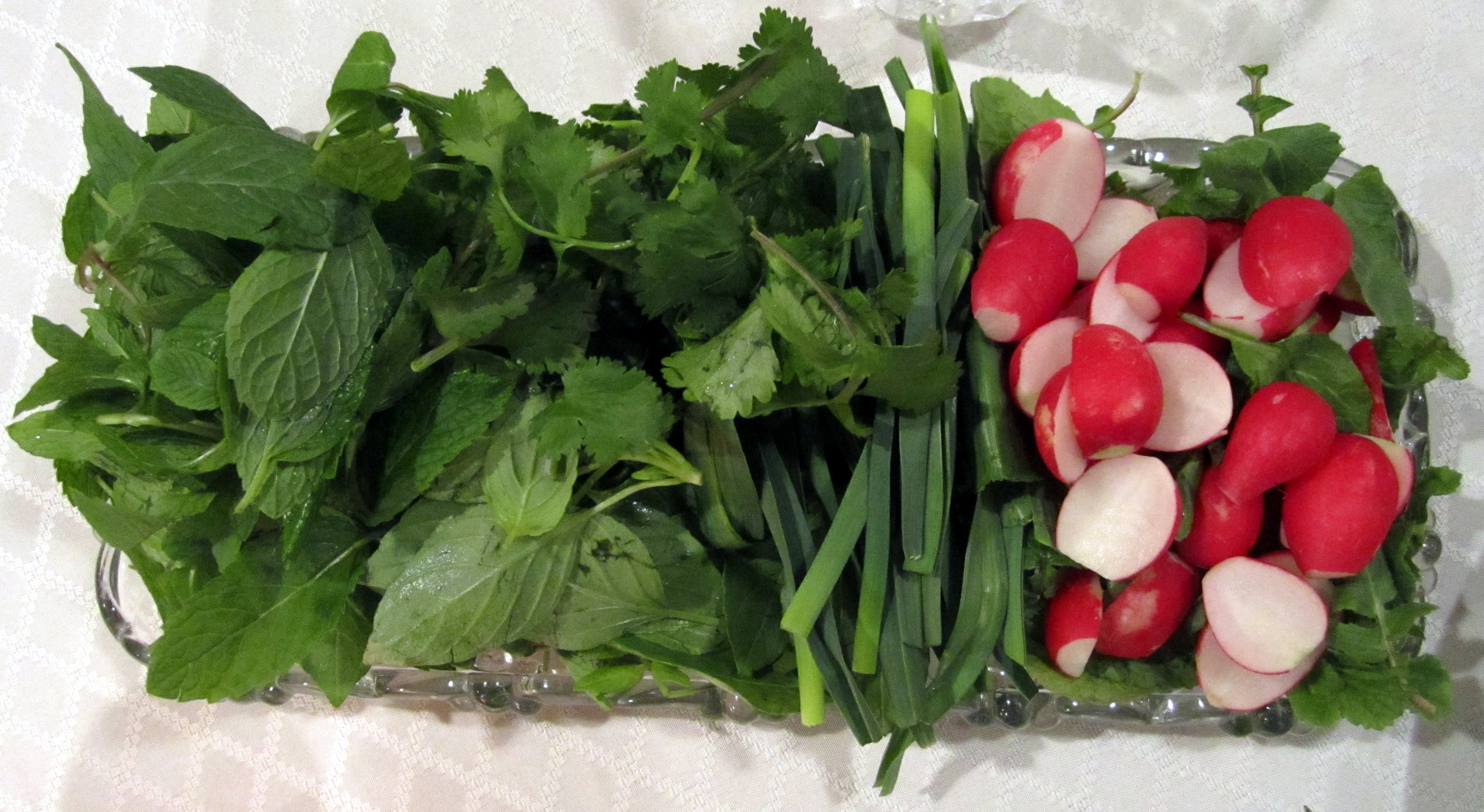
Sabzi Khordan, an Iranian salad-like dish, here of mixed greens and radishes

== See also ==
- Greens powder
- Healthy diet
- Herb
- Leaf protein concentrate
- Mesclun
- Mucheong
- Slek
- Spring greens (broad term)
