= List of lettuce diseases =

This article is a list of diseases of lettuce (Lactuca sativa).

== Bacterial diseases ==
Bacterial diseases
Bacterial leaf spot and head rot	Xanthomonas campestris pv. vitians
Bacterial soft rot	Erwinia carotovora Pseudomonas marginalis
Corky root	Rhizomonas spp. R. suberifaciens
Varnish spot	Pseudomonas cichorii

== Fungal diseases ==
Fungal diseases
Alternaria leaf spot	Alternaria sonchi
Anthracnose	Microdochium panattonianum = Marssonina panattoniana
Bottom rot	Rhizoctonia solani Thanatephorus cucumeris [teleomorph]
Cercospora leaf spot	Cercospora longissima
Damping-off, Pythium	Pythium spp. Pythium ultimum
Damping-off, Rhizoctonia	Rhizoctonia solani
Downy mildew	Bremia lactucae Plasmopara lactucae-radicis
Drop (Sclerotinia rot)	Sclerotinia sclerotiorum Sclerotinia minor
Gray mold	Botrytis cinerea Botryotinia fuckeliana [teleomorph]
Phymatotrichum root rot (cotton root rot)	Phymatotrichopsis omnivora = Phymatotrichum omnivorum
Powdery mildew	Erysiphe cichoracearum
Rust	Puccinia dioicae = Puccinia extensicola var. hieraciata
Septoria leaf spot	Septoria lactucae
Southern blight	Sclerotium rolfsii Athelia rolfsii [teleomorph]
Stemphylium leaf spot	Stemphylium botryosum Pleospora tarda [teleomorph]
Wilt and leaf blight	Pythium tracheiphilum

== Miscellaneous diseases and disorders ==
Miscellaneous diseases and disorders
Brown stain	Physiological, excess CO_{2}
Russet spotting	Physiological, excess ethylene
Tipburn	Physiological, Ca** deficiency and high temperature

== Nematodes, parasitic ==
Nematodes, parasitic
False root knot	Nacobbus aberrans
Lesion	Pratylenchus spp.
Needle	Longidorus spp.
Root-knot	Meloidogyne spp.
Spiral	Rotylenchus robustus
Stunt	Melinius brevidens Tylenchorhynchus spp.

== Phytoplasma, Viral and viroid diseases ==
Viral and viroid diseases
Big vein	Lettuce big vein virus
Calico	Alfalfa mosaic virus Tobacco ringspot virus
Lettuce dieback	Lettuce necrotic stunt virus
Internal rib necrosis	Lettuce mosaic virus
Mosaic	Lettuce mosaic virus Bidens mosaic virus Cucumber mosaic virus Turnip mosaic virus
Necrotic yellows	Lettuce necrotic yellows virus
Ring necrosis	Presumed viral agent (not identified)
Rusty brown discoloration	Accentuated by lettuce mosaic virus
Speckles	Lettuce speckles virus and beet western yellows virus
Stunt	Beet yellow stunt virus
Virescence	Aster yellows phytoplasma Beet leafhopper-transmitted virescence phytoplasma
Wilt	Broadbean wilt virus Tomato spotted wilt virus
Yellow spot	Tobacco rattle virus
Yellows	Beet western yellows virus
Other	Sowthistle yellow vein virus
