= List of mustard diseases =

This article is a list of diseases of mustard (Brassica juncea var. crispifolia and B. nigra).

== Bacterial diseases ==
Bacterial diseases
Bacterial black rot	Xanthomonas campestris pv. campestris
Bacterial soft rot	Erwinia carotovora Pseudomonas marginalis pv. marginalis
Xanthomonas leaf spot	Xanthomonas campestris pv. armoraciae

== Fungal diseases ==
Fungal diseases
Alternaria black spot	Alternaria brassicae Alternaria brassicicola Alternaria raphani
Anthracnose	Colletotrichum gloeosporioides Glomerella cingulata [teleomorph] Colletotrichum higginsianum
Black leg (leaf, root and stem rot)	Leptosphaeria maculans Phoma lingam [anamorph]
Black root	Aphanomyces raphani
Cercospora leaf spot	Cercospora brassicicola
Clubroot	Plasmodiophora brassicae
Damping-off	Fusarium spp. Rhizoctonia solani Thanatephorus cucumeris [teleomorph]
Downy mildew	Peronospora parasitica
Head rot	Rhizoctonia solani
Leaf spot	Myrothecium roridum Phyllosticta brassicae = Phyllosticta brassicina
Powdery mildew	Erysiphe polygoni
Sclerotinia stem rot	Sclerotinia sclerotiorum
Southern blight	Sclerotium rolfsii Athelia rolfsii [teleomorph]
White rust	Albugo candida (Peronospora sp. commonly present in staghead phase)
White leaf spot	Pseudocercosporella capsellae
Wirestem	Rhizoctonia solani
Yellows	Fusarium oxysporum

== Miscellaneous diseases and disorders ==
Miscellaneous diseases and disorders
Autogenic necrosis	Genetic disorder

== Nematodes, parasitic ==
Nematodes, parasitic
Root-knot	Meloidogyne spp.

== Viral diseases ==
Viral diseases
Mosaic	Cauliflower mosaic virus
Rai mosaic virus	Turnip yellow mosaic virus
