= Undecaprenyl-phosphate glucose phosphotransferase =

Class of enzymes

Identifiers
- EC no.: 2.7.8.31

Databases
- IntEnz: IntEnz view
- BRENDA: BRENDA entry
- ExPASy: NiceZyme view
- KEGG: KEGG entry
- MetaCyc: metabolic pathway
- PRIAM: profile
- PDB structures: RCSB PDB PDBe PDBsum
Search
- PMC: articles
- PubMed: articles
- NCBI: proteins

Undecaprenyl-phosphate glucose phosphotransferase (EC 2.7.8.31, GumD, undecaprenylphosphate glucosylphosphate transferase) is an enzyme with systematic name UDP-glucose:ditrans,octacis-undecaprenyl-phosphate glucose phosphotransferase. This enzyme catalyses the following chemical reaction

UDP-glucose + ditrans, octacis-undecaprenyl phosphate $\rightleftharpoons$ UMP + alpha-D-glucopyranosyl-diphospho-ditrans, octacis-undecaprenol

The enzyme is involved in biosynthesis of xanthan.
