= Carex tiogana =

Conservation status
- Critically Imperiled (NatureServe)

Scientific classification
- Kingdom: Plantae
- Clade: Tracheophytes
- Clade: Angiosperms
- Clade: Monocots
- Clade: Commelinids
- Order: Poales
- Family: Cyperaceae
- Genus: Carex
- Subgenus: Carex subg. Carex
- Section: Carex sect. Chlorostachyae
- Species: C. tiogana

Binomial name
- Carex tiogana D.W.Taylor & J.D.Mastrog.

Species of grass-like plant

Carex tiogana is a rare species of sedge known by the common name Tioga sedge.

It is endemic to California, where it is known only from the Sierra Nevada in Mono County. There are four small occurrences.

== Description ==
The Carex tiogana sedge grows in clumps of stems up to 75 mm (3.0 in) long. The narrow, rough-edged leaves are sickle-shaped. It grows in meadows and next to lakes at elevations of 3,090–3,310 m (10,140–10,860 ft).

This sedge is very similar to Carex capillaris and some authors argue it should be treated as a subtaxon of that species.
