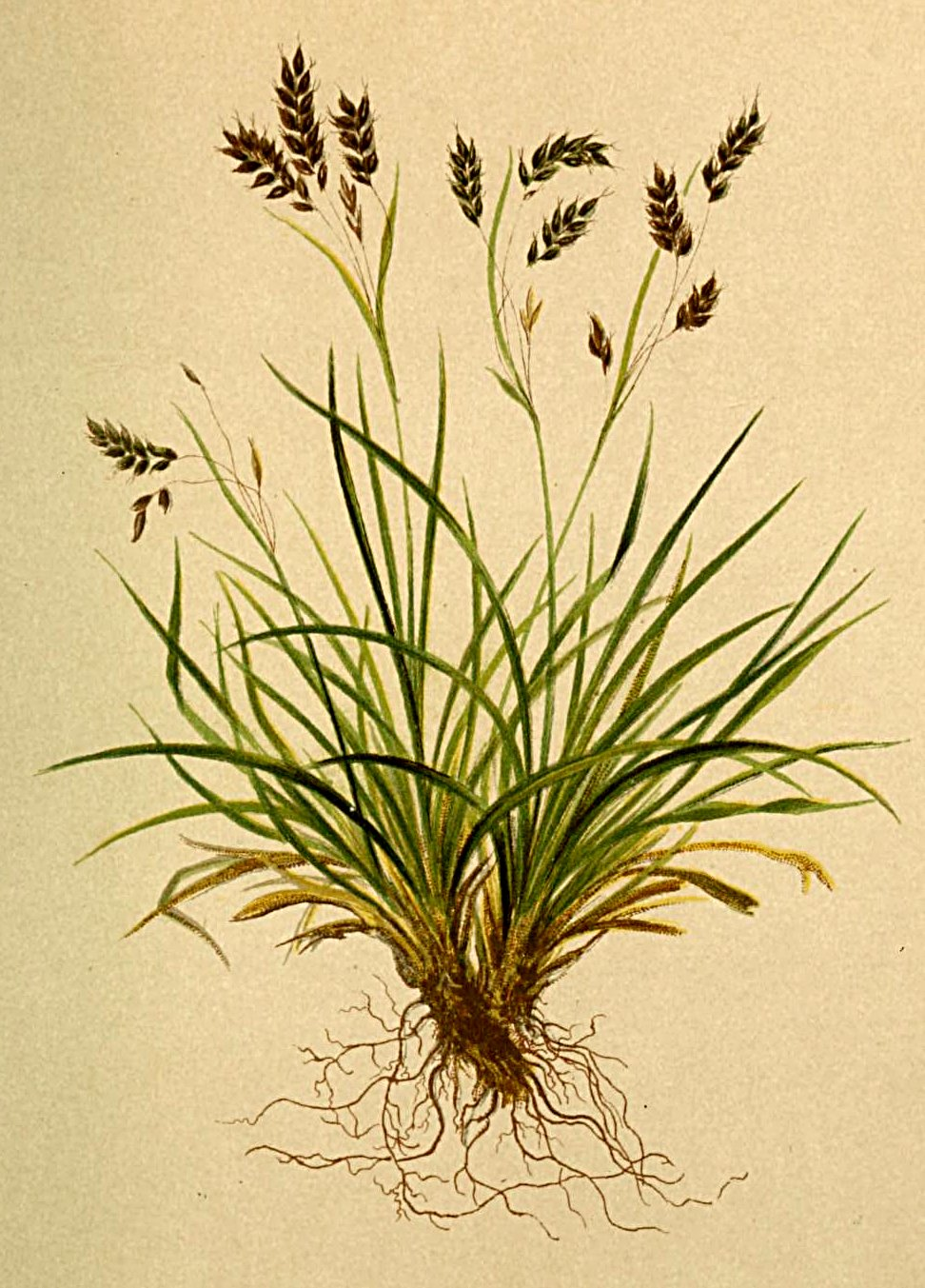

Scientific classification
- Kingdom: Plantae
- Clade: Tracheophytes
- Clade: Angiosperms
- Clade: Monocots
- Clade: Commelinids
- Order: Poales
- Family: Cyperaceae
- Genus: Carex
- Subgenus: Carex subg. Carex
- Section: Carex sect. Chlorostachyae
- Species: C. capillaris

Binomial name
- Carex capillaris L.

Synonyms
- Carex capillaris f. typica B.Boivin; Carex plena Clairv.; Loxotrema capillaris (L.) Raf.; Trasus capillaris (L.) Gray

= Carex capillaris =

Species of grass-like plant

Carex capillaris, the hair-like sedge, is a species of sedge found in North America and northern Eurasia including Greenland.

Carex tiogana, from northern California, is sometimes included in Carex capillaris. Two subspecies are accepted:

- Carex capillaris subsp. capillaris
- Carex capillaris subsp. fuscidula (V.I.Krecz. ex T.V.Egorova) Á.Löve & D.Löve

== Ecology ==
Carex capillaris is a known host to species of fungi, including Anthracoidea capillaris, Didymella proximella, Lophodermium caricinum and Puccinia dioicae.
