= Greens powder =

Vegetable dietary supplement

Greens powders are dietary supplements made up of green and leaf vegetables, as well as other plant-based products. They are generally mixed with water prior to consumption, or added to foods, including during cooking.

== Composition ==
Greens powders are made from various dehydrated powdered greens vegetables, fruits, algae, grasses, herbs and other plant-based ingredients. Ingredient labels often list pre and probiotics, antioxidants and various vitamins.

== Health claims ==
Consumption has been cited as partially making up for insufficient vegetable consumption. Greens powders have been claimed to boost immunity and reduce chronic disease risk, but research continues into the supplement's long-term effects. They generally come without recommendations from dietary experts.

== See also ==
- Aojiru
- Dietary supplement
