= Xanthomonas campestris pv. campestris =

Scientific classification
- Domain: Bacteria
- Kingdom: Pseudomonadati
- Phylum: Pseudomonadota
- Class: Gammaproteobacteria
- Order: Lysobacterales
- Family: Lysobacteraceae
- Genus: Xanthomonas
- Species: X. campestris
- Pathovar: X. c. pv. campestris

Trionomial name
- Xanthomonas campestris pv. campestris (Pammel 1895) Dowson 1939

Type strain
- NCPPB 528

Synonyms
- Xanthomonas campestris pv. aberrans (Knösel 1961) Dye; Bacillus campestris Pammel (1895); Pseudomonas campestris (Pammel) Smith (1897); Bacterium campestris (Pammel) Chester (1897); Phytomonas campestris (Pammel) Bergey (1923); Xanthomonas campestris (Pammel) Dowson (1939)

Bacterial variant causing black rot

Black rot, caused by the bacterium Xanthomonas campestris pv. campestris (Xcc), is considered the most important and most destructive disease of crucifers, infecting all cultivated varieties of brassicas worldwide. This disease was first described by botanist and entomologist Harrison Garman in Lexington, Kentucky, USA in 1889. Since then, it has been found in nearly every country in which vegetable brassicas are commercially cultivated.

Host infection by Xcc can occur at any stage of the plant life cycle. Characteristic symptoms of black rot caused by Xcc are V-shaped chlorotic to necrotic lesions extending from the leaf margins and blackening of vascular tissues.

The pathogen thrives in warm and humid climates and is rapidly disseminated in the field. Use of clean seed, crop rotation, and other cultural practices are the primary means of control of black rot. However, in developing countries such as those in South and Eastern Africa, black rot remains the greatest impediment to cabbage cultivation due to unreliable "clean" seed, multiple croppings annually, and high susceptibility of popular local cultivars to the disease.

== Hosts and symptoms ==
Members of the plant family Brassicaceae (Cruciferae), which includes cabbage, broccoli, cauliflower, kale, turnip, oilseed rape, mustard, radish, and the model organism Arabidopsis thaliana are affected by black rot.

Host infection by Xcc causes V-shaped chlorotic to necrotic foliar lesions, vascular blackening, wilting, stunted growth, and stem rot symptoms. As the pathogen proceeds from the leaf margins towards the veins, water stress and chlorotic symptoms develop due to occlusion of water-conducting vessels by bacterial exopolysaccharides and components of degraded plant cell walls. The darkening of vascular tissues following bacterial invasion gives the black rot disease its name. Lesions produced by Xcc may serve as portals of entry for other soft-rot pathogens such as Pectobacterium carotovorum (formerly Erwinia carotovora) and Pseudomonas marginalis.

These symptoms may be confused with fusarium wilt of cabbage (fusarium yellows), caused by the fungus Fusarium oxysporum f. sp. conglutinans. In contrast to black rot, in which the pathogen invades leaf margins and causes chlorotic to necrotic symptoms that progress downwards in the plant, fusarium wilt symptoms first develop in the lower portions of the plant and move upwards. Furthermore, leaf veins invaded by Xcc turn black compared to the dark brown vein discoloration found in fusarium wilt.

Symptoms of black rot may vary widely among different species of crucifers. On cauliflower, Xcc infection via stomata causes black or brown specks, scratched leaf margins, black veins, and discolored curds. Additionally, the severity of symptoms and aggressiveness of the disease varies between different strains of the Xcc pathogen. The isolates can be differentiated into races based on the reaction of several Brassica lines after inoculation. A race structure including five races (0 to 4) was first proposed in 1992; a revised classification model with six races was proposed in 2001 and, more recently, the model was expanded to include nine races.

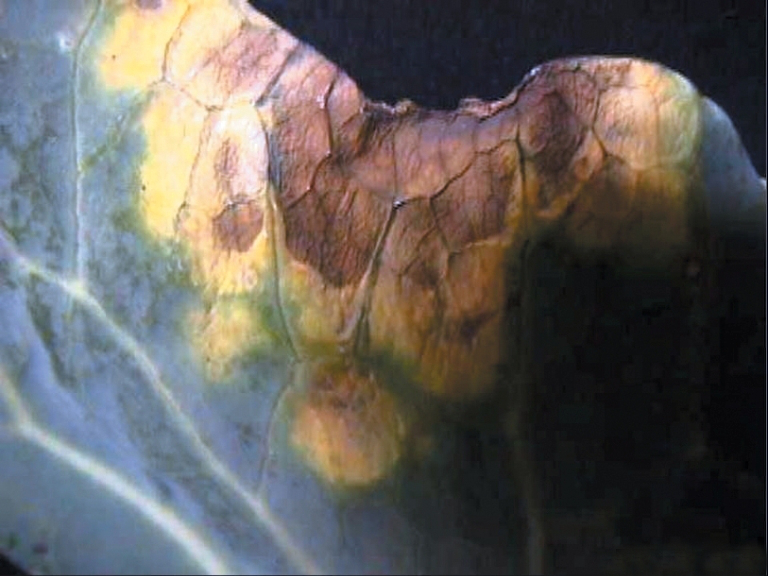
V-shaped chlorotic to necrotic lesion on cabbage leaf, symptomatic of infection by the black rot pathogen Xanthomonas campestris pv. campestris. Photo by David B. Langston, University of Georgia.

== Disease cycle ==
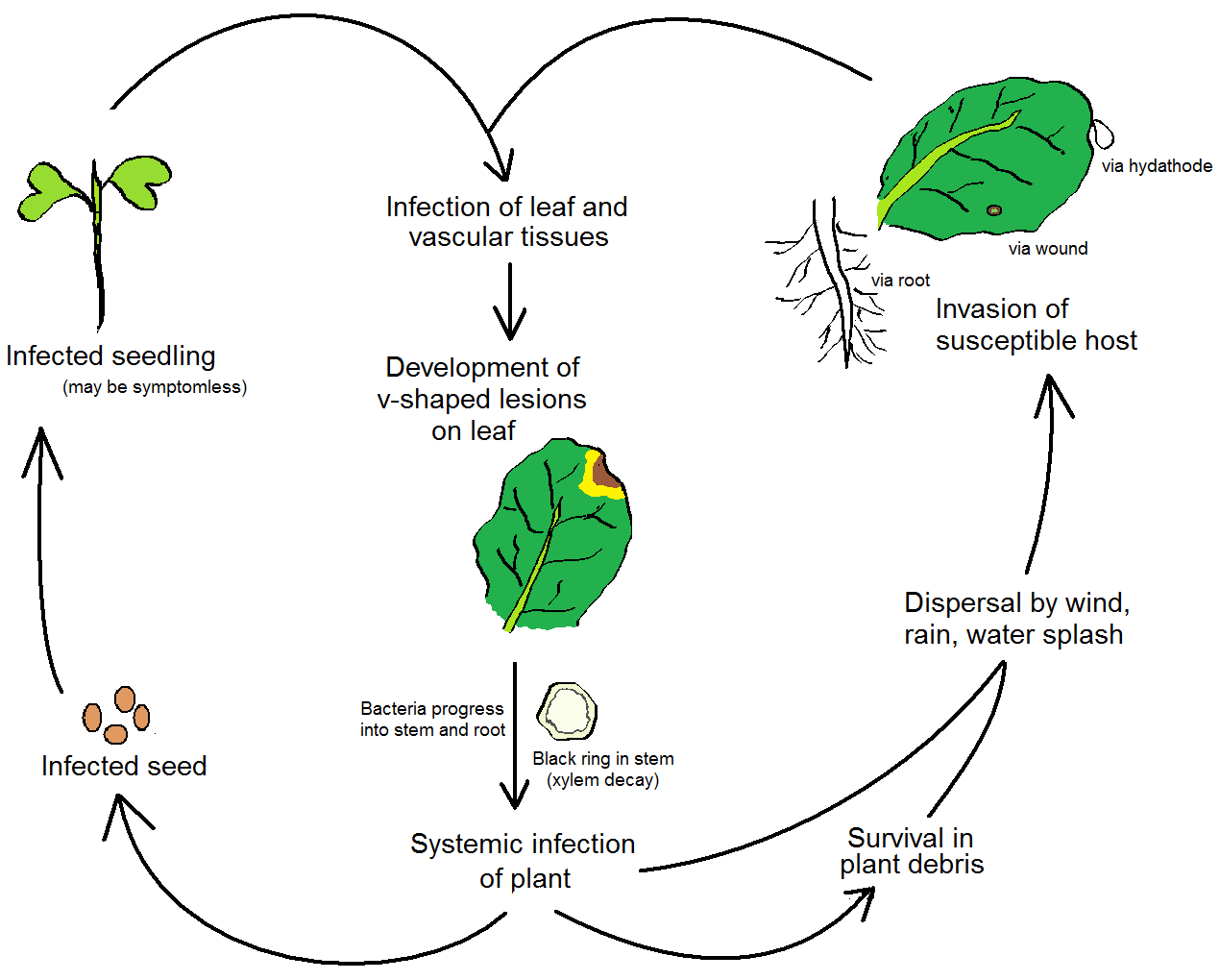
Life cycle of the black rot pathogen Xanthomonas campestris pv. campestris by G. Kwan.

The primary source of inoculum is Xcc infected seed. During germination, the seedling becomes infected through the epicotyl and cotyledons may develop blackened margins, shrivel, and drop. The bacteria progress through the vascular system to the young stems and leaves, where the disease manifests as V-shaped chlorotic to necrotic lesions extending from the leaf margins. Under humid conditions, bacteria present in guttation droplets can be spread by wind, rain, water splashes, and mechanical equipment to neighboring plants.

The natural route of invasion by Xcc is through the hydathodes, though leaf wounds caused by insects and plant roots may also be portals of entry. Occasionally, infections occur through stomata. Hydathodes provide the pathogen a direct path from the leaf margins to the plant vascular system and thus systemic host infection. Invasion of the suture vein leads to production of Xcc infected seed.

Xcc can survive in plant debris in soil for up to 2 years, but not more than 6 weeks in free soil. Bacteria present in plant debris can serve as a source of secondary inoculum.

== Environment ==
Warm and wet conditions favor plant infection by Xcc and the development of disease. Free moisture is required for host invasion, considering that the natural route of infection is through the hydathodes.

The optimum temperature range for bacterial growth and host symptom development is between 25° and 30 °C. A slower rate of growth is observed at temperatures as low as 5 °C and up to 35 °C. However, infected hosts are symptomless below 18 °C.

== Management ==
Management of black rot relies heavily on cultural practices:

- Use of certified disease-free seeds and transplants
- Hot water treatment of non-certified seeds; chemical treatments with sodium hypochlorite, hydrogen peroxide, and hot cupuric acetate or zinc sulfate may also be used
- Control of insects
- Crop rotation with non-cruciferous plants (3–4 years)
- Removal of crop debris after harvest
- Control of cruciferous weeds that may serve as reservoir for the pathogen
- Sanitation (e.g., clean equipment, avoiding work in wet fields, etc.)

The development and use of black rot resistant cultivars has long been recognised as an important method of control, but in practice has had limited success. Resistance to the most important pathogenic races of Xcc is rare in B. oleracea (e.g., cabbage, broccoli, cauliflower); the most common and potentially useful sources of black rot resistance occur in other brassica genomes including B. rapa, B. nigra, B. napus, B. carinata and B. juncea.

Resistant or tolerant cabbage cultivars are available and include:

- Atlantis
- Blueboy
- Bravo
- Bronco
- Cecile
- Defender
- Dynasty
- Gladiator
- Guardian
- Hancock
- Ramada

== Significance ==
=== Economic impact ===
Cabbage-family cultivation is a multi-billion dollar industry worldwide, reflecting its value as a vegetable crop, source of vegetable oil, component of fodder crop for livestock feed, and ingredient in condiments and spices. In 2007, the cabbage crop in the US exceed $413M (1.4M+ tons). Black rot is considered the most important disease of cabbage and other crucifers because Xcc infections may not become apparent until the warm summer months (well after planting), the pathogen spreads rapidly, and losses due to the disease may exceed 50% in warm, wet climates. The importance of using disease-free seed and/or transplants is highlighted by the fact that "as few as three infected seeds in 10,000 (0.03%) can cause black rot epidemics in a field." In transplant beds, an initial infection level of 0.5% can rise to 65% in just three weeks. In fact more recent work indicates that spread can be much more rapid than this: with overhead gantry irrigation, spread of the pathogen greatly exceeded symptom spread to the extent that in one experiment almost 100% of the transplants were infested in a block of 15 module trays (around 4500 plants) six weeks after sowing from a single primary infector. Modelling of the rate of spread in transplants indicates that the widely used tolerance standard for seed health testing (0·01%) should be revised to 0·004%.

=== Biotechnology ===
==== Xanthan ====
Xanthan is an exopolysaccharide produced by Xcc. Commercially produced xanthan is used as a thickening food additive and lubricant, amongst other industrial applications.

==== Genomics ====
The genomes of three Xcc strains—ATCC 33913, B100, and 8004—have been fully sequenced and are publicly available.
