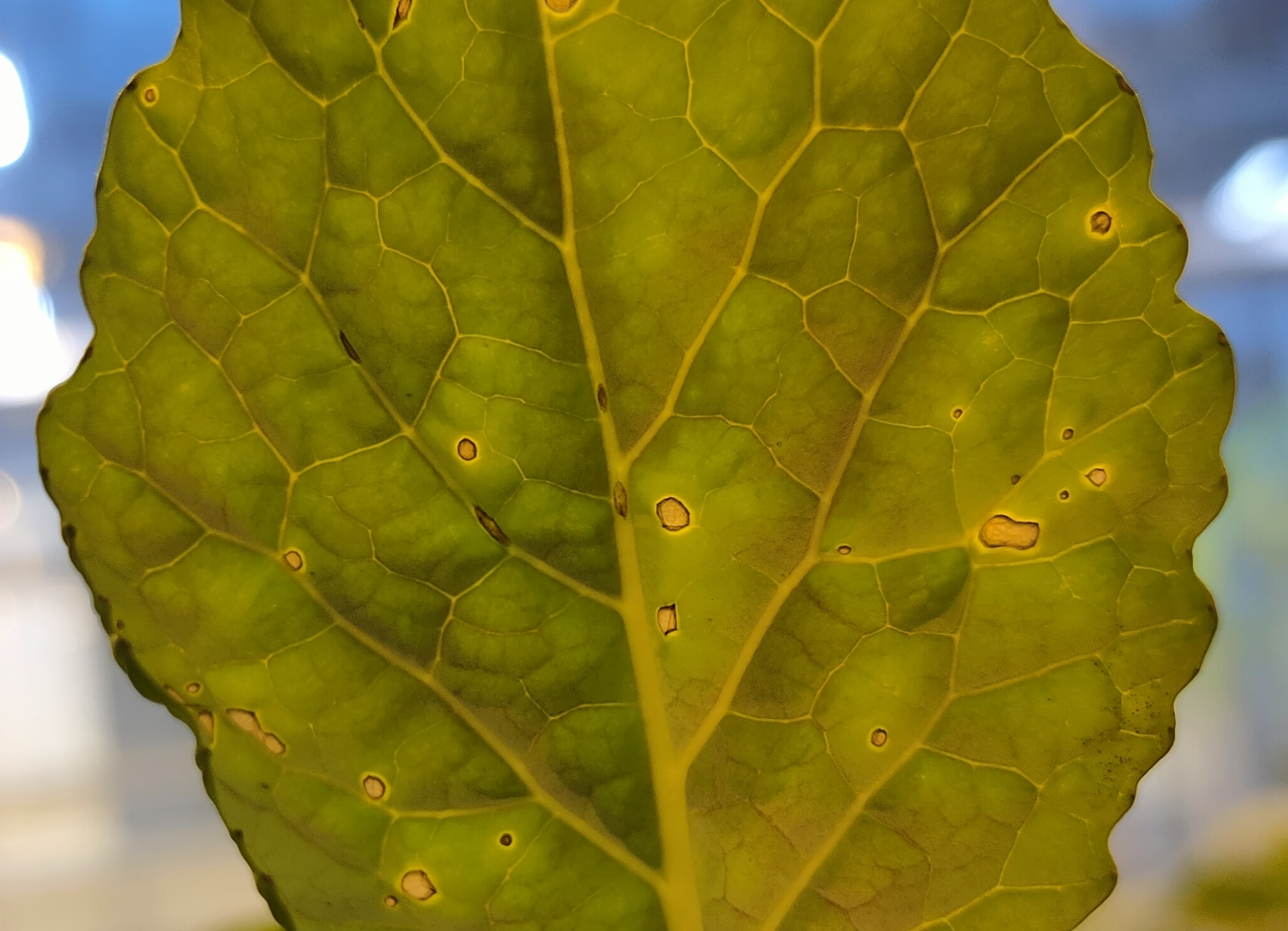

Scientific classification
- Domain: Bacteria
- Kingdom: Pseudomonadati
- Phylum: Pseudomonadota
- Class: Gammaproteobacteria
- Order: Xanthomonadales
- Family: Xanthomonadaceae
- Genus: Xanthomonas
- Species: X. campestris
- Pathovar: X. c. pv. raphani

Trionomial name
- Xanthomonas campestris pv. raphani

= Xanthomonas campestris pv. raphani =

Pathovar of bacteria

Xanthomonas campestris pv. raphani is a gram-negative, obligate aerobic bacterium that like many other Xanthomonas spp. bacteria has been found associated with plants. This organism is closely related with Xanthomonas campestris pv. campestris, but causes a non-vascular leaf spot disease that is clearly distinct from black rot of brassicas.

Leaf spot diseases of brassicas were associated with X. campestris pv. armoraciae (McCulloch) Dye or X. campestris pv. raphani (White) Dye. The leaf spot isolates most commonly found in brassicas have been identified as X. campestris pv. raphani..

== Hosts and symptoms ==
The host range of X. campestris pv. raphani is wider than X. campestris pv. campestris and includes Brassica spp., radish, ornamental crucifers like wallflowers and tomato.

Symptoms include circular dark spots that later became light brown or gray, sometimes surrounded by a water-soaked halo. In severely infections, the spots can coalesce and become irregular, but not limited by the veins. Symptoms also include black, sunken, elongated lesions on the middle vein, petiole, and/or stem.

== Significance ==
This pathovar causes a minor disease in brassica crops; it can be occasionally isolated from seeds.
