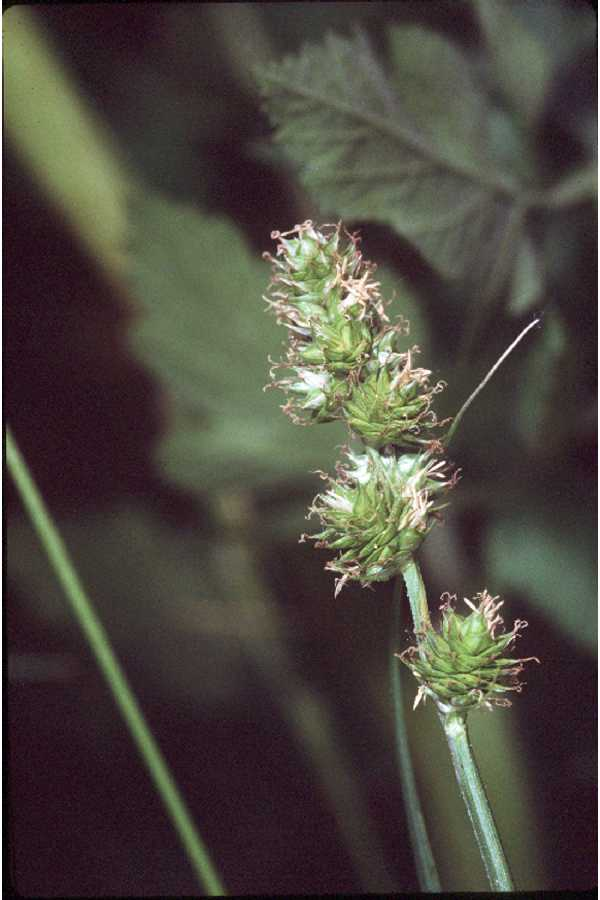

Conservation status
- Apparently Secure (NatureServe)

Scientific classification
- Kingdom: Plantae
- Clade: Tracheophytes
- Clade: Angiosperms
- Clade: Monocots
- Clade: Commelinids
- Order: Poales
- Family: Cyperaceae
- Genus: Carex
- Subgenus: Carex subg. Vignea
- Section: Carex sect. Ovales
- Species: C. molesta

Binomial name
- Carex molesta Mack. ex Bright

= Carex molesta =

Troublesome sedge

Species of grass-like plant

Carex molesta is a species of sedge known by the common name troublesome sedge. It is native to eastern and central North America, where it grows in varied wet and dry habitats, performs equally well in full sun and partial shade, including disturbed areas such as roadsides. It is an introduced species and often a weed in California.

== Description ==
This sedge produces clumps of stems up to about a meter tall, with several narrow leaves up to about 35 centimetres (14 in) long. The inflorescence is an open cluster of green spherical spikes each 0.5 to 1.5 centimetres (0.20 to 0.59 in) long. The 2 to 5 spikes are from 6 to 9 millimeters long, and all at the tip of the stem. The spikes are overlapping and usually crowded. All of the spikes are stalkless, either erect or ascending, and rounded at the tip and base. There are both male and female flowers, with the few male flowers at the base and female flowers at the tips. There are between 3 and 7 alternate leaves on the lower third of the stem. The leaves are between 1.5 and 3.8 millimeters wide and shorter than the stems. The leaves are rough around the edges, especially near the tips. The leaf sheaths tightly wrap around the stem and are mostly green near the tip. The ligule is either as wide or wider than long. The bases are wrapped in a brown sheath. Old leaves often stay to the next season. The erect stems are hairless and mostly smooth, except just below the spikes. The fruit is made in late spring to mid summer. The spikes form clusters of seeds, which are each wrapped in a perigynium. Each spike has between 25 and 80 achenes. The pistillate scales are either lance or egg-shaped. It is either whitish or brown-tinged with a green or pale midrib. The pistillate scales are between 2.9 and 3.5 millimeters long. The perigynia are between 3.3 and 5 millimeters long and between 1.8 and 3 millimeters wide. The hairless perigynia are either light green to light reddish-brown at maturity. The achenes are lens-shaped, brown at maturity, and between 1.3 and 1.7 millimeters long and between .8 and 1.3 millimeters wide.
