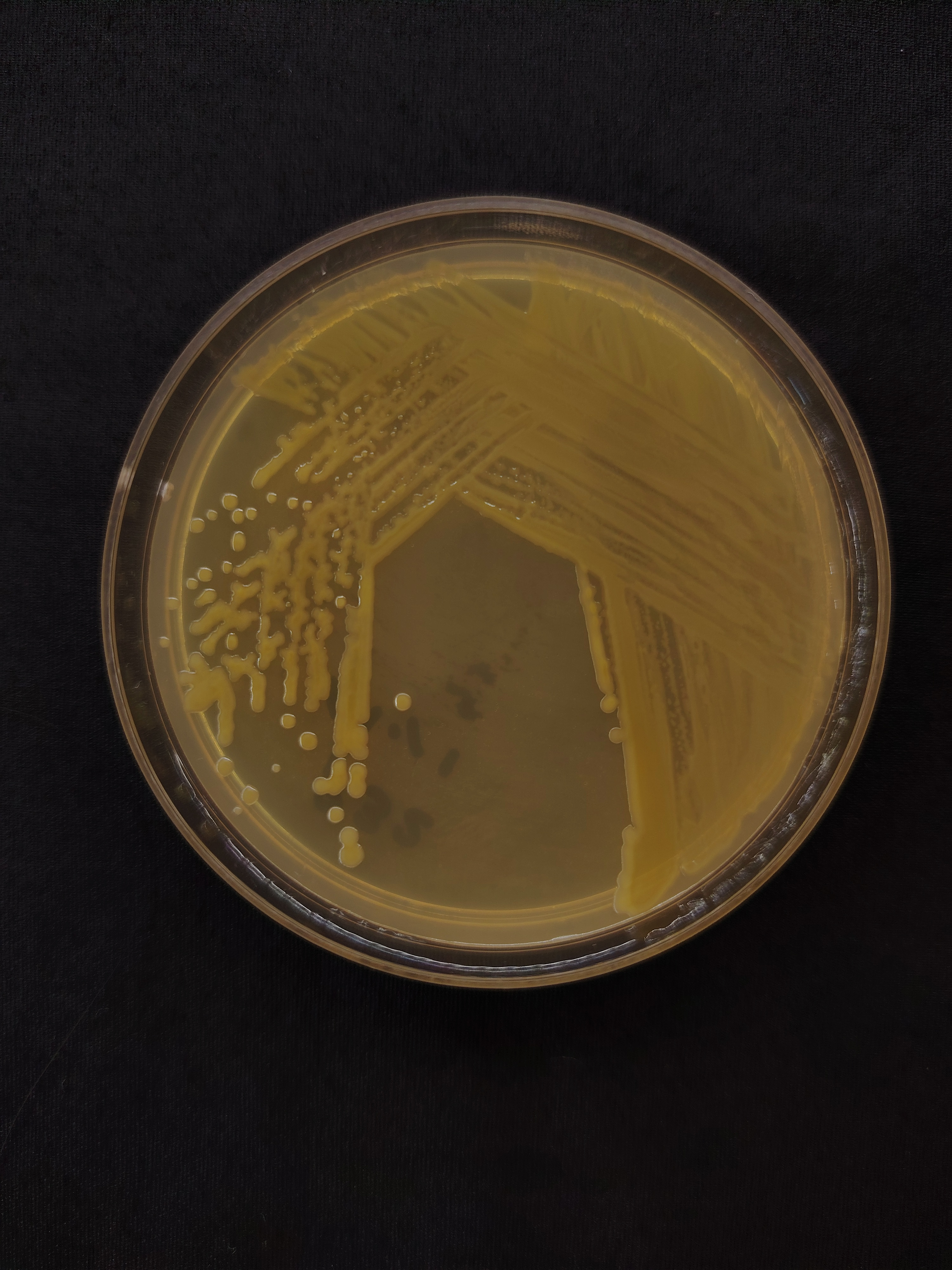
- Pseudomonas viridiflava colony on LB medium

Scientific classification
- Domain: Bacteria
- Kingdom: Pseudomonadati
- Phylum: Pseudomonadota
- Class: Gammaproteobacteria
- Order: Pseudomonadales
- Family: Pseudomonadaceae
- Genus: Pseudomonas
- Species: P. viridiflava

Binomial name
- Pseudomonas viridiflava (Burkholder 1930); Dowson 1939

Type strain
- ATCC 13223 CFBP 2107; CIP 106699; DSM 11124; ICMP 2848; LMG 2352; NCPPB 635; NRRL B-895

Pathovars
- P. v. pv. primulae P. v. pv. ribicola P. v. pv. viridiflava

Synonyms
- Phytomonas viridiflava Burkholder 1930

= Pseudomonas viridiflava =

Species of bacterium

Pseudomonas viridiflava is a fluorescent, Gram-negative, soil bacterium that is pathogenic to plants. It was originally isolated from the dwarf or runner bean, in Switzerland. Based on 16S rRNA analysis, P. viridiflava has been placed in the P. syringae group. Following ribotypical analysis misidentified strains of Pseudomonas syringae pv. ribicola (which infects Ribes aureum) and Pseudomonas syringae pv. primulae (which infects Primula species) were incorporated into this species. This pathogen causes bacterial blight of Kiwifruit.

== Host and symptoms ==
Kiwis are grown in countries such as Italy, New Zealand, China, and Chile making this bacterium a problem in kiwi-growing regions across the world. Kiwis have a long growing season from the beginning of spring to the fall which indicates that kiwis grow in warmer temperatures, but colder temperatures are important for the leaves to fall of the vine and for new buds to form in the spring. The pathogen, Pseudomonas viridiflava, was first discovered in kiwifruit in New Zealand in 1973. It has been discovered on 31 other plant species such as tomato, melon, eggplant, and blight. Symptoms on each host differ slightly, but in general, this bacterium causes a soft rot in the stem or flowering structures, not in woody tissues, which results in these structures turning brown and dying.

To continue, the symptoms of this bacterial blight include spots and lesions on leaves, and rot of floral buds and flowers. The floral symptoms undergo changes throughout the seasons that ultimately end in the floral bud dying and falling off. These symptoms are found initially as brown and sunken spots on the green sepals of the vine that enclose the flower buds. The result is the flower buds begin to rot when unopened. If the buds do open and yield a yellow-orange color, rather than white, the flower turns brown rather quickly and dies. In addition, the anthers or male sexual parts of the flower can be destroyed in this disease causing an incomplete retraction of sepals. Regarding the leaves, symptoms are visible in later spring and are found on the lower leaves first. The lesions created are angular and gray on the lower leaves, and the lesions are surrounded with a yellow halo on the upper leaves. These lesions turn brown and can be a site for a secondary infection by a fungus or some other pathogen. All of this leads to abnormal fruit development on diseased plants which can create an economic problem for the grower. Fruit development is the largest economical concern when referring to this pathogen. Yield loss can become very high, reaching over 90% in orchards that have symptoms of this pathogen. When no symptoms are present, however, the plant is healthy and fruit development is normal. It is stated that it is very rare to find normal fruit development on plants with symptoms of bacterial blight showing how detrimental this disease and pathogen is.

Furthermore, host factors have had an influence on this disease. Pseudomonas viridiflava can survive on the surface of the plant as an epiphyte, meaning it is present on leaves without disease occurring. This allows the pathogen to associate itself with the healthy kiwifruit vine by maintaining a non-pathological relationship with the host. This pathogen also utilizes its large host range to survive on other hosts when not infecting a kiwifruit vine. Lastly, the host does not do anything specifically to help this disease spread, but does not have the proper defense mechanisms to prevent the bacterium from surviving on the plant or stopping this disease from spreading throughout.

== Environment ==
The environment plays a significant role in the severity of bacterial blight according to kiwifruit based studies in New Zealand and in Italy by many different scientists and plant pathologists. First, pseudomonas viridiflava infects the kiwifruit vine buds before flowering during the spring, when warmer weather comes around. The warmer weather has been indicated in one study of disease incidence being at its highest point between 10 and 12 °C. This temperature promotes flowering and is the ideal time for bacteria to attack the plant. It has been found that the wetter, humid weather has been helpful in the development of the disease and is a favorable environment for this bacterium. Moisture and rainfall prior to flowering has been deemed a very important environmental condition for this pathogen and results in the greatest disease incidence. Years where it has been dry and lack of rain prior to the flowering period have led to less disease and lower concentration of bacteria on kiwifruit vines. In one study, conducted in New Zealand, the disease was more prevalent in a gully, especially on the outside groups of vines, where the area stayed wet for longer periods of time because they were more exposed to wet conditions and dew.

The prevalence of the bacterium has been higher in fall and spring months with warmer and wetter weather rather than during the colder winters and hotter summers. There is a decline of disease after the flowering period has begun due to the lack of nutrients on the flower itself and that the buds fall off and die. Regarding the winter months, the bacterium has been isolated in a pure culture in a lab and tested in temperature extremes to see how it overwinters and survives. It has been shown that activity and survival can occur on the surface of twigs as this bacterium survives as an epiphyte on temperatures as low as -3 °C. This allows the bacterium to survive and multiple rapidly when warmer, more humid conditions present itself in the spring.

== Management ==
One way to help manage this disease is to prevent injuries onto the kiwifruit vine that would allow the bacteria in the plant. This can be done by staking up the plants higher and keeping the vine and leaves away from the ground. One study showed that the lower the leaves are to the ground; the more likely infection will occur and that kiwifruit vines should be staked higher like pergola-grown- vines versus T-bar grown vines. Furthermore, growers can clean up plant debris to help remove the bacterium by removing any infected plants. It is important to also make sure not to overwater and leave a moist environment as this is favorable for the pathogen. In accordance with a number studies, it has been shown that rainfall and moist conditions over a lengthened time period, 10 days in one study, before flowering can lead to a more severe incidence of disease.

Sprays and different forms of fungicides can also be a great way to manage this disease. One example that has been considered is that copper sprays have been shown to work on kiwifruit vines. Studies have shown that copper sulfate and copper oxychloride work well in similar concentrations. However, copper sulfate has worked better in lower concentrations, or less sprays, than a commonly used alternative copper spray known as copper hydrochloride. This spray effectively lowered the population of the bacterial colonies on the surface of the kiwifruit vine, ultimately limiting the number of bacteria that could infect. These sprays should be done before flowering occurs in early spring to limit attacks on flower buds based on data showing when disease incidence first occurs. Besides copper sprays, one study looked at vegetable substances known as gallic and ellagic acids that were sprayed onto kiwifruit plants in a natural and artificial setting. In both settings, the sprays reduced the population of bacteria on the plant and the damage the disease caused. These two sprays did not harm the plant or growth in any way and may be a great alternative to copper sprays in the future. Lastly, resistance is important to helping plants survive and provide an economic benefit to the grower. Unfortunately, there has been no report of any resistant kiwifruit plant to this bacterium, nor have there been any reports of other hosts being resistant as well.
