= Puccinia extensicola var. hieraciata =

Scientific classification
- Domain: Eukaryota
- Kingdom: Fungi
- Division: Basidiomycota
- Class: Pucciniomycetes
- Order: Pucciniales
- Family: Pucciniaceae
- Genus: Puccinia
- Species: P. extensicola
- Variety: P. e. var. hieraciata

Trinomial name
- Puccinia extensicola var. hieraciata (Schwein.) Arthur

Variety of fungus

Puccinia extensicola var. hieraciata is a pathogenic fungus which is known to infect lettuce plants.
