= Sowthistle yellow vein virus =

Virus classification
- (unranked): Virus
- Realm: Riboviria
- Kingdom: Orthornavirae
- Phylum: Negarnaviricota
- Class: Monjiviricetes
- Order: Mononegavirales
- Family: Rhabdoviridae
- Genus: Betanucleorhabdovirus
- Species: Betanucleorhabdovirus venasonchi

Species of virus

Sowthistle yellow vein virus (SYVV) is a plant-pathogenic virus of the family Rhabdoviridae. It infects the sowthistle, Sonchus oleraceous. As of May 2022, the formal species name is Betanucleorhabdovirus venasonchi.

== History ==
Research by Edward S. Sylvester and coworkers in the 1960s–80s showed SYVV was propagated in its insect vector, the black currant aphid (Hyperomyzus lactucae). The plant disease reduced in frequency after around 1990 and apparently disappeared; the virus was rediscovered in Kern County, California, in 2018.

== Classification ==
Historically assigned to the paraphyletic genus Nucleorhabdovirus, SYVV was reclassified in 2019–20 within the new genus of Betanucleorhabdovirus, together with Sonchus yellow net virus, Datura yellow vein virus and other newly categorised species.

Literature on the virus uses the name sowthistle yellow vein virus (SYVV). The formal species name has changed from Sowthistle yellow vein virus to Sowthistle yellow vein nucleorhabdovirus (2015), then Sowthistle yellow vein betanucleorhabdovirus (2019–20), and then Betanucleorhabdovirus venasonchi (2021–22).

== Genome ==
SYVV was genomically characterised in 2020 from the 2018 Kern County isolate. The isolate has 13,719 nucleotides encoding N, P, MP, M, G and L genes.
