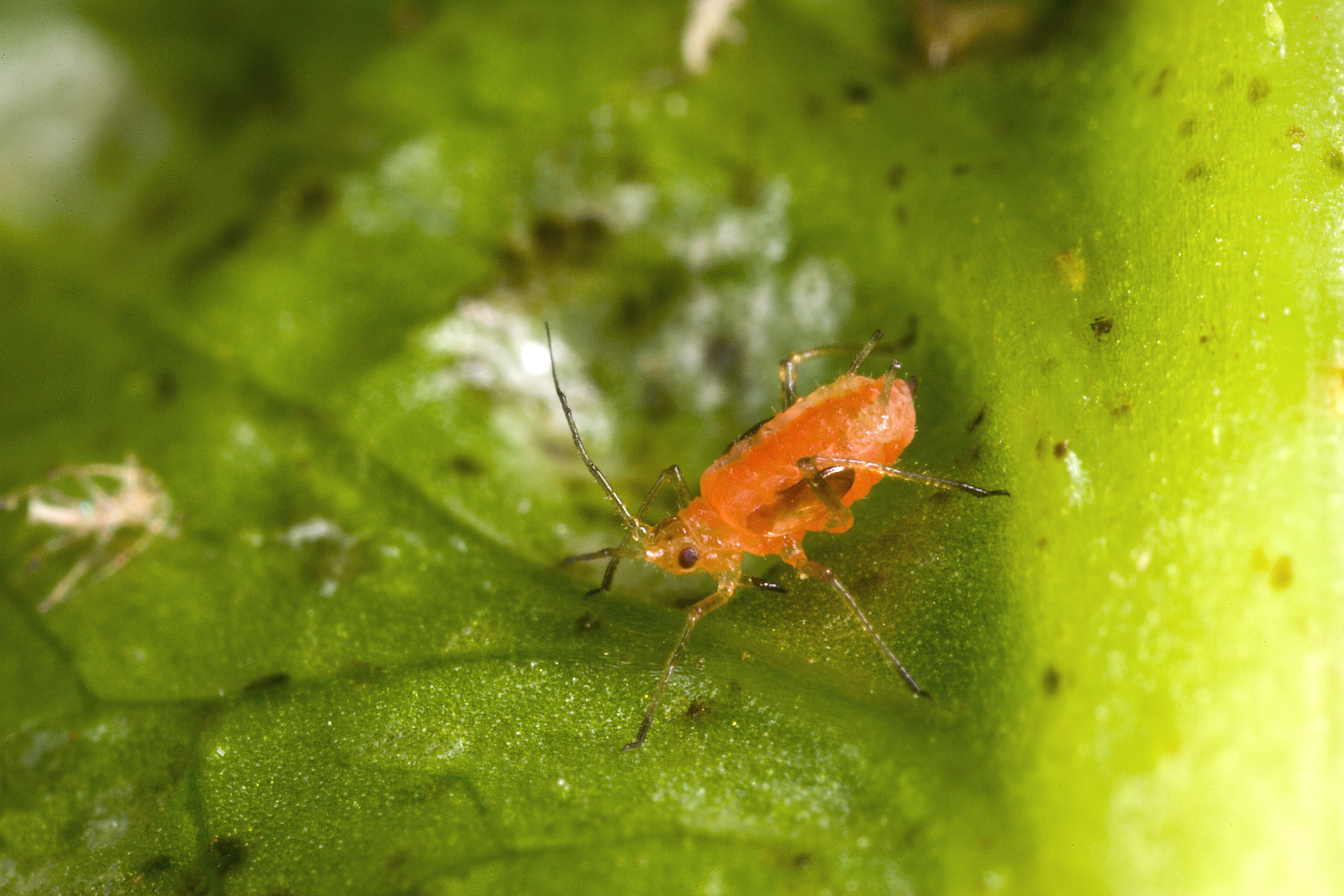
- Lettuce aphid, a carrier of LMV

Virus classification
- (unranked): Virus
- Realm: Riboviria
- Kingdom: Orthornavirae
- Phylum: Pisuviricota
- Class: Stelpaviricetes
- Order: Patatavirales
- Family: Potyviridae
- Genus: Potyvirus
- Species: Potyvirus lactucae

= Lettuce mosaic virus =

Species of virus

Lettuce mosaic virus (LMV) is a potyvirus (genus Potyvirus, family Potyviridae), which causes one of the major virus diseases of lettuce crops worldwide.

LMV is seed-borne at a low but significant rate (1-10% of the seeds produced by an infected mother plant germinate into infected seedlings). This provides the primary inoculum in lettuce crops. LMV, and thus the mosaic disease, is then spread locally from plant to plant by the feeding stylets of aphids.

Like all plant viruses, LMV is totally harmless to the consumer but causes defects in heading, leaf distortions and leaf colour anomalies, which altogether result in the infected lettuce plants to be unmarketable. Disease rates can reach 100% locally, and therefore cause complete loss of the harvest. LMV can also infect other crops such as spinach and peas, as well as ornamentals (especially the Cape Daisy Osteospermum spp) and wild plants (especially the prickly lettuce Lactuca serriola and the oxtongue Helminthia echioides). All these plants, and probably others, can serve as local sources from which LMV can spread to crops.

== Hosts and Symptoms ==
Lettuce mosaic virus (LMV) has a wide host range. All types of lettuce are susceptible, including Crisphead, Romaine, Butterhead, and leaf lettuces. And in nature, the virus infects members of that same family (Asteraceae), including crop plants such as lettuce, endive, escarole, as well as various weeds and wild lettuce species. Perennial weeds and ornamental hosts are also of great importance as they can be reservoirs for inoculum. The most commonly infected cultivated plants are endive, escarole, and lettuce. Other plants such as pea, safflower, and spinach may also become infected.

Lettuce mosaic virus has a wide range of symptoms which depend on the cultivar or the type of lettuce, the age of the plant when infected, and the conditions of the environment. The disease gets its name from the characteristic green and yellow mottling and mosaic pattern that develops on the leaves of infected plants. Other symptoms of LMV often include yellowing of the leaves and vein clearing. In certain lettuce cultivars such as Crisphead, LMV-infected plants experience stunting and distortion of leaves. Leaves often develop a downward rolling of the leaf tips. Some infected plants also fail to form small heads, grow irregularly-shaped leaves, and experience stunting. Necrotic spots on stems and leaves may grow into widespread necrosis.

Depending on the time of infection, infected lettuce cultivars develop different symptoms. Plants that were infected at later stages of growth develop mottling on leaves ranging from light-green to yellow in color. Infected lettuce plants that have flowered develop symptoms such as chlorosis of the leaves and stunting of the plant.

Diagnosis of Lettuce mosaic virus can be difficult despite having characteristic symptoms. Numerous viruses may infect the species, which makes the diagnosis particularly difficult. Diagnosis of LMV infection in lettuce requires diagnostic tests to confirm the disease. Diagnostic tests that may be used to confirm the infection include serological methods such as lateral-flow devices and enzyme-linked immunosorbent assay. Reverse transcription-polymerase chain reaction and sequencing can also be used to confirm the infection. The development of these diagnostic techniques has led to an increase in the speed of diagnosis, allowing for it to occur in-field for lettuce crops.

== Environment ==
While also spread by infected seeds, significant spread of Lettuce mosaic virus occurs from aphids (Denis, 2010). The virus can be spread by many species, including the cotton aphid (Aphis gossypii), the potato aphid (Macrosiphum euphorbiae), and the green peach aphid (Myzus persicae). Spread of the virus by non-persistent aphids has a short feeding period of less than one minute for transmission. Aphids that migrate from crop to crop briefly lead to increased exposure and spread of the virus.

Certain symptoms of LMV are more pronounced in particular climates. Necrotic-like symptoms are more likely to occur in warmer seasonal conditions. Symptoms such as mosaic and mottling are more evident in leaf lettuces and Crisphead lettuces that grow in humid weather conditions. The incidence of plants infected by seed infection is determined by time of year in certain climates. In cultivars grown in California, the percentage of plants infected is significantly higher during the month of June rather than the spring months of March and April. Transmission of the virus in cultivars is considerably affected by the temperature in certain climates. Transmission rate is reduced significantly in high day temperatures compared to low day temperatures.

== Importance ==
Lettuce mosaic virus is a very common and economically important viral disease that affects lettuce worldwide. The virus spread due to an increased exchange of seeds of various lettuce varieties between countries. It was first recorded in 1921 in lettuce crops in Florida. Since then it has been found in most of the world's major lettuce growing countries. It has occurred in the United Kingdom, and all of Europe generally. It also impacts regions of South America (Argentina, Brazil, Uruguay), Asia (China, Japan, Syria) and the Middle East (Egypt, Israel, Jordan). It is found commonly in the United States as well, especially in lettuce cultivars in California.

When planted in cultivars of Little Gem and Saladin, LMV was found to cause devastating yield losses of 85% and 55%, respectively. Most severe losses most often occur in field crops. However, the virus can also infect greenhouse crops if the seedlings are not raised in insect free conditions.

== Prevention ==
Like other diseases caused by viruses in plants, there are no means to cure plants from LMV once they are infected. Prevention of LMV can however be relatively efficient based on:

- control of the absence of LMV in seed lots before trading; typically, ELISA is used and a rejection rate of 1 out of 30,000 seeds is applied;
- the use of the recessive resistance gene mo1; mo1 has two commercial alleles (mo1¹, formerly known as g, and mo1², formerly known as mo), both of which protect plants against LMV accumulation and, in some cases where LMV nevertheless accumulates, protect against symptom expression as well as prevents transmission through seed.

In the late twentieth century, a novel type of LMV appeared in lettuce crops around the world: it was called LMV-Most (mo1-breaking, Seed-Transmitted) to account for its ability to infect and to spread through seeds even in the presence of mo1. Therefore, LMV-Most can only be prevented by controlling seeds, which consumes time, effort and money.
