= Carex molestiformis =

Scientific classification
- Kingdom: Plantae
- Clade: Tracheophytes
- Clade: Angiosperms
- Clade: Monocots
- Clade: Commelinids
- Order: Poales
- Family: Cyperaceae
- Genus: Carex
- Species: C. molestiformis

Binomial name
- Carex molestiformis Reznicek & Rothrock

Species of plant

Carex molestiformis, the frightful sedge, is a species of flowering plant in the family Cyperaceae, native to the east-central US. A perennial reaching 4 ft (1.2 m), it is found in bottomlands, stream banks and floodplains, and roadsides.
