= Microdochium panattonianum =

Scientific classification
- Kingdom: Fungi
- Division: Ascomycota
- Class: Sordariomycetes
- Order: Amphisphaeriales
- Family: Amphisphaeriaceae
- Genus: Microdochium
- Species: M. panattonianum

Binomial name
- Microdochium panattonianum (Berl.) B. Sutton, Galea & T.V. Price, (1986)

Synonyms
- Ascochyta suberosa Rostr., (1938); Didymaria perforans (Ellis & Everh.) Dandeno, (1906); Marssonia panattoniana Berl., Riv. Patol. veg., (1895); Marssonia perforans Ellis & Everh., (1896); Marssonina panattoniana (Berl.) Magnus, (1906)

Species of fungus

Microdochium panattonianum is a fungal plant pathogen. This pathogen causes anthracnose of lettuce, a disease which produces necrotic lesions in cultivated lettuce. In extended periods of wet weather, M. panattonianum can cause significant crop-losses. The impact of this pathogen is exacerbated by farming lettuce without crop rotation, and by planting of susceptible lettuce varieties, such as Romaine lettuce.

== Taxonomy and naming ==
This fungus was first described in 1895 as Marssonia panattoniana by Augusto Napoleone Berlese, an Italian botanist and mycologist. In 1986, the species was moved to the genus Microdochium by Brian Charles Sutton, Victor J. Galea, and T.V. Price.

== Hosts and Symptoms ==
This pathogen infects cultivated lettuce and Lactuca serriola, which is cultivated lettuce’s closest wild relative. The fungus has also been found to infect Cichorium and Crepis capillaris. Necrotic lesions on plant leaves are the characteristic symptom of lettuce anthracnose. Lesions may also be on leaf veins, and are often close to the leaf base. These lesions may fall out, creating "shot-holes" in the leaf. Lesions first appear small, circular, and wet, and may elongate into an oval shape as the disease progresses. Lesion color ranges from dull yellow to reddish brown.

== Description ==
=== Morphology ===
Microdochium panattonianum has a hyphal growth form. The hyphae are septate, branched, and hyaline. The hyphae occur in sub-epidermal and in epidermal tissue. In epidermal tissue, the fungal hyphae form dense wefts. The fungus forms conidia that produce either appressoria or germ tubes. This fungus requires free water for conidial germination. Microsclerotia are also produced and are generally 35-65 micrometers in diameter

=== Infection Mechanism ===
Infection occurs when fungal germ tubes penetrate leaf stomata, or when appressoria penetrate the leaf epidermis. Microsclerotia present in past crop debris will germinate under wet conditions where it will produce hyphae to increase growth and conidiospores that release asexual conidia as a secondary infection; which increases the pathogen’s infection zone.

== Geographic Distribution ==
Incidences of this fungus have been recorded in Africa, Australia, Europe, North America, and South America.

Locations where this pathogen has been discovered include Alaska, Australia, Brazil, Bulgaria, California, Canada, Chile, China, Cuba, Denmark, the eastern United States, Florida, Greece, Idaho, Jamaica, Libya, Mexico, Michigan, Missouri, New Zealand, North Carolina, Ohio, Oregon, Scotland, Serbia, Texas, Washington, and the West Indies.

== Management ==
This pathogen is managed using cultural and chemical controls. Cultural controls can include elimination of prickly lettuce and other potential hosts from the vicinity of lettuce crops, sanitizing surfaces and equipment to remove soil and plant residue which may harbor the pathogen, destroying cull piles and discarded seedlings, and rotating crops. Minimizing periods of leaf wetness aids in control of this pathogen, which requires free water for spore dispersal and germination. Chemical controls can include application of Badge SC or other copper products, mancozeb, and strobilurin fungicides.

Biological controls may be employed as well. The bacterium Streptomyces lydicus (Actinovate) is used as a biological control against M. panattonianum. Recent research has shown that the fungus Trichoderma applied to soil or sprayed in a liquid filtrate onto leaves helps to prevent lettuce anthracnose and reduce symptoms when infection does occur.
