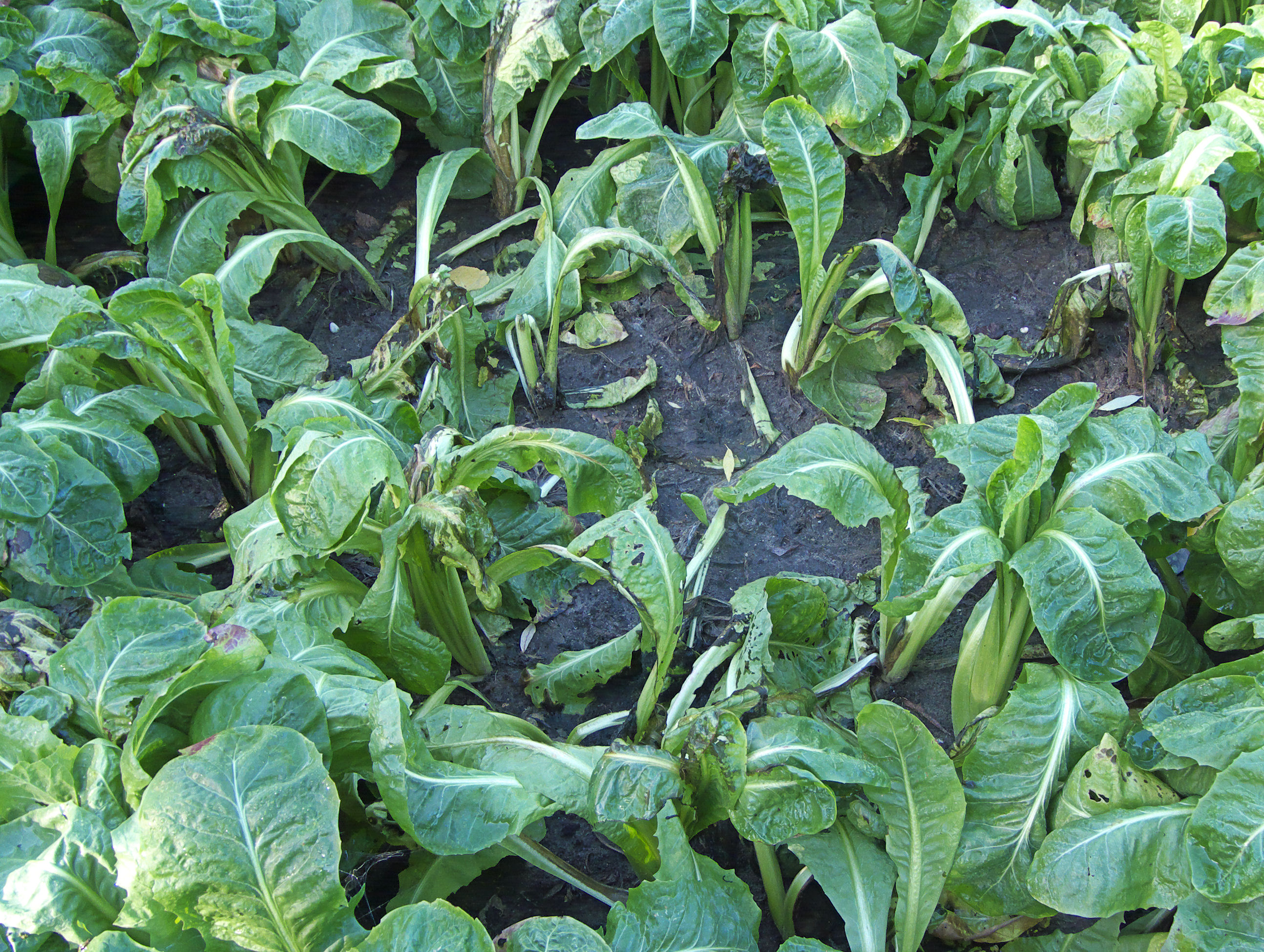
- Chicory infected with Pseudomonas marginalis

Scientific classification
- Domain: Bacteria
- Kingdom: Pseudomonadati
- Phylum: Pseudomonadota
- Class: Gammaproteobacteria
- Order: Pseudomonadales
- Family: Pseudomonadaceae
- Genus: Pseudomonas
- Species: P. marginalis

Binomial name
- Pseudomonas marginalis (Brown 1918) Stevens 1925

Type strain
- ATCC 10844 CFBP 1387; CIP 106712; DSM 13124; ICMP 3553; LMG 2215; NCPPB 667

Pathovars
- Pseudomonas marginalis pv. alfalfae; Pseudomonas marginalis pv. marginalis; Pseudomonas marginalis pv. pastinacae

Synonyms
- Bacterium marginale Brown 1918; Pseudomonas panacis

= Pseudomonas marginalis =

Species of bacterium

Pseudomonas marginalis is a soil bacterium that can cause soft rots of plant tissues. It infects poinsettia, lettuce, and crucifers (canola, mustard).

Based on 16S rRNA analysis, P. marginalis has been placed in the P. fluorescens group.
