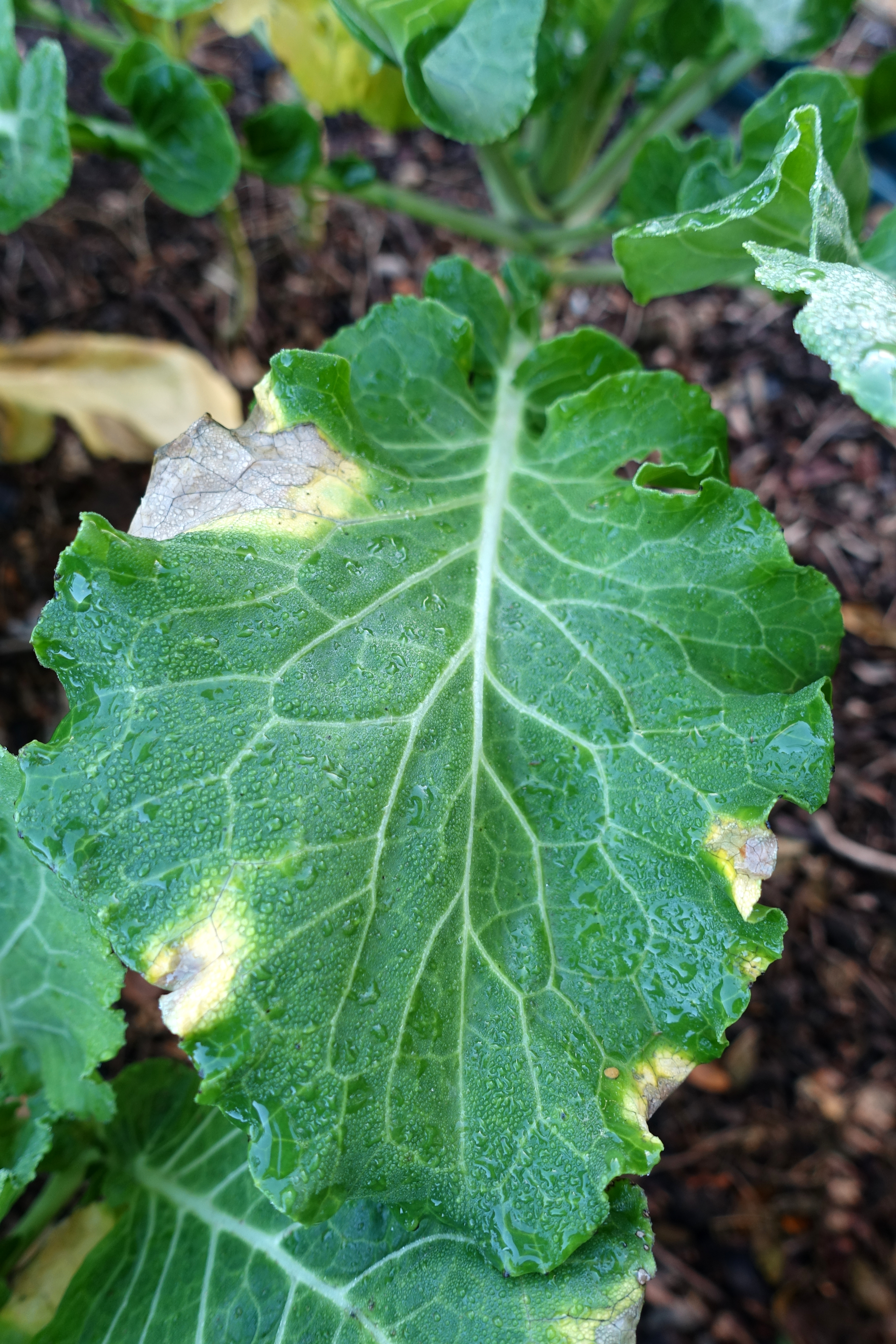
- Black rot of crucifer leaves caused by Xanthomonas campestris pv. campestris

Scientific classification
- Domain: Bacteria
- Kingdom: Pseudomonadati
- Phylum: Pseudomonadota
- Class: Gammaproteobacteria
- Order: Lysobacterales
- Family: Lysobacteraceae
- Genus: Xanthomonas
- Species: X. campestris

Binomial name
- Xanthomonas campestris (Pammel 1895) Dowson 1939

Type strain
- NCPPB 528

Synonyms
- Bacillus campestris Pammel 1895; Pseudomonas campestris (Pammel 1895) Smith 1897; Bacterium campestris (Pammel 1895) Smith 1897; Phytomonas campestris (Pammel 1895) Bergey et al. 1923

= Xanthomonas campestris =

Species of bacterium

Xanthomonas campestris is a gram-negative, obligate aerobic bacterium that is a member of the Xanthomonadaceae, a family of bacteria that are commonly known for their association with plant disease. This species includes Xanthomonas campestris pv. campestris, the cause of black rot in brassicas (cruciferous vegetables), one of the most important diseases of brassicas worldwide.

These bacteria are facultative saprophytes, meaning that they are typically parasitic while also having the ability to live on dead or decaying organic matter under the proper conditions. Upon initial infection, the bacteria remain in the epiphytic stage; however, the harmful endophytic stage is reached when the bacteria actually enter the plant host through natural openings. In general, the genes that contribute significantly to the plant-bacteria relationship are the avirulence (avr) genes, the hypersensitivity response and pathogenicity (hrp) genes, and the pathogenicity factors (rpf) genes. Additionally, the virulence determinants associated with the seedborne diseases that result from this bacterium include extracellular enzymes, polysaccharides, lipopolysaccharides, etc.

Several strains of Xanthomonas campestris produce an exopolysaccharide called xanthan or xanthan gum, which has important uses as a thickener in the food, oil, agricultural, and pharmaceutical industries.

== Pathovars ==
Over 140 pathovars of Xanthomonas campestris have been described initially and typically named according to the plant that they were first found to infect. However, several studies have subsequently proposed the reclassification of many of these pathovars in different species within the genus Xanthomonas. This left six pathovars of X. campestris remaining in this species, which included pathogens of Brassicaceae plants X. campestris pv. aberrans, X. campestris pv. armoraciae, X. campestris pv. barbareae, X. campestris pv. campestris, X. campestris pv. incanae, and X. campestris pv. raphani, but still included a small number of other pathovars like X. campestris pv. plantaginis and X. campestris pv. papavericola.

Further investigation of pathogenicity profiles and multilocus sequencing typing suggested that the list could be narrowed down to just three main pathovars with the different symptoms being black rot, leaf spot, and bacterial blight. Both X. campestris pv. campestris (known for causing black rot of crucifers) and X. campestris pv. incanae (known for causing bacterial blight of garden stocks) are vascular pathogens, and they have been found to invade the plant host through wounds or hydathodes. Xanthomonas campestris pv. campestris also has some limited ability to infect the plant host through the stomata. Xanthomonas pv. raphani has been found to enter the plant through its stomata to cause infection of the tissue, or rather parenchyma. This results in bacterial spot on a wider range of hosts, which includes both crucifers and certain solanaceous plants.

12 pathovars (vitiswoodrowii, vitiscarnosae, vitistrifoliae, bilvae, azadirachtae, durantae, centellae, thespesiae, leeana, merremiae, thirumalacharii, and trichodesmae) were moved to Xanthomonas citri based on phylogenomic evidence in 2022. Pathovars transferred earlier to X. citri include viticola.

20 pathovars were moved to Xanthomonas euvesicatoria in 2023 based on phylogenomic evidence.

== Phytopathology ==
Relationships between Xanthomonas campestris bacteria and plants can be both compatible and incompatible. It is in the compatible relationships, where the bacteria are able to overcome the host's defenses, rather than experience attenuated growth, that disease symptoms will be seen in the plants. This is due to toxins, extracellular enzymes (exported by the type II secretion system), polysaccharides, lipopolysaccharides, a fatty acid-dependent cell-cell communication system, and proteins (secreted by the type III secretion system), for example. The genes in the bacterial genome that are responsible for such interactions include avirulence (avr) and hypersensitivity response and pathogenicity (hrp) genes.

Gene-for-gene patterns control the interactions between the Xanthomonas campestris, a bacterial pathogen, and plants. Avr genes are a group of genes that impact the specificity of the interaction between the bacteria and the plant host. When either these bacterial genes or a plant's resistance genes to the pathogen are not present, the interaction will result in disease. Alternatively, when the genes are present, the plant's resistance genes will produce a product that is able to recognize the avr genes of the bacteria, which allows for the plant host to have resistance. Hrp genes are responsible for the determination of the outcome of the interaction between the plant and bacteria. When mutation occurs within these genes, there is impact on both compatible and incompatible interactions. This is the case because there may be an impact on pathogenicity and hypersensitivity response, respectively. Therefore, the plant's ability to limit the spread of the microbial pathogen may be inhibited.

The regulation of pathogenicity factors (rpf) gene cluster also plays an important role in the plant-bacteria interactions by encoding for a cell-cell signaling system involving diffusible signal factor that is necessary for full virulence. This regulation system is involved in the regulation of both the formation and dispersal of Xanthomonas campestris biofilms, which is specifically related to the rpfB and rpfF genes within the cluster. With a mutation in the rpf genes, the synthesis of various extracellular enzymes will be downregulated. This includes endoglucanase, protease, and extracellular polysaccharide (EPS) xanthan, for example, which are important to the virulence of the bacteria.

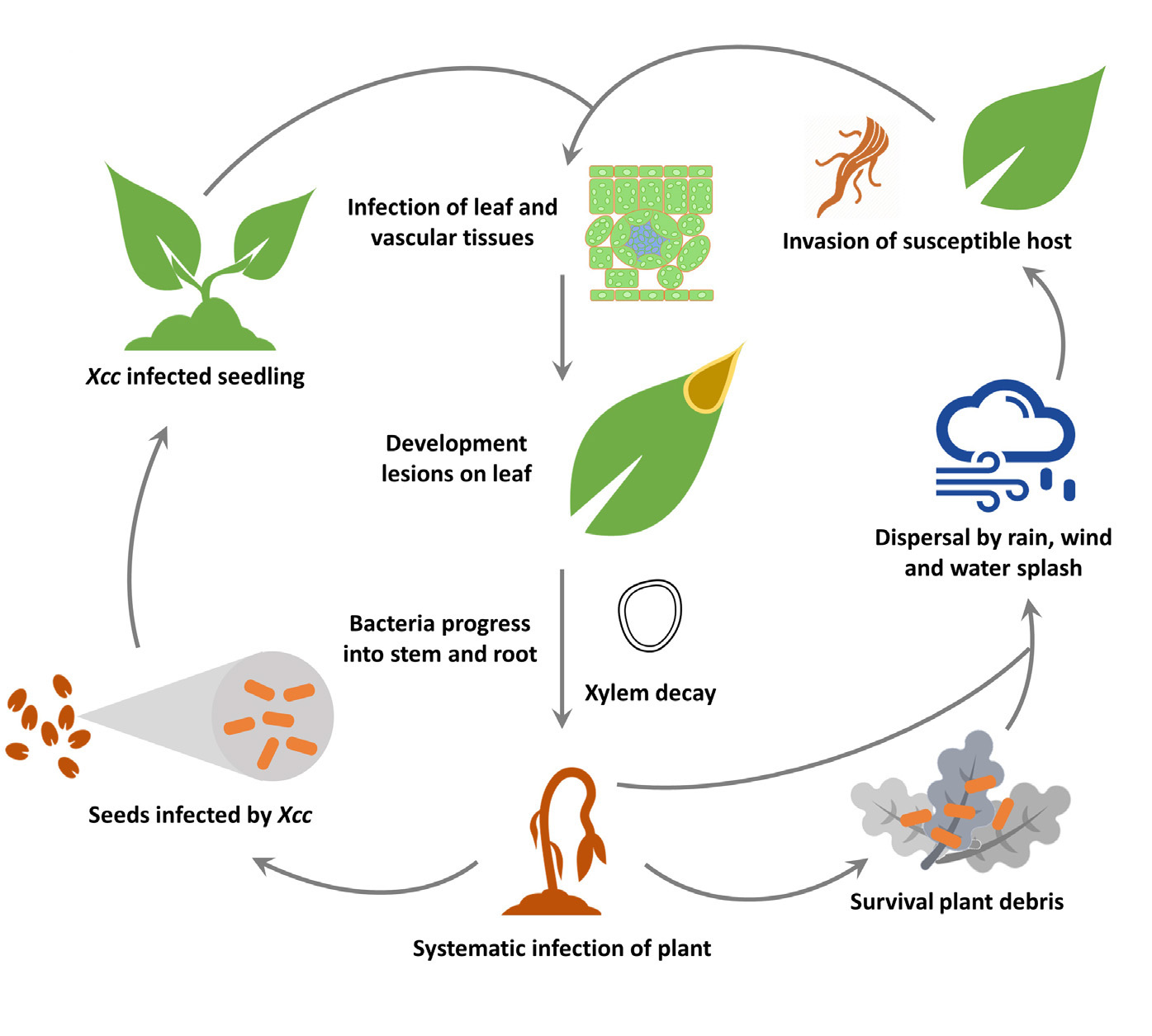
Xanthomonas lifecycle and infection cycle in plants.

Like with Xanthomonas species in general, the primary route of transmission for Xanthomonas campestris is through seeds, which act as the source of inoculum. Therefore, the bacteria are initially in the epiphytic stage of the infection cycle, which is when they grow on the surface of the plant, such as on the aerial tissues of leaves and fruit. Various adhesion strategies are utilized by the microbes in order to remain attached to the plant surfaces, and this includes bacterial surface polysaccharides, adhesion proteins, and type IV pili. Then, biofilm matrices composed primarily of xanthan will form, which will help the bacteria to survive in the harsh abiotic conditions of the plant surfaces. These biofilms, along with pigments, also help the bacteria to survive the potential damages to DNA and membrane that result from radiation and light. Eventually, the bacteria enter the host tissue through natural openings such as pores and stomata, or wounds, which is hypothesized to be a result of chemotaxis. When this happens, the endophytic stage has been reached and colonization in the vascular system or parenchyma takes place. This is when the development of symptoms, such as lesions of leaves, will occur. Progression into the stem and roots can eventually happen as well, which is when there is systematic infection of the plant. Furthermore, Xanthomonas campestris can be spread to other plants when the population of bacteria has increased enough that they emerge on the plant surfaces again. This dispersal includes both environmental and mechanical routes, such as through wind, rain, people, non-specific vectors, seed dispersal, etc.

== Industrial applications ==
Chemical structure of xanthan gum.

Xanthomonas campestris is commonly used industrially to produce a water-soluble exo-polysaccharide, known as xanthan gum, from fermentation of carbon sources like glucose. In this process, a preserved culture of the gram-negative bacterium is expanded through growth and then used as an inoculum in bioreactors with liquid growth media. Under select modes of operation, such as batch fermentation, and proper growth conditions, fermentation then takes place. Therefore, as the microorganism grows, there is production of xanthan, which is secreted from the bacterial cells and ultimately recovered from the media and purified using alcohol precipitation techniques.

This product is particularly applicable to the food industry as a suspending, thickening, and stabilizing agent. However, it also has applications pertaining to the agricultural industry, the oil industry, the pharmaceutical industry, etc. Because of that, work is being done to investigate advancements that can be made to the current xanthan gum production processes.
