= Xanthan gum =

Polysaccharide gum used as a food additive and thickener

Names
- Other names E 415

Identifiers
CAS Number	11138-66-2
ChemSpider	None
ECHA InfoCard	100.031.255
EC Number	234-394-2
E number	E415 (thickeners, ...)
UNII	TTV12P4NEE
CompTox Dashboard (EPA)	DTXSID4044169

Properties
Chemical formula	C_{35}H_{49}O_{29} (monomer)
Molar mass	933.748 g·mol^{−1}

Hazards
Safety data sheet (SDS)	MSDS
- Except where otherwise noted, data are given for materials in their standard state (at 25 °C [77 °F], 100 kPa). verify (what is ?) Infobox references

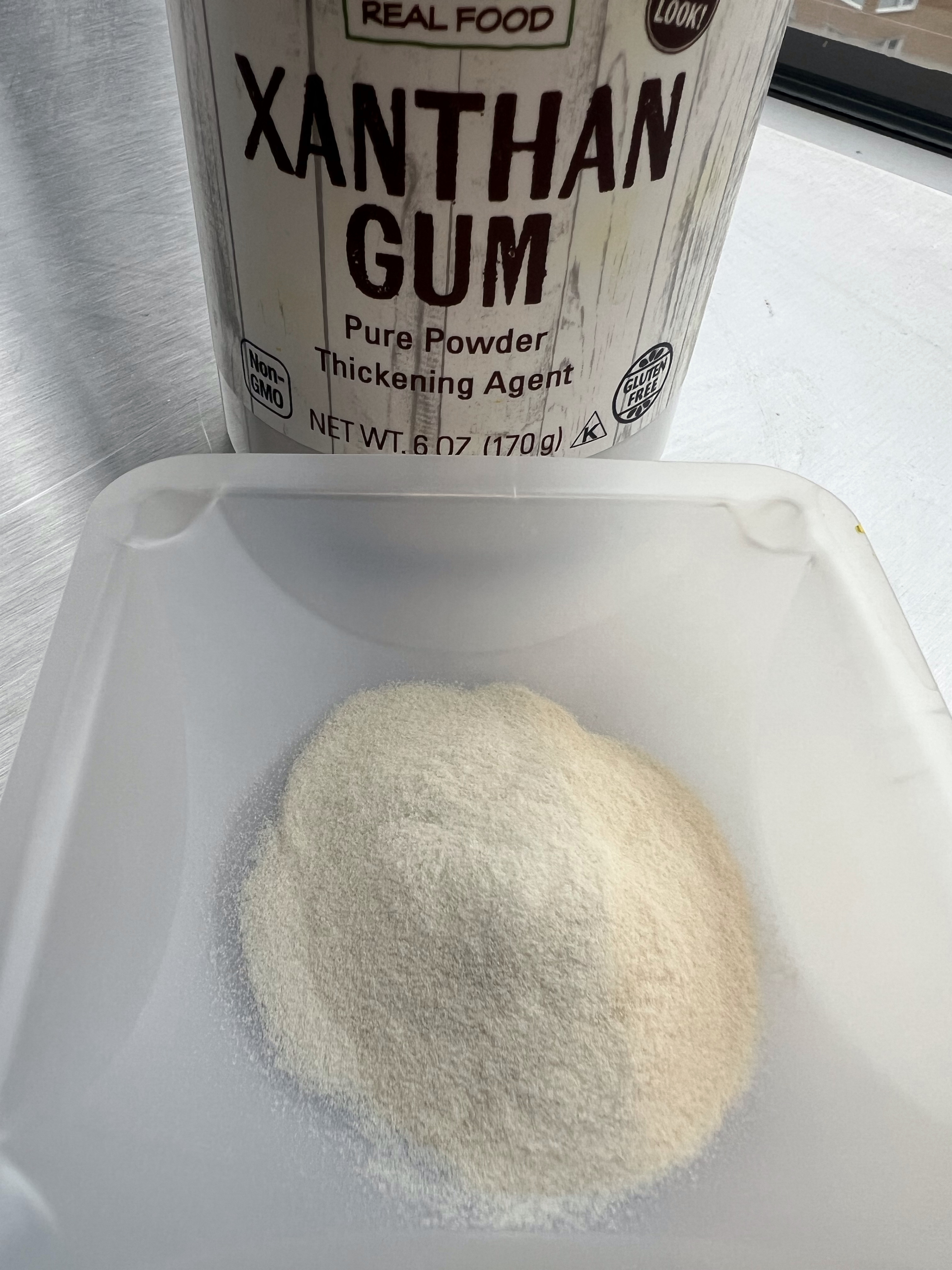
Xanthan gum powder

Xanthan gum (/ˈzænθən/) is a polysaccharide with many industrial uses, including as a common food additive. It is an effective thickening agent and stabilizer that prevents ingredients from separating. It can be produced from simple sugars by fermentation and derives its name from the species of bacteria used, Xanthomonas campestris.

== History ==
Xanthan gum was discovered by Allene Rosalind Jeanes and her research team at the United States Department of Agriculture and brought into commercial production by CP Kelco in the early 1960s under the trade name Kelzan, remaining the only manufacturer in the United States. It was approved for use in foods in 1968 and is accepted as a safe food additive in the US, Canada, European countries, and many other countries, with E number E415 and CAS number 11138-66-2.

Xanthan gum derives its name from the species of bacteria used during the fermentation process, Xanthomonas campestris.

== Uses ==
The addition of 1% xanthan gum can produce a significant increase in the viscosity of a liquid.

In foods, xanthan gum is a common ingredient in salad dressings and sauces. It helps to prevent oil separation by stabilizing the emulsion, although it is not an emulsifier. Xanthan gum also helps suspend solid particles, such as spices, and it helps create the desired texture in many ice creams. Toothpaste often contains xanthan gum as a binder to keep the product uniform. Xanthan gum also helps thicken commercial egg substitutes made from egg whites by replacing the fat and emulsifiers found in yolks. It is also a preferred method of thickening liquids for those with swallowing disorders, since it does not change the color or flavor of foods or beverages at typical use levels. In gluten-free baking, xanthan gum is used to give the dough or batter the stickiness that would otherwise be achieved with gluten. In most foods, it is used at concentrations of 0.5% or less. Xanthan gum is used in a wide range of food products, such as sauces, dressings, meat and poultry products, bakery products, confectionery products, beverages, dairy products, and others.

In the petroleum industry, xanthan gum is used in large quantities to thicken drilling mud. These fluids carry the solids cut by the drilling bit to the surface. Xanthan gum provides improved low velocity, or "low end", rheology. When circulation stops, the solids remain suspended in the drilling fluid. The widespread use of slant drilling and the demand for good control of drilled solids has led to its expanded use. It has been added to concrete poured underwater in order to increase its viscosity and prevent washout.

In cosmetics, xanthan gum is used to prepare water gels. It is also used in oil-in-water emulsions to enhance droplet coalescence. Xanthan gum is under preliminary research for its potential uses in tissue engineering to construct hydrogels and scaffolds supporting three-dimensional tissue formation. Furthermore, thiolated xanthan gum (see thiomers) has shown potential for drug delivery, since by the covalent attachment of thiol groups to this polysaccharide, high mucoadhesive and permeation enhancing properties can be introduced.

=== Shear thinning ===
The viscosity of xanthan gum solutions decreases with higher shear rates. This is called shear thinning or pseudoplasticity. This means that a product subjected to shear, whether from mixing, shaking, or chewing, will thin. This is similar to the behaviour of tomato ketchup. When the shear forces are removed, the food will thicken again. In salad dressing, the addition of xanthan gum makes it thick enough at rest in the bottle to keep the mixture fairly homogeneous, but the shear forces generated by shaking and pouring thins it, so it can be easily poured. When it exits the bottle, the shear forces are removed and it thickens again, so it clings to the salad. At higher concentrations of xanthan gum, water solutions become visco-elastic

=== Concentrations used ===
The greater the concentration of xanthan gum in a liquid, the thicker the liquid will become. An emulsion can be formed with as little as 0.1% (by weight). Increasing the concentration of gum gives a thicker, more stable emulsion, up to 1% xanthan gum. A teaspoon of xanthan gum weighs about 2.5 grams and brings one cup (250 ml) of water to a 1% concentration.

To make a foam, 0.2–0.8% xanthan gum is typically used. Larger amounts result in larger bubbles and denser foam. Egg white powder (0.2–2.0%) with 0.1–0.4% xanthan gum yields bubbles similar to soap bubbles.

== Safety ==
According to a 2017 safety review by a scientific panel of the European Food Safety Authority (EFSA), xanthan gum (European food additive number E 415) is extensively digested during intestinal fermentation and causes no adverse effects, even at high intake amounts. The EFSA panel found no concern about genotoxicity from long-term consumption. The EFSA concluded that there is no safety concern for the general population when xanthan gum is consumed as a food additive.

== Preparation ==
Xanthan gum is produced by the fermentation of glucose and sucrose. The medium is well-aerated and stirred, and the xanthan polymer is produced extracellularly into the medium. After one to four days, the polymer is precipitated from the medium by the addition of isopropyl alcohol, and the precipitate is dried and milled to give a powder that is readily soluble in water or brine.

It is composed of pentasaccharide repeat units, comprising glucose, mannose, and glucuronic acid in the molar ratio 2:2:1.

A strain of X. campestris that will grow on lactose has been developed, which allows it to be used to process whey, a waste product of cheese production. This can produce 30 g/L of xanthan gum for every 40 g/L of whey powder. Whey-derived xanthan gum is commonly used in many commercial products, such as shampoos and salad dressings.

=== Detail of the biosynthesis ===
Synthesis originates from glucose as substrate for synthesis of the sugar nucleotides precursors UDP-glucose, UDP-glucuronate, and GDP-mannose that are required for building the pentasaccharide repeat unit. This links the synthesis of xanthan to carbohydrate metabolism. The repeat units are built up at undecaprenylphosphate lipid carriers that are anchored in the cytoplasmic membrane.

Specific glycosyltransferases sequentially transfer the sugar moieties of the nucleotide sugar xanthan precursors to the lipid carriers. Acetyl and pyruvyl residues are added as non-carbohydrate decorations. Mature repeat units are polymerized and exported in a way resembling the Wzy-dependent polysaccharide synthesis mechanism of Enterobacteriaceae. Products of the gum gene cluster drive synthesis, polymerization, and export of the repeat unit.
