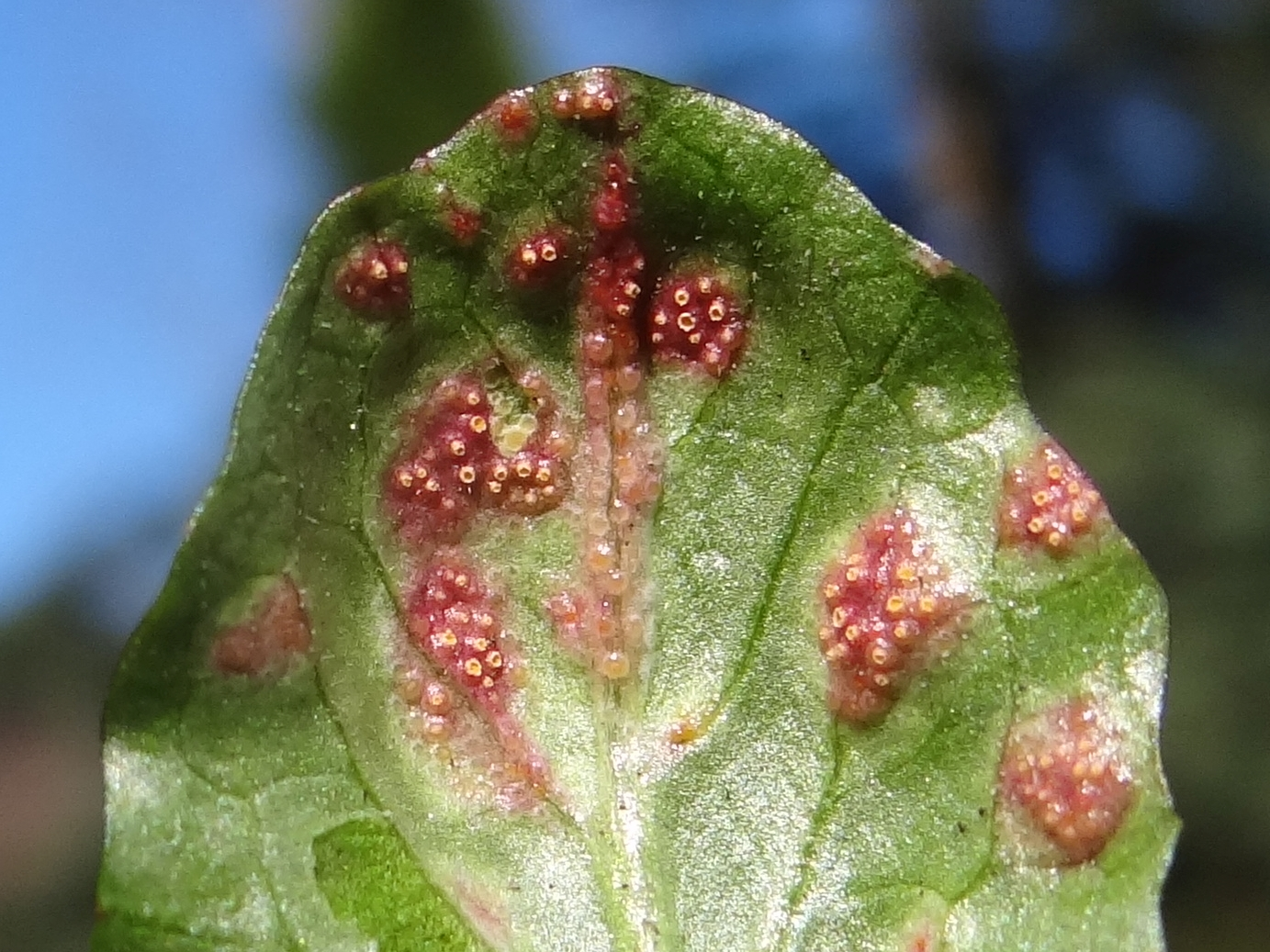
- Puccinia dioicae on a leaf of Taraxacum officinale

Scientific classification
- Kingdom: Fungi
- Division: Basidiomycota
- Class: Pucciniomycetes
- Order: Pucciniales
- Family: Pucciniaceae
- Genus: Puccinia
- Species: P. dioicae

Binomial name
- Puccinia dioicae Magnus (1877)

Synonyms
- Aecidium compositarum var. taraxaci (Kunze & J.C. Schmidt) Grev., (1824); Aecidium taraxaci Kunze & J.C. Schmidt, (1817); Dicaeoma dioicae (Magnus) Syd., (1922)

= Puccinia dioicae =

Species of fungus

Puccinia dioicae is a plant pathogen that causes rust on goldenrod.

It is common in Iceland, where it infects Taraxacum species and Carex capillaris. Pycniospores and aeciospores are found on Taraxacum sp., and uredospores and teliospores are found on Carex capillaris.

== See also ==
- List of Puccinia species
