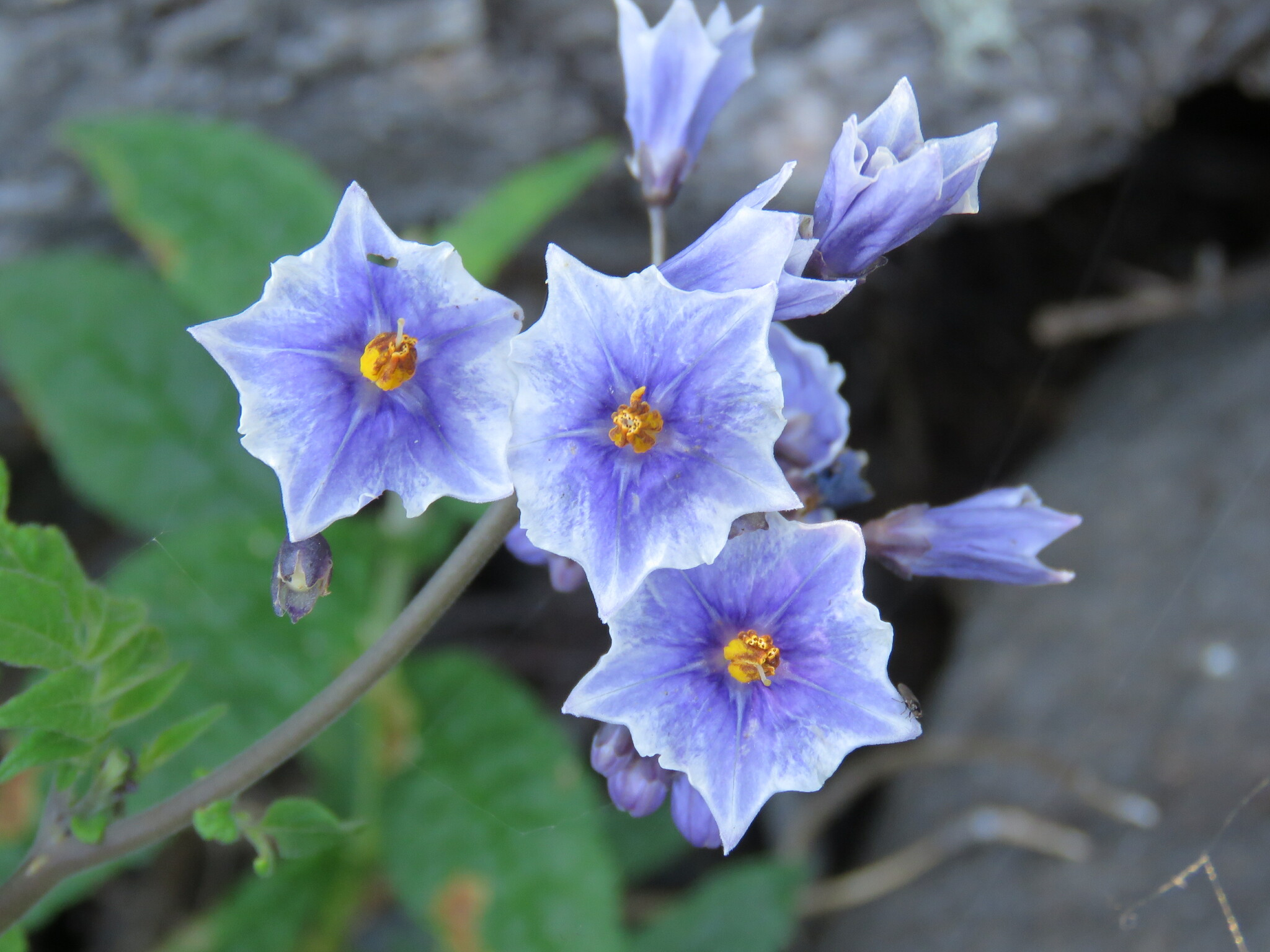

Scientific classification
- Kingdom: Plantae
- Clade: Tracheophytes
- Clade: Angiosperms
- Clade: Eudicots
- Clade: Asterids
- Order: Solanales
- Family: Solanaceae
- Genus: Solanum
- Species: S. palustre

Binomial name
- Solanum palustre Poepp. ex Schltdl.

Synonyms
- List: Solanum brevidens Phil.; Solanum brevidens var. glabrescens (Walp.) Hawkes; Solanum brevidens var. glabrescens (Walp.) Hawkes; Solanum bridgesii A.DC.; Solanum caldasii var. glabrescens (Walp.) DC.; Solanum palustre var. glabrescens Walp.; Solanum pearcei Phil.; Solanum tuberosum var. brevidens Reiche

= Solanum palustre =

Species of plant in the nightshade family

Solanum palustre (syn. Solanum brevidens) is a species of wild potato in the family Solanaceae. It is native to central and southern Chile, and Neuquén and Río Negro Provinces of Argentina. Although it does not bear tubers, it is still being extensively studied for its resistance to Potato virus Y, Potato leafroll virus, early blight, late blight, common scab, bacterial soft rot, and frost.

Solaunum palustre is part of the Petota lineage, which is a subclade of the Potato clade (which also includes the Tomato clade). An updated phylogenetic analysis from 2025 employing genomic information confirmed this to be one of the three species belonging to the Etuberosum subclade, alongside Solanum etuberosum and Solanum fernandezianum. This study also suggested that an ancient member of the Etuberosum clade may have hybridized with a member of the Tomato clade to produce modern potatoes (Petota clade).
