= Alturas potato =

Potato cultivar

Alturas is a russet potato variety released in 2002 by the USDA-ARS and the Agricultural Experiment Stations of Idaho, Oregon, and Washington and it is under plant variety protection. It is a processing potato that has cold-sweetening resistance, so it can be processed directly out of storage into French fries and other frozen potato products.

== Botanical features ==
- Tubers are lightly russeted with brown skin
- Tubers are oval to oblong
- Tuber sprouts are green
- Flesh is white and has a shallow eyes
- Has a large, open canopy and is a late-maturing variety
- Plant stems are green with some anthocyanin pigmentation
- Has white flowers and yellow anthers
- Range of one to eight inflorescences per plant

=== Agricultural features ===
- Higher yields and higher specific gravity than Russet Burbank
- Resistant to Verticillium wilt and early blight
- Superior to the more common Russet Burbank in that it is more resistant to Corky ringspot, late blight, tuber net necrosis (caused by Potato leafroll virus), Fusarium dry rot, and common scab
- Susceptible to Potato virus X, Potato virus Y, bacterial soft rot, root-knot nematode, and bacterial ring rot
