= Copper pesticide =

Copper compounds used as agricultural pesticides

Copper pesticides are copper compounds used as bactericides, algaecides, or fungicides. They can kill bacteria, oomycetes and algae, and prevent fungal spores from germinating. Common forms of fixed copper fungicides include copper sulfate, copper sulfate pentahydrate, copper hydroxide, copper oxychloride sulfate, cuprous oxide, and copper octanoate.

Copper fungicides work by slowly releasing positively charged copper ions Cu^{+} and Cu^{2+} in concentrations that interact with nucleic acids, interfere with energy transport, disrupt enzyme activity, and affect the integrity of cell membranes of pathogens. Both ions have fungicidal and bactericidal activity. Following absorption into the fungus or bacterium, the copper ions will link to various chemical groups (imidazole, phosphate, sulfhydryl, and, hydroxyl groups) present in many proteins and disrupt their functions. Copper ions can kill pathogen cells on plant surfaces, but once a pathogen enters host plant tissue, it is no longer susceptible to copper treatments at the prescribed concentrations. The prescribed copper ion concentrations lack post-infection activity. Higher copper ion concentrations harm the host plant.

== Application ==
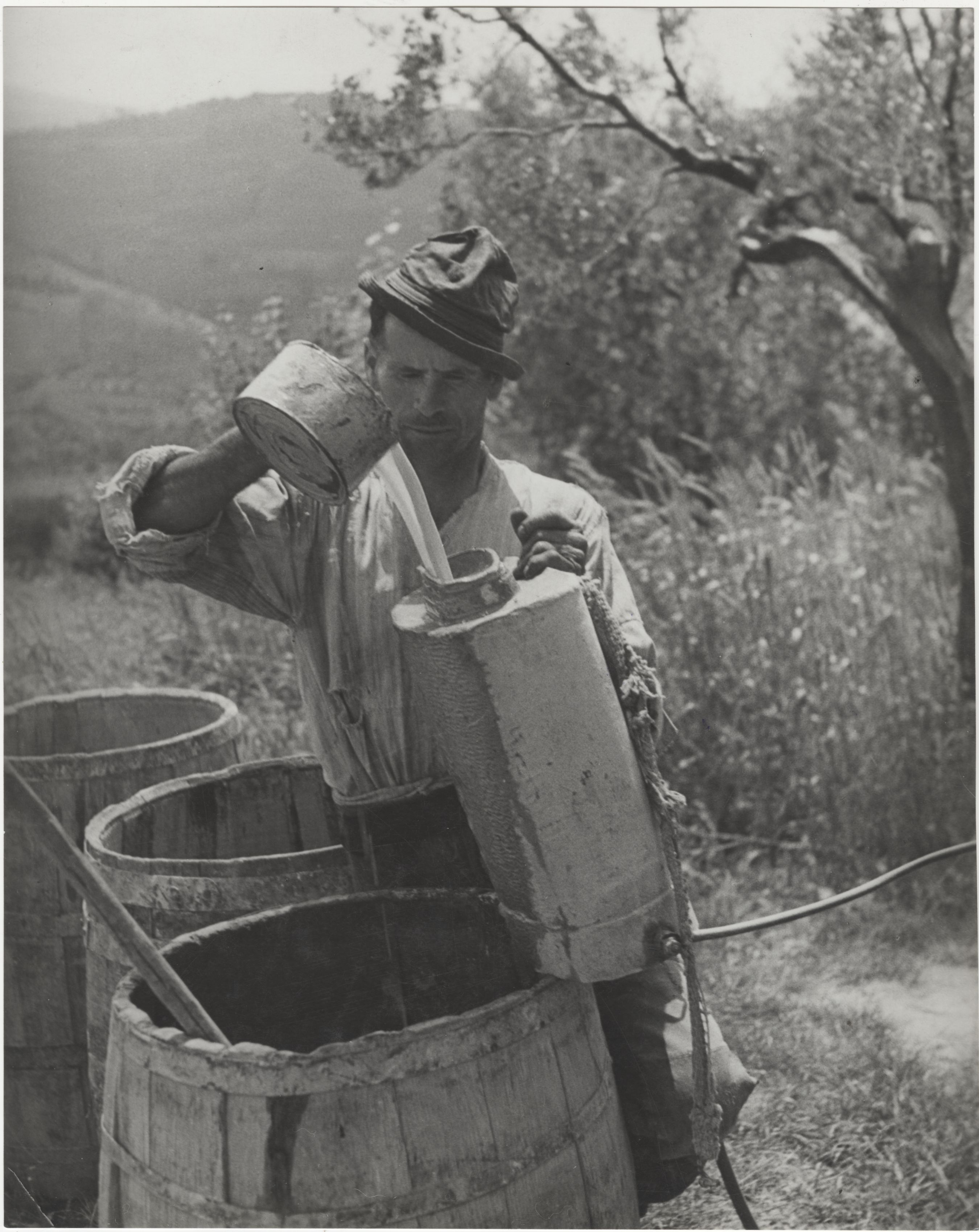
The use of copper pesticide in viticulture in 1940

Copper pesticide is applied as a contact protective foliar spray, so it remains deposited on leaf surfaces. A small concentration of copper ions may be taken up by plants as essential nutrients. Copper foliar sprays are also applied to correct plant copper deficiency. Excess absorbed copper ions can kill sensitive cells in copper sensitive plants. The leaves of stone fruit trees are more sensitive to copper phytotoxicity than apple leaves. Copper tolerant plant families include Cruciferae, Caryophyllaceae, Gramineae, Leguminosae and Asteraceae.

Copper phytotoxicity worsens under slow drying conditions. Adding surfactants with copper fungicides may increase injury to plant foliage. Copper ions release more readily under acidic conditions and copper pesticides, except copper sulfate pentahydrate, should not be used with acid forming products. Copper fungicides can be highly effective if applied prophylactically and with complete coverage of all plant foliar surfaces, including the undersides of leaves where the pathogen typically sporulates.

Copper pesticides must be used in quantities that minimizes long term copper accumulation in the soil. Accumulated copper in soils can inhibit root growth and adversely affect microorganisms and earthworms. Finely ground copper formulations are more active than coarsely ground formulations. Coarsely ground formulations should be avoided to limit long term bioaccumulation and toxicity. Copper occurs in soils in different forms (ionic, complexed and precipitated) depending on characteristics such as soil texture, organic matter and pH.

== Effectiveness ==
A strategy to maximize the effectiveness of copper ions is to reduce the particle size of the active substance (micronization) and copper microencapsulation. These improve relative coverage of treated plant surfaces or extend copper ion releases. Modern copper application dose rates may be as low as 200-400g per treatment per hectare.

Copper pesticides can be effective in preventing bacterial diseases, including Erwinia soft rot, Pseudomonas and Xanthomonas leaf spots, and fungal diseases including Botrytis, Plasmopara viticola, Pseudoperonospora humuli, Venturia inaequalis, Bremia lactucae, Peronospora destructor, Taphrina deformans, Stemphylium vesicarium, Cercospora beticola, Phytophthora infestans, Puccinia triticina, Puccinia striiformis and Alternaria solani. Several bacterial pathogens have developed resistance to some copper ion concentrations. These include Pseudomonas syringae, Erwinia amylovora and Xanthomonas campestris pv. vesicatoria.

Copper pesticides may not prevent Sclerotinia blight, some Phytophthora, and Rhizoctonia,

Bordeaux mixture, made by adding copper sulfate and calcium hydroxide to water, was one of the first fungicides used by Pierre-Marie-Alexis Millardet, a French viticulturist during the mid-1800s.

== Use in organic farming ==
In the UK the Soil Association (one of the organic certification authorities) permits farmers to use some copper fungicides on organic land used for the production of certified organic crops only if there is a major threat to crops. The compounds permitted are copper sulfate, copper hydroxide, cuprous oxide, copper oxychloride, copper ammonium carbonate (at a maximum concentration of 25 g/L), and copper octanoate. According to the Soil Association the total copper that can be applied to organic land is 6 kg/ha/year. This limit is designed so that the amount of copper in the soil does not exceed the limits specified in the Soil Association standards for heavy metals.
