= Umatilla Russet =

Potato variety

Potato 'Umatilla Russet'
- Genus: Solanum
- Species: Solanum tuberosum
- Cultivar: 'Umatilla Russet'

Umatilla Russet (/ˌjuːməˈtɪlə/, YOO-mə-TIL-ə) is a moderately late maturing variety of potato especially suitable for frozen french fries processing. It was jointly released by the Agricultural Experiment Station of Oregon, Idaho, and Washington and the U.S. Department of Agriculture in 1998. 'Umatilla Russet' has been equal to or better than Russet Burbank in fry color in Oregon and regional trials. The potato was named by the state of Oregon after the Umatilla tribe, from which the city of Umatilla also takes its name.

== Characteristics ==
=== Botanical ===
- Tuber skin is tan color and russety-like
- Tubers are long with a tendency for tapered apical ends
- Flesh is slightly creamy
- Leaves are dark green, medium pubescence
- Few (up to 7) flowers per plant
- Flowers are light purple with a yellow-orange center cone

=== Agricultural ===
Umatilla Russet is less susceptible to Verticillium wilt than other varieties. It is also less susceptible to net necrosis and resistant to Potato Virus X. This variety expresses foliar symptoms of Potato virus Y (PVY). Umatilla Russet is less susceptible to tuber infection and decay caused by Phytophthora infestans but more susceptible to blackspot and shatter bruise than other varieties. Lastly, this variety is less susceptible to hollow heart, brown center, growth cracks and sugar ends.
