= Altura =

Altura may refer to:

- Altura (Trieste), a neighbourhood in Trieste, Italy
- Altura (Castro Marim), a town and civil parish in the Algarve, Portugal
- Altura (Castellón), a municipality in Spain
- Altura, Minnesota, a city in the US
- Altura, New Jersey, an unincorporated community in the US
- Altura Credit Union, a credit union in California, US
- Altura, a fictional kingdom in Italo Montemezzi's L'amore dei tre re
- Altura (film), a 1949 Italian drama film

== See also ==
- Alturas (disambiguation)
