= Rainier Russet =

Potato cultivar

Rainier Russet is a russet potato cultivar released in 2020. It was developed at the Small Grains and Potato Germplasm Research Center in Aberdeen, Washington. The breeding parents of Rainier are Canela Russet and an Aberdeen breeding clone. It has cold-sweetening resistance, so it can be processed directly out of storage into many frozen potato products. However, it is classified as a fresh market potato, indicating that it is primarily grown for direct consumption rather than for processing into potato products like chips or fries.
