= Ranger Russet =

Variety of potato

Potato 'Ranger Russet'
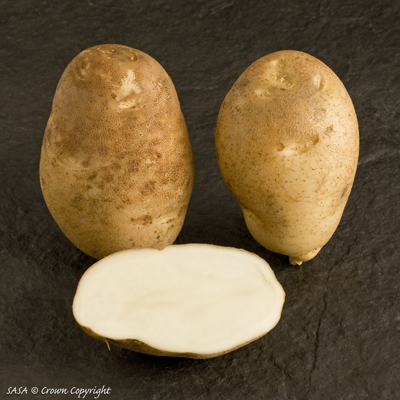
- Genus: Solanum
- Species: Solanum tuberosum
- Cultivar: 'Ranger Russet'
- Breeder: Joseph J. Pavek, USDA
- Origin: Aberdeen, Idaho, USA

The Ranger Russet is a late-maturing potato that is used for baking and processing into fries. It was originally bred by Joseph J. Pavek of the USDA in Aberdeen, Idaho, and released jointly by the USDA and the agricultural stations of Idaho, Washington, Oregon and Colorado in 1991. Ranger Russet is not under plant variety protection. It yields medium to high numbers of tubers with a short dormancy phase.

== Botanical Features ==
The Ranger Russet plant is characterized by a medium-to-tall, semi-upright growth habit with single, wavy, and prominent wings. Stems exhibit slight pigmentation with non-pigmented, moderately swollen nodes. The leaves are medium green and open, featuring weakly pigmented midribs.

Primary leaflets typically appear in four pairs and are narrowly ovate with acuminate (tapered) tips and symmetrical, obtuse bases. Terminal leaflets share this shape but feature an asymmetrical base. Sprouts are broad and cylindrical; the base is a medium red-violet with strong pubescence (fine hairs), while the apex is weakly pigmented.

The variety produces numerous flowers with a medium red-violet corolla and lemon-yellow anthers. The flower buds are notably dark and strongly pigmented. Tubers are long and slightly flattened, with a brown russeted skin and white flesh. The eyes are moderately deep and evenly distributed, and the tubers are noted for their high specific gravity.

== Agricultural Features ==
- This variety has a high resistance to heat necrosis, hollow heart (hollowed center of potato), Verticillium wilt, PVY, and PVX.
- It has moderate resistance to early blight, common scab, leafroll, and Fusarium dry rot.
- It is moderately susceptible to growth cracks.
- Ranger Russet is very susceptible to late blight and root-knot nematode.

== Storage ==
Ranger Russet has a dormancy phase of approximately 100 days when stored at 45 °F. This means if the potatoes are being stored to be used as seed, they must be kept about 7-9 degrees cooler in order to prevent excessive sprouting and aging. Potatoes which are in storage to be used for processing can be stored in the same type of conditions as Russet Burbank potatoes. If the potatoes are in storage for more than three months, a chemical sprout inhibitor should be applied before the 90th day. If the potatoes are immature or damaged, fusarium dry rot can become an issue. It is also important that the storage unit is at a high humidity level to reduce the risk of pressure bruising.

== Botanical and Plant Characteristics ==
It is a cross between the Butte and A6595-3 varieties, and looks large, upright to spreading growth habit. The stems are thick and green, but they turn a purple-red color if exposed to bright sunlight often. The flowers grow large, turning a purple-pink color with a bright yellow center. The potato itself is long, oval, and flat, rather than perfectly round as most potatoes. The netted skin texture of the potato is called russet, leading to the name "Ranger Russet". It is a high yield plant.
