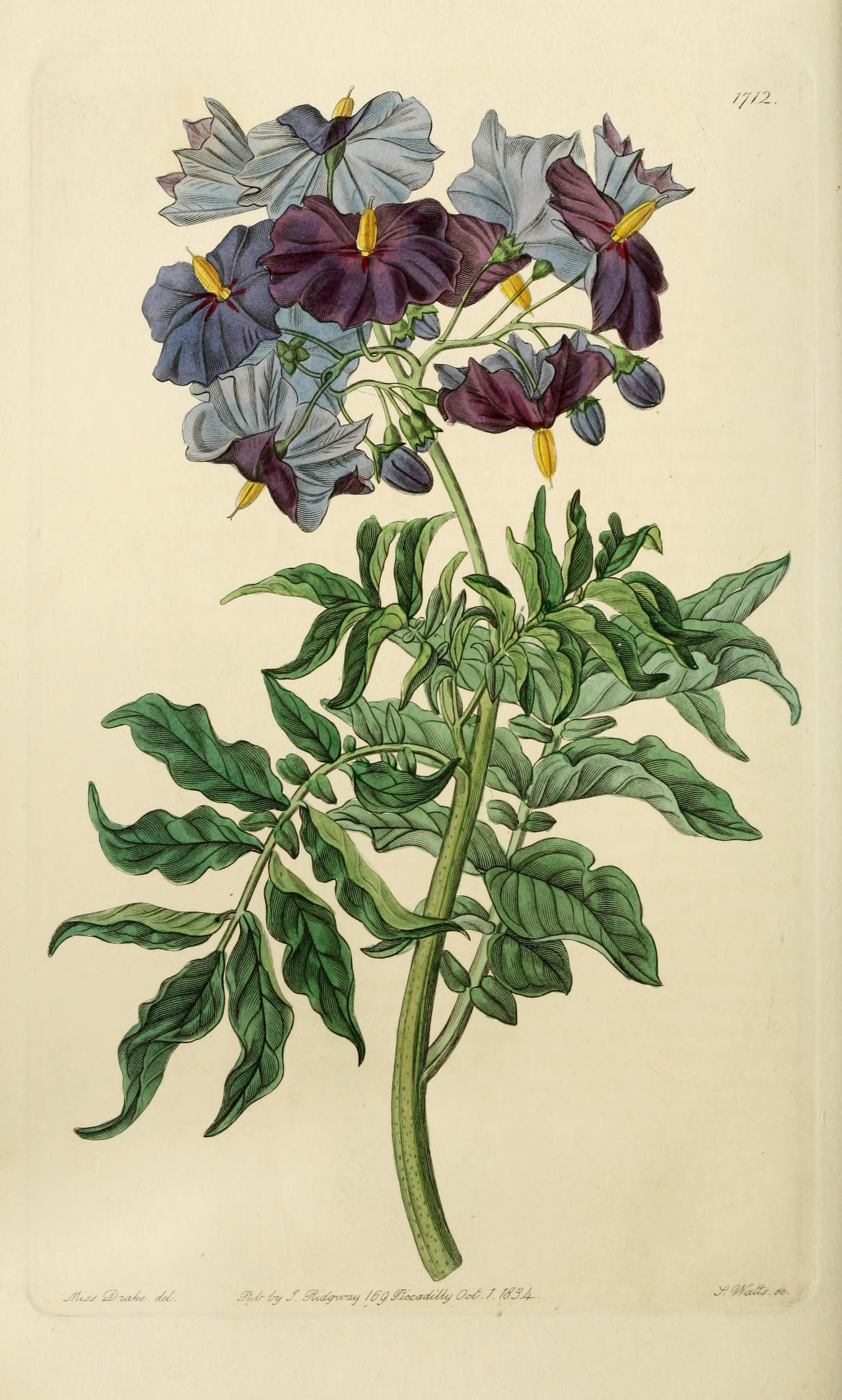
- Botanical illustration
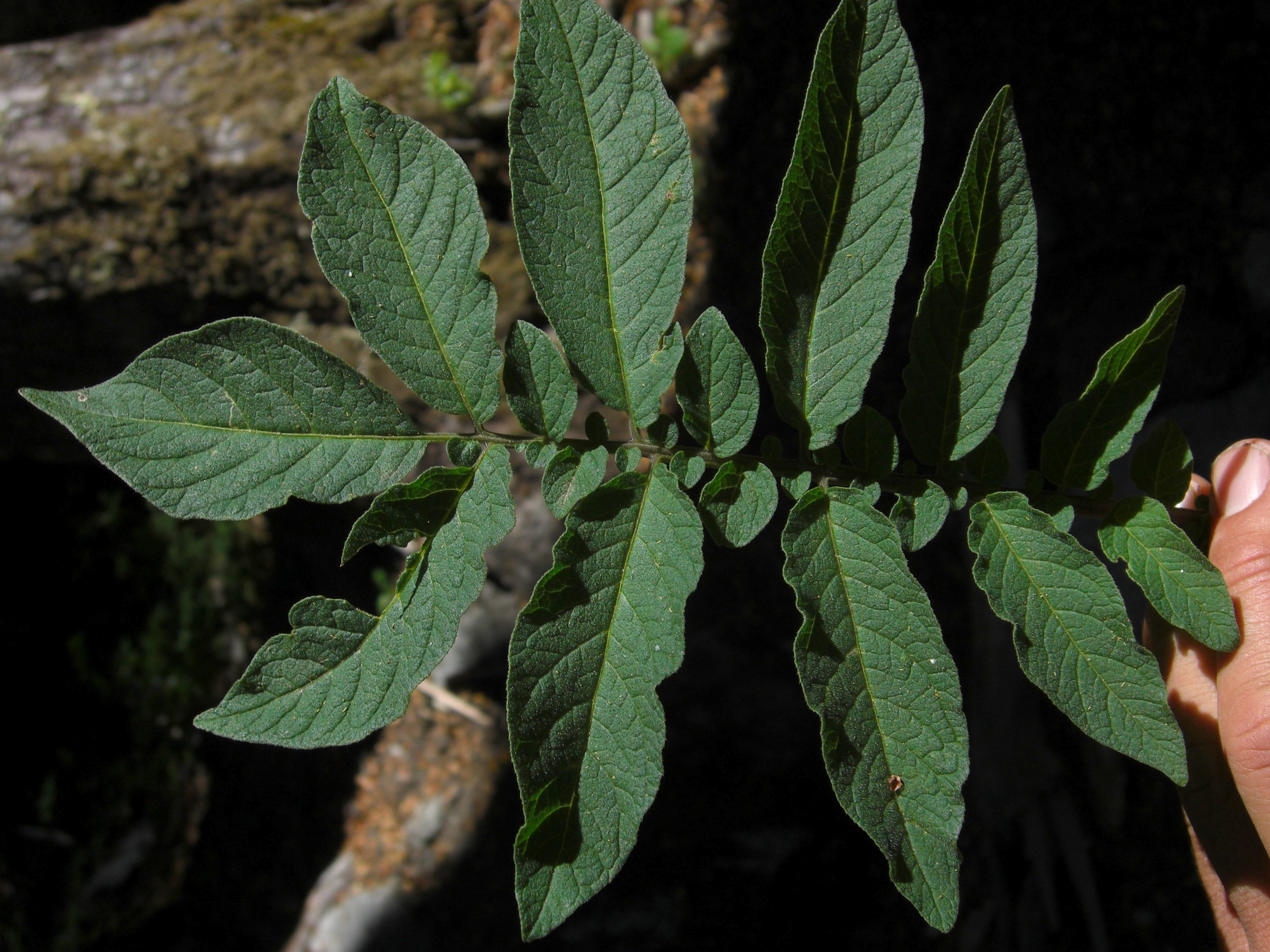
- Leaves

Scientific classification
- Kingdom: Plantae
- Clade: Embryophytes
- Clade: Tracheophytes
- Clade: Angiosperms
- Clade: Eudicots
- Clade: Asterids
- Order: Solanales
- Family: Solanaceae
- Genus: Solanum
- Species: S. etuberosum

Binomial name
- Solanum etuberosum Lindl.

Synonyms
- List: Solanum bustillosii Phil.; Solanum etuberosum var. antucense Bitter; Solanum etuberosum var. bustillosii Witasek; Solanum etuberosum var. chillanense Bitter; Solanum kunzei Phil.; Solanum looseri Juz.; Solanum looseri Juz. ex Bukasov; Solanum subandinum F.Meigen; Solanum tuberosum var. polemoniifolium Hook.f.

= Solanum etuberosum =

Species of plant in the nightshade family

Solanum etuberosum is a species of wild potato in the family Solanaceae, endemic to central Chile. Although it does not bear tubers (or has tubers that are little more than thickened rhizomes), it is still being extensively studied for its resistance to Potato virus Y, Potato leafroll virus, green peach aphids, and frost. Due to its large, showy flowers it may have some use as an ornamental.

According to a 2025 study by Zhang et al., a hybridization event some 9 million years ago between a member of the S. etuberosum lineage and a member of the tomato lineage may have made possible the emergence of tuberous potatoes. The proposed lineage includes S. etuberosum, S. palustre, and S. fernandezianum among other species.
