= Alturas (disambiguation) =

Alturas is a town in Modoc County, California.

Alturas may also refer to:

- Alturas, Florida, an unincorporated community in Polk County, Florida
- Alturas County, Idaho, historical county from 1864 to 1895
- Alturas Lake in Idaho
- Alturas Indian Rancheria, a federally recognized tribe of Achomawi Indians in California
- Alturas (potato)
- Mahindra Alturas G4, a mid-size SUV

== See also ==
- Altura (disambiguation)
