= Russet potato =

Potato variety

A russet potato is a type of potato that is large, with dark brown skin and few eyes. The flesh is white, dry, soft, and mealy, and it is suitable for baking, mashing, and french fries. Russet potatoes are sometimes known as Idaho potatoes in the United States, but the name Idaho Potato is trademarked by the Idaho Potato Commission and only potatoes grown in the state of Idaho can legally be referred to by that name.

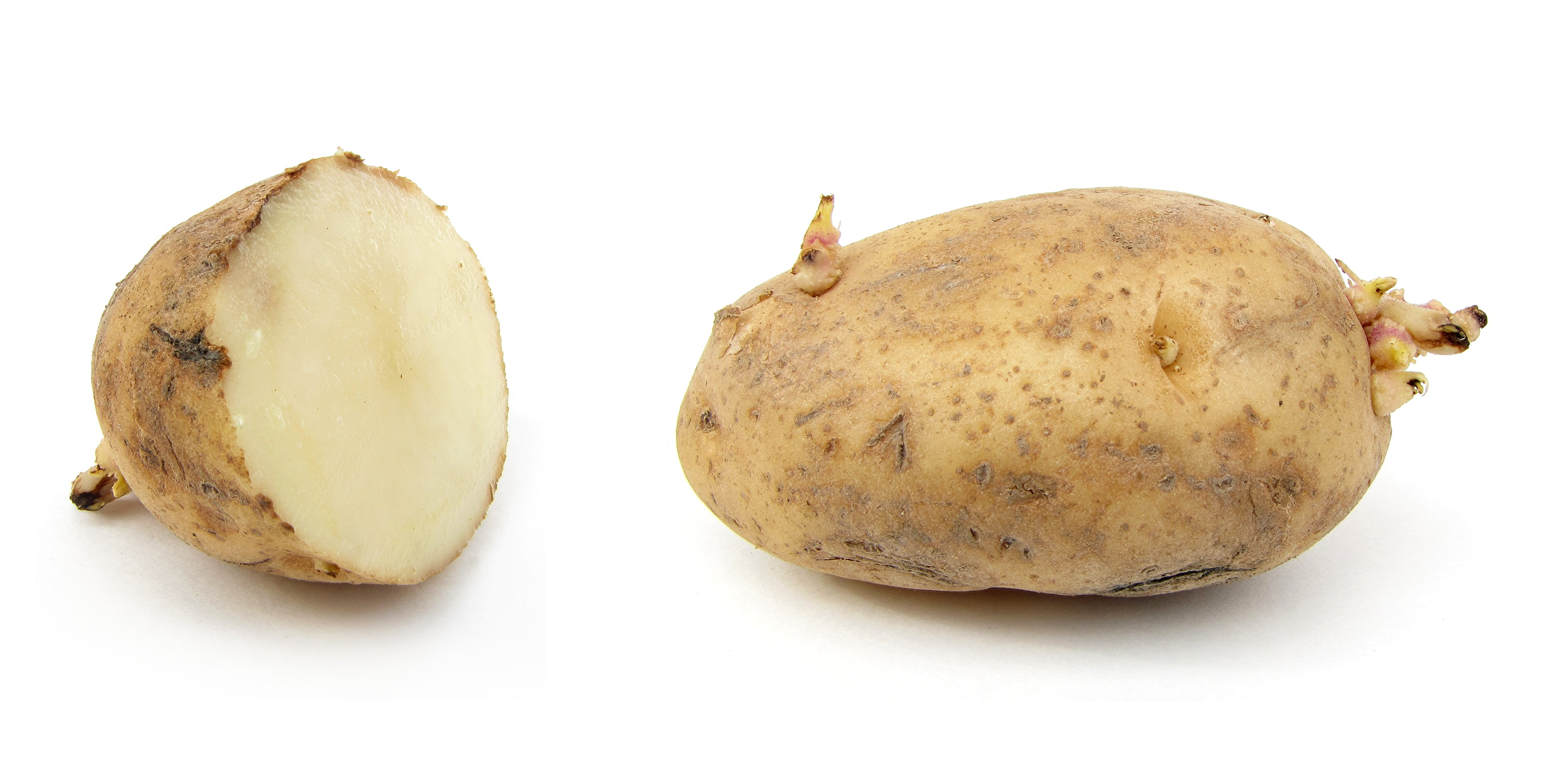
Russet potato cultivar with sprouts

== Varieties ==
- Russet Burbank
- Norkotah Russet
- Frontier Russet
- Russet Nugget
- Centennial Russet
- Rio Grande Russett
- Silverton Russet
- Ranger Russet
- Umatilla Russet
- Butte Russet
- Alpine Russet
- Alturas Russet
- Arcadia Russet
- Blazer Russet
- Canela Russet
- Caribou Russet
- Castle Russet
- Classic Russet
- Clearwater Russet
- Defender Russet
- Echo Russet
- Galena Russet
- Gem Russet
- GemStar Russet
- Highland Russet
- King Russet
- La Belle Russet
- Lemhi Russet
- Mountain Gem Russet
- Nooksack Russet
- Norgold Russet
- Owyhee Russet
- Payette Russet
- Pioneer Russet
- Pomerelle Russet
- Premier Russet
- Reveille Russet
- Rio Grand Russet
- Sage Russet
- Targhee Russet
- Teton Russet
- Vanguard Russet
- Western Russet
- Rainier Russet

== Origin ==
To improve the disease resistance of potatoes, Luther Burbank selected the potato that became known as the Russet Burbank. It was not patented because plants propagated from tubers, such as potatoes, were not granted patents in the United States.

== Use ==
Restaurants such as McDonald's use russet potatoes for their size, which produce long pieces suitable for french fries. As of 2009, "McDonald's top tuber is the Russet Burbank". The russet Burbank is more expensive than other potatoes, as it consumes more water and takes longer to mature, while it also requires large amounts of pesticides.

Varieties with high levels of starch, like russet potatoes, are well-suited to baking and mashing.
