= Cisgenesis =

Category of genetically engineered plant

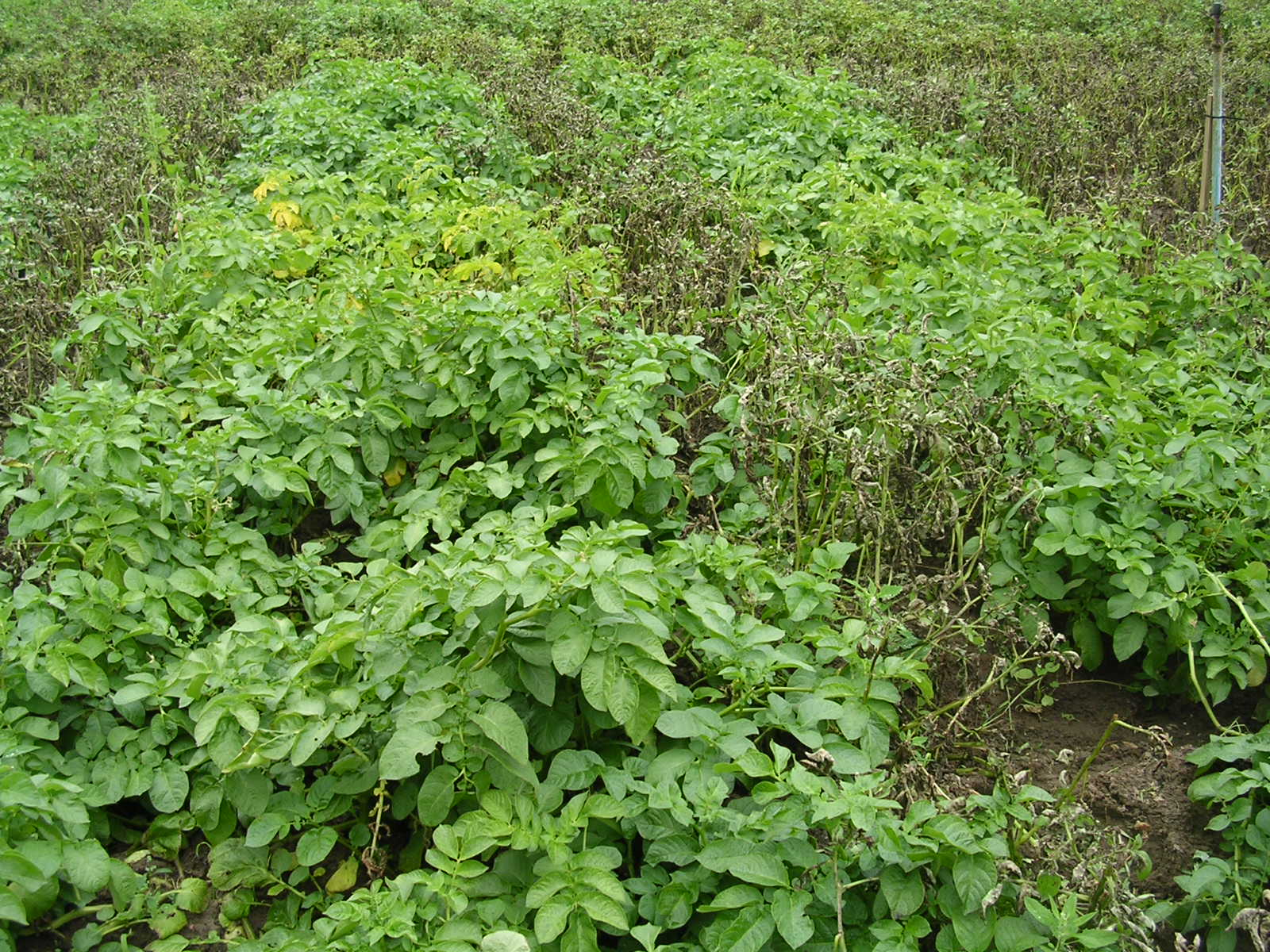
Potatoes after treatment with Phytophthora infestans. The normal potatoes have blight but the cisgenic potatoes are healthy

Cisgenesis is a product designation for a category of genetically engineered plants. A variety of classification schemes have been proposed that order genetically modified organisms based on the nature of introduced genotypical changes, rather than the process of genetic engineering.

Cisgenesis (etymology: cis = same side; and genesis = origin) is one term for organisms that have been engineered using a process in which genes are artificially transferred between organisms that could otherwise be conventionally bred. Genes are only transferred between closely related organisms. Nucleic acid sequences must be isolated and introduced using the same technologies that are used to produce transgenic organisms, making cisgenesis similar in nature to transgenesis. The term was first introduced in 2000 by Henk J. Schouten and Henk Jochemsen, and in 2004 a PhD thesis by Jan Schaart of Wageningen University in 2004, discussing making strawberries less susceptible to Botrytis cinerea.

In Europe, currently, this process is governed by the same laws as transgenesis. While researchers at Wageningen University in the Netherlands feel that this should be changed and regulated in the same way as conventionally bred plants, other scientists, writing in Nature Biotechnology, have disagreed. In 2012 the European Food Safety Authority (EFSA) issued a report with their risk assessment of cisgenic and intragenic plants. They compared the hazards associated with plants produced by cisgenesis and intragenesis with those obtained either by conventional plant breeding techniques or transgenesis. The EFSA concluded that "similar hazards can be associated with cisgenic and conventionally bred plants, while novel hazards can be associated with intragenic and transgenic plants."

Cisgenesis has been applied to transfer of natural resistance genes to the devastating disease Phytophthora infestans in potato and scab (Venturia inaequalis) in apple.

Cisgenesis and transgenesis use artificial gene transfer, which results in less extensive change to an organism's genome than mutagenesis, which was widely used before genetic engineering was developed.

Some people believe that cisgenesis should not face as much regulatory oversight as genetic modification created through transgenesis as it is possible, if not practical, to transfer alleles among closely related species even by traditional crossing. The primary biological advantage of cisgenesis is that it does not disrupt favorable heterozygous states, particularly in asexually propagated crops such as potato, which do not breed true to seed. One application of cisgenesis is to create blight resistant potato plants by transferring known resistance loci wild genotypes into modern, high yielding varieties.

The Dutch government has proposed to exclude cisgenic plants from the European GMO Regulation, in view of the safety of cisgenic plants compared to classically bred plants, and their contribution to durable food production.

== Related classification scheme ==
A related classification scheme proposed by Kaare Nielsen is:

	Source of genetic modification	Genetic variability via conventional breeding	Genetic distance
Intragenic	Within genome	Possible	Low
Famigenic	Species in the same family	Possible	
Linegenic	Species in the same lineage	Impossible	
Transgenic	Unrelated species	Impossible	
Xenogenic	Laboratory-designed genes	Impossible	High

== Diagram ==
A diagram comparing the genetic changes achieved through conventional plant breeding, transgenesis and cisgenesis

.
