= Fluazinam =

Names
- Preferred IUPAC name 3-Chloro-N-[3-chloro-2,6-dinitro-4-(trifluoromethyl)phenyl]-5-(trifluoromethyl)pyridin-2-amine

Identifiers
CAS Number	79622-59-6
3D model (JSmol)	Interactive image
ChEBI	CHEBI:81843
ChemSpider	82831
ECHA InfoCard	100.114.073
PubChem CID	91731
UNII	0P91PCK33Q
CompTox Dashboard (EPA)	DTXSID7032551
- InChI: InChI=1S/C13H4Cl2F6N4O4/c14-6-1-4(12(16,17)18)3-22-11(6)23-9-7(24(26)27)2-5(13(19,20)21)8(15)10(9)25(28)29/h1-3H,(H,22,23) Key: UZCGKGPEKUCDTF-UHFFFAOYSA-N; InChI=1/C13H4Cl2F6N4O4/c14-6-1-4(12(16,17)18)3-22-11(6)23-9-7(24(26)27)2-5(13(19,20)21)8(15)10(9)25(28)29/h1-3H,(H,22,23) Key: UZCGKGPEKUCDTF-UHFFFAOYAY
- SMILES: C1=C(C=NC(=C1Cl)NC2=C(C=C(C(=C2[N+](=O)[O-])Cl)C(F)(F)F)[N+](=O)[O-])C(F)(F)F

Properties
Chemical formula	C_{13}H_{4}Cl_{2}F_{6}N_{4}O_{4}
Molar mass	465.09 g·mol^{−1}
Density	1.8±0.1 g/cm3
Melting point	116 °C (241 °F; 389 K)
Boiling point	376.1±42.0°C (Predicted)
Solubility in water	1.76 mg/L
Vapor pressure	5.51×10^{−8} mmHg (Predicted)

Hazards
- Lethal dose or concentration (LD, LC)
LD_{50} (median dose)	5000mg/kg (rat, oral); 4190mg/kg (mallard, oral) ≥200μg (bee, contact) ≥1000mg/kg (worm, 28 day)
LC_{50} (median concentration)	61ppb (rainbow trout, 96h)
- Except where otherwise noted, data are given for materials in their standard state (at 25 °C [77 °F], 100 kPa). Infobox references

Fluazinam is a broad-spectrum fungicide used in agriculture. It is classed as a diarylamine and more specifically an arylaminopyridine. Its chemical name is 3-chloro-N-(3-chloro-2,6-dinitro-4-trifluoromethylphenyl)-5-trifluoromethyl-2-pyridinamine.

== Mode of action ==
The mode of action involves the compound being an extremely potent uncoupler of oxidative phosphorylation in mitochondria and also having high reactivity with thiols. It is unique amongst uncouplers in displaying broad-spectrum activity against fungi and also very low toxicity to mammals due to it being rapidly metabolised to a compound without uncoupling activity. It was first described in 1992 and was developed by researchers at the Japanese company Ishihara Sangyo Kaisha.

== Uses ==
Fluazinam is a protectant fungicide, but is neither systemic or curative. It acts by inhibiting the germination of spores and the development of infection structures. Although it has activity against many fungi, it is less potent against rusts and powdery mildew and as such has not been commercialised for use in cereal crops. It is widely used to control late blight (P. infestans) in potato due to its activity against the zoospores of the pathogen which makes it particularly effective at controlling infection of the potato tubers. Because of its extensive usage to control late blight in Europe, there are confirmed reports of resistance to fluazinam appearing in P. infestans in genotypes EU_33_A2 and EU_37_A2. Fluazinam is also used to control Sclerotinia on peanuts and turf, Botrytis on grapes and beans and clubroot in brassicas.

== Toxicity ==
The acute oral median lethal dose in rats is very low at over 5000 mg/kg due to the compound's reactivity with thiols. This reactivity can have negative consequences since repeated exposure can cause skin sensitization and dermatitis to develop in some individuals. Fluazinam also displays low toxicity to birds, bees and worms, but has a high toxicity to fish. The toxicity towards fish is considered to be relatively unimportant, since the compound has a very short half-life (around 1 day) in aquatic systems.

== Regulation ==
Pesticide products containing fluazinam have been banned in Denmark because the chemical can degrade into trifluoroacetic acid, which can then contaminate groundwater and not decompose.
