= Altura, Trieste =

Neighbourhood in Trieste, Italy

Coordinates: 45°37′40″N 13°49′8.3″E

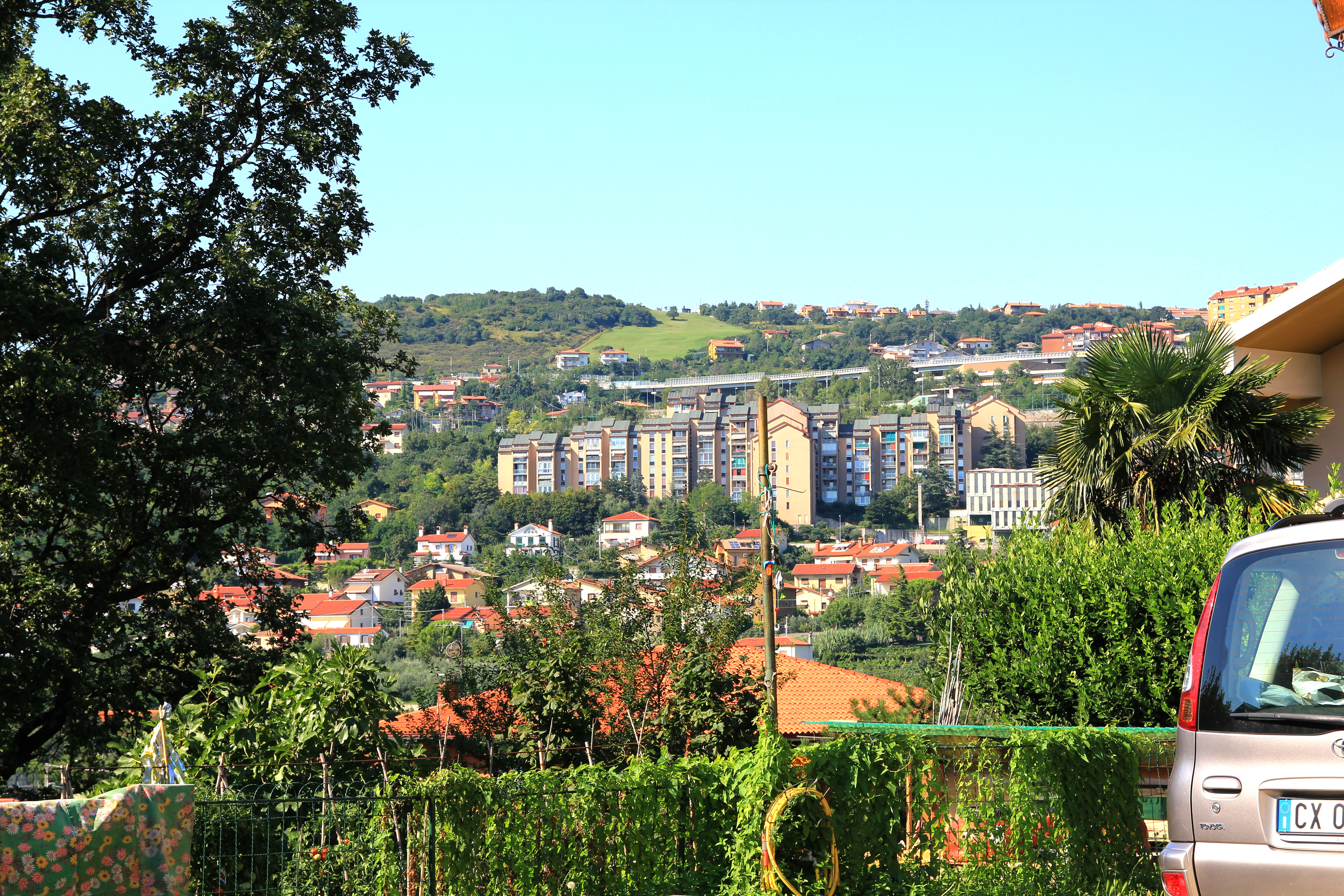
A view of Altura

Altura is a neighbourhood in the town of Trieste, Italy, region of Friuli-Venezia Giulia. It was established in the 1970s, is located circa 10 kilometres (6.2 mi) from the centre of Trieste and has a population of about 3,400 inhabitants.
