= Russet Burbank =

Potato cultivar

Potato 'Russet Burbank'
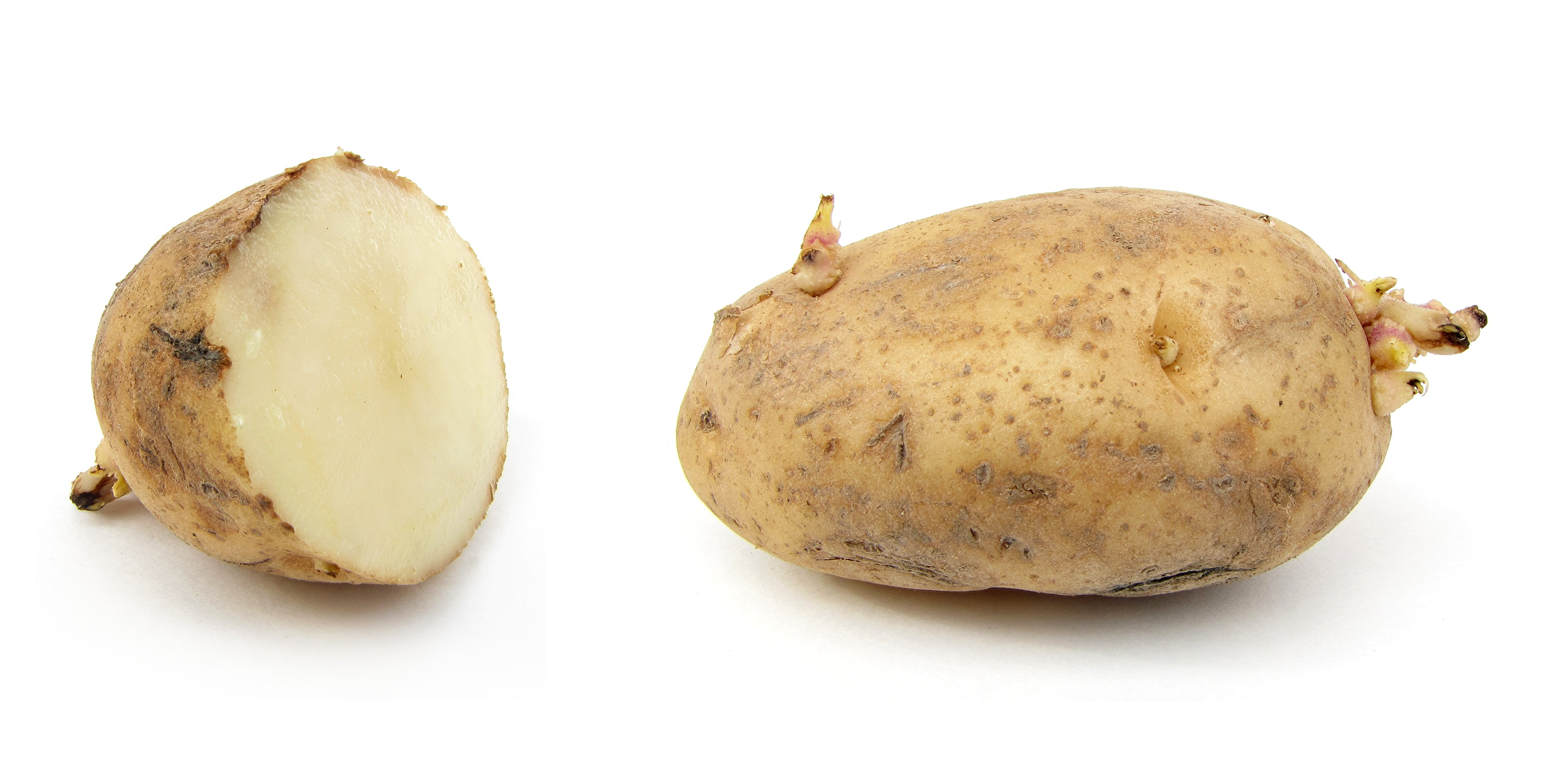
- Genus: Solanum
- Species: S. tuberosum
- Cultivar: 'Russet Burbank'
- Origin: 1902

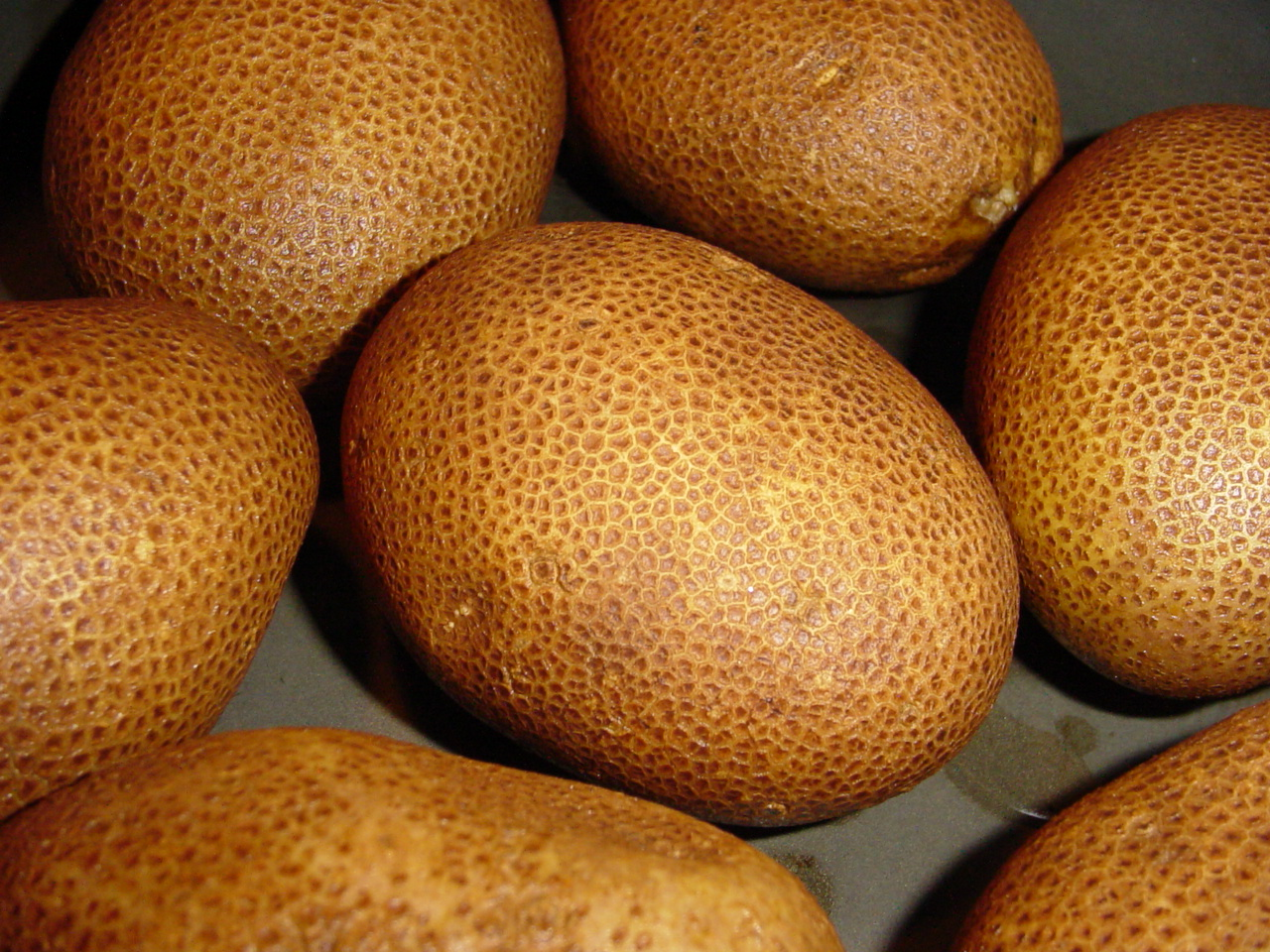
Idaho russet potatoes

Russet Burbank is a potato cultivar with brown skin and few eyes that is the most widely grown potato in North America. A russet type, its flesh is white, dry, and mealy, and it is good for baking, mashing, and french fries (chips). It is a common and popular potato.

== Origin ==
This variety is a mutation of the cultivar 'Burbank's Seedling' that was selected by the plant breeder Luther Burbank in 1873. The known lineage of Russet Burbank began in 1853 when Chauncey E. Goodrich imported the Rough Purple Chili from South America in an attempt to add diversity to American potato stocks which were susceptible to late blight. Goodrich bred Garnet Chili from Rough Purple Chili, and Albert Bresee bred Early Rose from Garnet Chili, from which Luther Burbank bred Burbank. This cross-over was formerly known as the Russell, but was eventually popularized as the Russet potato in the American stores. Russet Burbank has been widely, but incorrectly, reported to have been selected in 1914 by the Colorado potato grower Lou D. Sweet. A 2014 study confirmed that it was originally released in 1902 by L. L. May & Co and was first known as the Netted Gem.

To improve the disease resistance of Irish potatoes, Luther Burbank selected the potato that became known as "the Burbank." It was not patented because plants, such as potatoes, propagated from tubers were not granted patents in the United States.

== Usage ==
Russet Burbank was not initially popular, accounting for only 4% of potatoes in the US in 1930. The introduction of irrigation in Idaho increased its popularity, as growers found it produced large potatoes easily marketed as baking potatoes. The invention of frozen french fries in the '40s and fast food restaurants in the '50s increased its popularity further. By the 2010s, Russet Burbank accounted for 70% of the ultra-processed potato market in North America, and over 40% of the potato growing area in the US.

Restaurants such as McDonald's favor russet potatoes for their size, which produce long pieces suitable for french fries. As of 2009, "McDonald's top tuber is the Russet Burbank." After decades of consumption in North America, consumers and processors consider it the standard potato against which others are judged.

== Botanical features ==
The Russet Burbank plants are medium-sized with stems with a medium thickness that are prominently angled. The leaves of this variety are medium-sized with large terminal and primary leaflets. The plant's flowers are medium-sized with dark green buds that drop readily. The variety has large, long tubers that are cylindrical or slightly flat. There are numerous eyes on the potato that are evenly distributed, and the sprouts are brownish-purple.

== Storage ==
The Russet Burbank variety stores very well for long periods. It can be stored at 7 °C (44.6 °F) for up to five months without the need to apply gasses that inhibit sprouting. One issue that can occur while in storage is an internal black spot, also known as IBS. Also, if the potatoes are harvested too early, there could be a skinning issue.

== Disease resistance ==
Russet Burbank is highly resistant to black leg. It is moderately resistant to common scab and to some forms of fusarium dry rot (Fusarium oxysporum and F. sambucinum). It is susceptible to another form of fusarium dry rot (F. coeruleum), late blight (Phytophthora infestans), leaf roll, seed-piece decay, tuber net necrosis, verticillium wilt, PVX and PVY. Genetically modified potatoes can be resistant to the Colorado Potato Beetle.
