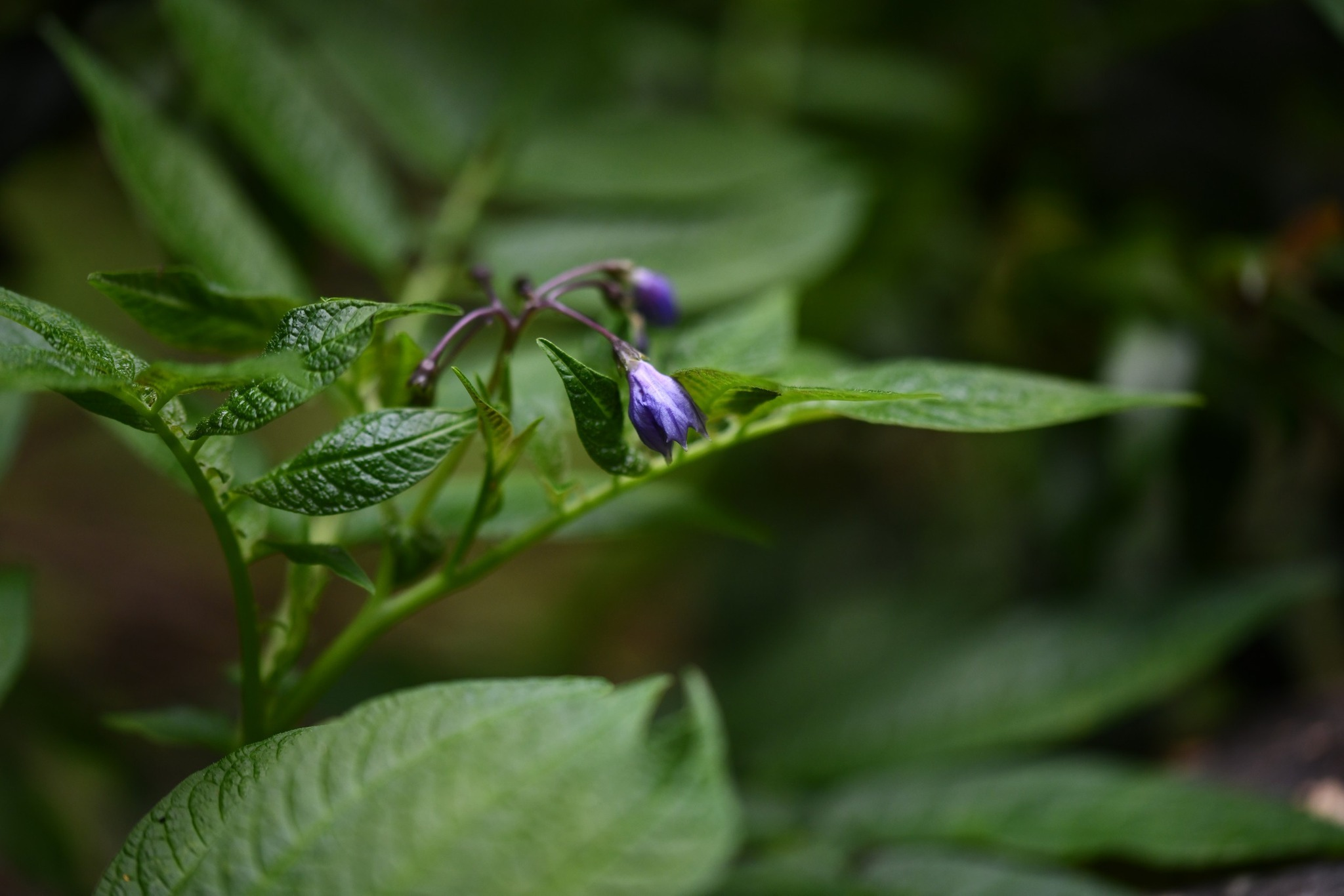

Scientific classification
- Kingdom: Plantae
- Clade: Tracheophytes
- Clade: Angiosperms
- Clade: Eudicots
- Clade: Asterids
- Order: Solanales
- Family: Solanaceae
- Genus: Solanum
- Species: S. fernandezianum

Binomial name
- Solanum fernandezianum Phil.

= Solanum fernandezianum =

Species of plant

Solanum fernandezianum is a species of flowering plant in the family Solanaceae. It is endemic to the Juan Fernández Islands in Chile.
