= Alternaria solani =

Scientific classification
- Kingdom: Fungi
- Division: Ascomycota
- Class: Dothideomycetes
- Order: Pleosporales
- Family: Pleosporaceae
- Genus: Alternaria
- Species: A. solani

Binomial name
- Alternaria solani Sorauer, (1896)

Synonyms
- Alternaria solani (Ellis & G. Martin) L.R. Jones & Grout, Annual Report of the Vermont Agricultural Experimental Station 9: 86 (1896); Macrosporium solani Ellis & G. Martin, Am. Nat. 16(12): 1003 (1882)

Species of fungus

Alternaria solani is a fungal pathogen that produces a disease in tomato and potato plants called early blight. The pathogen produces distinctive "bullseye" patterned leaf spots and can also cause stem lesions and fruit rot on tomato and tuber blight on potato. Despite the name "early", foliar symptoms usually occur on older leaves. If uncontrolled, early blight can cause significant yield reductions. Primary methods of controlling this disease include preventing long periods of wetness on leaf surfaces and applying fungicides. Early blight can also be caused by Alternaria tomatophila, which is more virulent on stems and leaves of tomato plants than Alternaria solani.

Geographically, A. solani is problematic in tomato production areas east of the Rocky Mountains, rather than the drier western United States. A. solani is also present in most potato production regions every year but has a significant effect on yield only when frequent wetting of foliage favors symptom development.

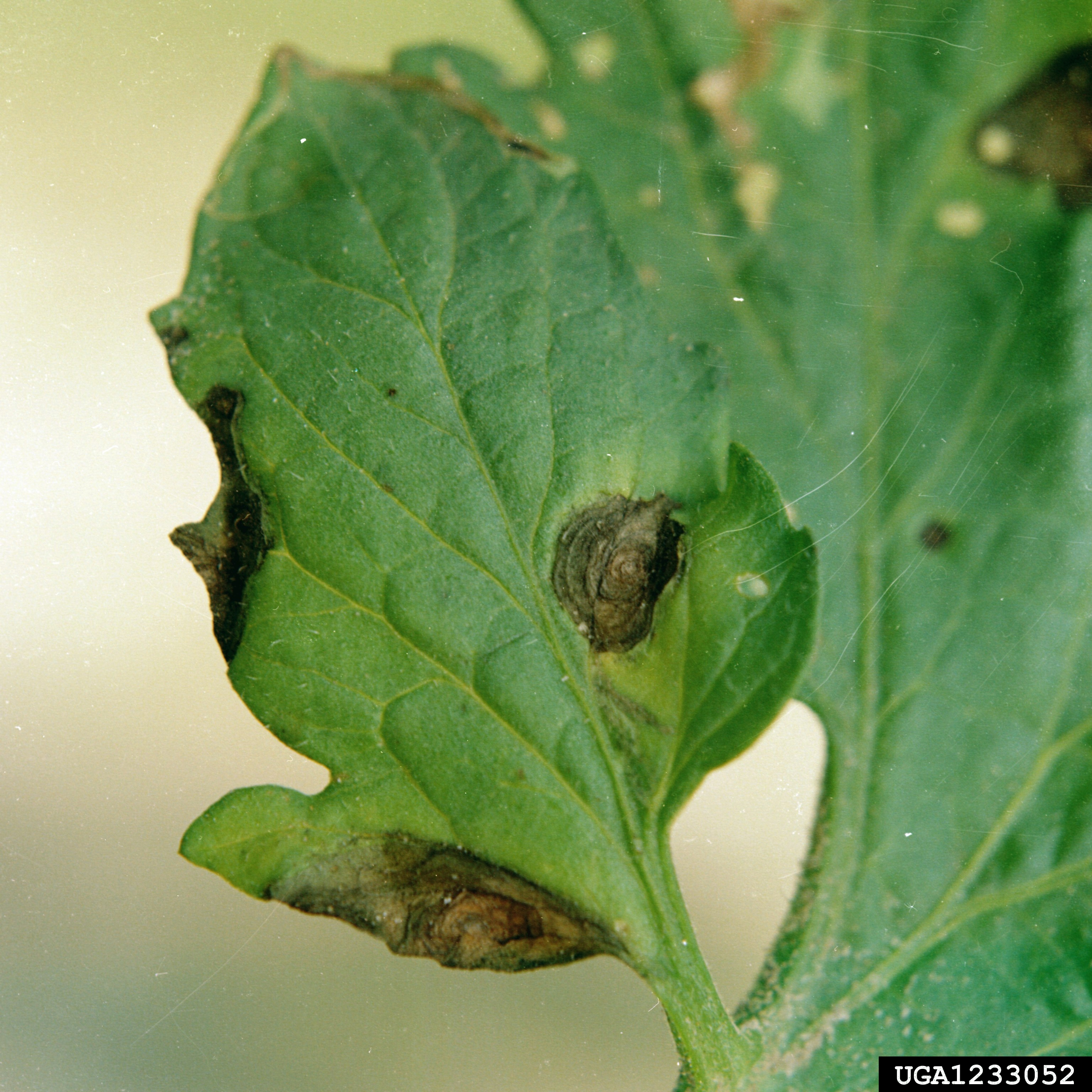
"Bullseye" patterned leaf lesion of Alternaria solani

== Hosts and symptoms ==
Alternaria solani infects stems, leaves and fruits of tomato (Solanum lycopersicum L.), potato (S. tuberosum), eggplant (S. melongena L.), bell pepper and hot pepper (Capsicum spp.), and other members of the family Solanaceae. Distinguishing symptoms of A. solani include leaf spot and defoliation, which are most pronounced in the lower canopy. In some cases, A. solani may also cause damping off.

=== On tomatoes ===
On tomato, foliar symptoms of A. solani generally occur on the oldest leaves and start as small lesions that are brown to black in color. These leaf spots resemble concentric rings – a distinguishing characteristic of the pathogen – and measure up to 1.3 cm (0.51 in) in diameter. Both the area around the leaf spot and the entire leaf may become yellow or chlorotic. Under favorable conditions (e.g., warm weather with short or abundant dews), significant defoliation of lower leaves may occur, leading to sunscald of the fruit. As the disease progresses, symptoms may migrate to the plant stem and fruit. Stem lesions are dark, slightly sunken and concentric in shape. Seedlings can develop small, dark, partially sunken lesions which grow and elongate into circular or oblong lesions. Basal girdling and death of seedlings may occur, a symptom known as collar rot. In fruit, A. solani invades at the point of attachment to the stem as well as through growth cracks and wounds made by insects, infecting large areas of the fruit Fruit spots are similar in appearance to those on leaves – brown with dark concentric circles. Mature lesions are typically covered by a black, velvety mass of fungal spores that may be visible under proper light conditions.

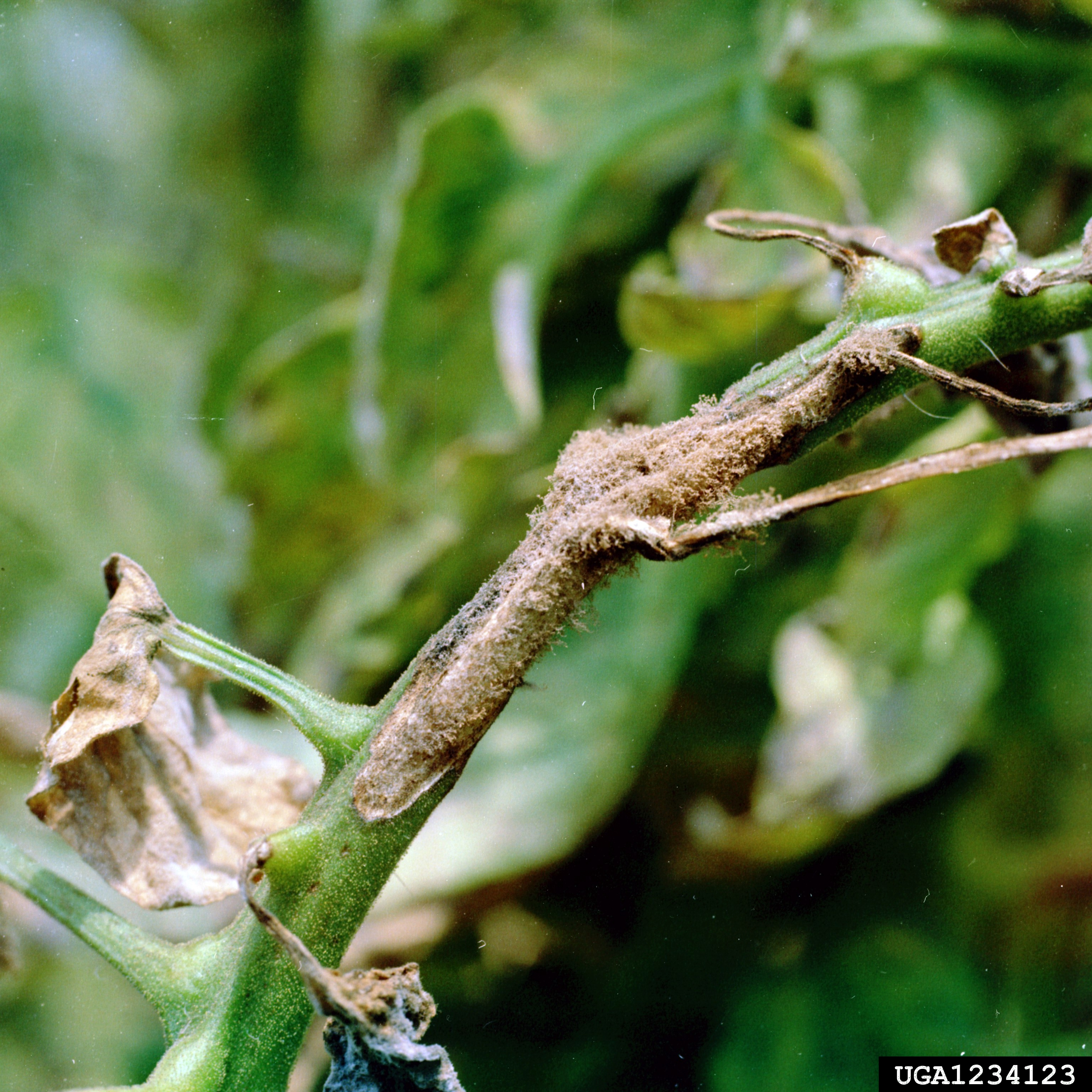
Stem lesion of Alternaria solani

=== On potatoes ===
In potato, primary damage by A. solani is attributed to premature defoliation of potato plants, which results in tuber yield reduction. Initial infection occurs on older leaves, with concentric dark brown spots developing mainly in the leaf center. The disease progresses during the period of potato vegetation, and infected leaves turn yellow and either dry out or fall off the stem. On stems, spots are gaunt with no clear contours (as compared to leaf spots). Tuber lesions are dry, dark and pressed into the tuber surface, with the underlying flesh turning dry, leathery and brown. During storage, tuber lesions may enlarge and tubers may become shriveled. Disease severity due to A. solani is highest when potato plants are injured, under stress or lack proper nutrition. High levels of nitrogen, moderate potassium and low phosphorus in the soil can reduce susceptibility of infection by the pathogen.

== Disease cycle ==
Alternaria solani is a deuteromycete with a polycyclic life cycle. Alternaria solani reproduces asexually by means of conidia. A.solani is generally considered to be a necrotrophic pathogen, i.e. it kills the host tissue using cell wall degrading enzymes and toxins and feeds on the dead plant cell material

The life cycle starts with the fungus overwintering in crop residues or wild members of the family Solanaceae, such as black nightshade. In the spring, conidia are produced. Multicellular conidia are splashed by water or by wind onto an uninfected plant. The conidia infect the plant by entering through small wounds, stomata, or direct penetration. Infections usually start on older leaves close to the ground. The fungus takes time to grow and eventually forms a lesion. From this lesion, more conidia are created and released. These conidia infect other plants or other parts of the same plant within the same growing season. Every part of the plant can be infected and form lesions. This is especially important when fruit or tubers are infected as they can be used to spread the disease.

In general, development of the pathogen can be aggravated by an increase in inoculum from alternative hosts such as weeds or other solanaceous species. Disease severity and prevalence are highest when plants are mature.

== Environment ==
Alternaria solani spores are universally present in fields where host plants have been grown.

Free water is required for Alternaria spores to germinate; spores will be unable to infect a perfectly dry leaf. Alternaria spores germinate within 2 hours over a wide range of temperatures but at 26.6–29.4 °C (79.9–84.9 °F) may only take 1/2 hour. Another 3 to 12 hours are required for the fungus to penetrate the plant depending on temperature. After penetration, lesions may form within 2–3 days or the infection can remain dormant awaiting proper conditions [15.5 °C (59.9 °F) and extended periods of wetness]. Alternaria sporulates best at about 26.6 °C (79.9 °F) when abundant moisture (as provided by rain, mist, fog, dew, irrigation) is present. Infections are most prevalent on poorly nourished or otherwise stressed plants.

== Management ==
=== Cultural control ===
- Clear infected debris from field to reduce inoculum for the next year.
- Water plants in the morning so plants are wet for the shortest amount of time.
- Use a drip irrigation system to minimize leaf wetness. Wet leaves provide optimal conditions for fungal growth.
- Use mulch so spores that were already in the soil are blocked from splashing onto the leaves.
- Rotate to a non-solanaceous crop for at least three years. The more potato-free years, the less infection.
- If possible control wild population of Solanaceae. This will decrease the amount of inoculum to infect your plants.
- Closely monitor the field, especially in warm damp weather when it grows fastest, to reduce loss of crop and spray fungicide in time.
- Plant resistant cultivars.
- Increase air circulation in rows. Damp conditions allow for optimal growth of A. solani and the disease spreads more rapidly. Better air circulation can be achieved by planting farther apart or by trimming leaves.

=== Chemical control ===
There are numerous fungicides on the market for controlling early blight. Some of the fungicides on the market are (azoxystrobin), pyraclostrobin, Bacillus subtilis, chlorothalonil, copper products, hydrogen dioxide (Hydroperoxyl), mancozeb, potassium bicarbonate, and ziram. Specific spraying regiments are found on the label. Labels for these products should be read carefully before applying.

Quinone outside inhibitor (QoIs) fungicides e.g. azoxystrobin are used due to their broad-spectrum activity. However, decreased fungicide sensitivity has been observed in A. solanidue to a F129L (Phenylalanine (F) changed to Leucine at position 129) amino acid substitution.

== Economic significance ==
Early blight caused by A. solani is the most destructive disease of tomatoes in the tropical and subtropical regions. Each 1% increase in intensity can reduce yield by 1.36%, and complete crop failure can occur when the disease is most severe. Yield losses of up to 79% have been reported in the U.S., of which 20–40% is due to seedling losses (i.e., collar rot) in the field.

A. solani is also one of the most important foliar pathogens of potato. In the U.S., yield loss estimates attributed to foliar damage, which results in decreased tuber quality and yield reduction, can reach 20-30%. In storage, A. solani can cause dry rot of tubers and may also reduce storage length, both of which diminish the quantity and quality of marketable tubers.

Because A. solani is one of numerous tomato/potato pathogens that are typically controlled with the same products, accurately estimating both the total economic loss and the total expenditure on fungicides for control of early blight is difficult. Best estimates suggest that total annual global expenditures on fungicide control of A. solani is approximately $77 million: $32 million for tomatoes and $45 million for potatoes.

== Historical impact ==
Though the causal pathogen is distributed worldwide and can cause crop yield reductions, early blight has never caused widespread famine or other sudden and major detrimental effects on humanity. The disease is not to be confused with late blight, which is caused by the oomycete Phytophthora infestans. Late blight disease together with the socio-economic situation at the time was responsible for the Great Famine of Ireland in the 1840s.
