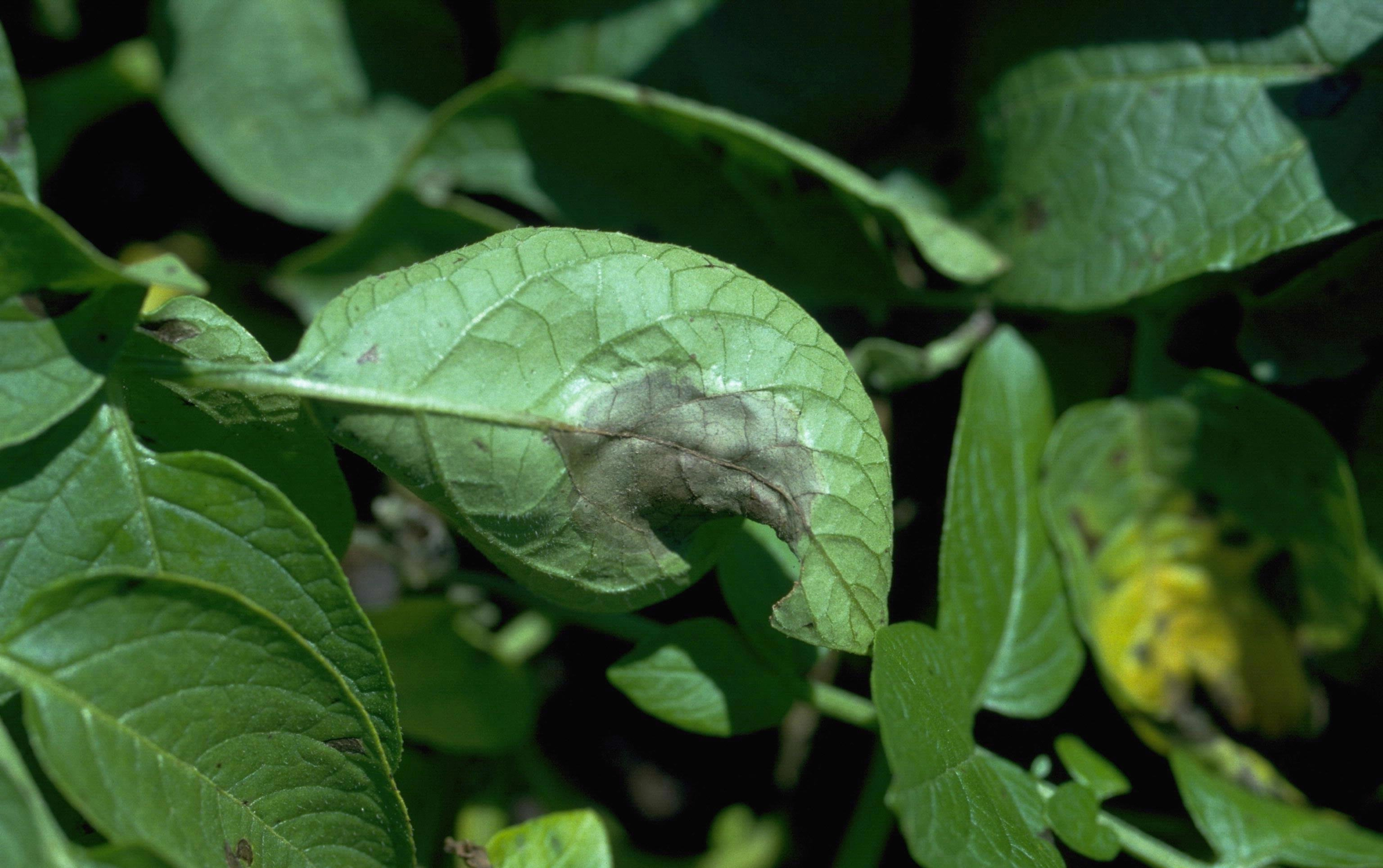
- Symptom of late blight on the underside of a potato leaf

Scientific classification
- Domain: Eukaryota
- Supergroup: Stramenopiles
- Division: Oomycota
- Class: Peronosporomycetes
- Order: Peronosporales
- Family: Peronosporaceae
- Genus: Phytophthora
- Species: P. infestans

Binomial name
- Phytophthora infestans (Mont.) de Bary

= Phytophthora infestans =

Species of single-celled organism

Phytophthora infestans is an oomycete or water mold, a fungus-like microorganism (oomycete) that causes the serious crop disease known as late blight or potato blight. The Early blight caused by Alternaria solani is also often called "potato blight". Despite its resemblance to true fungi, morphological and molecular classification places this organism among the Stramenopiles; as their cell walls are made of cellulose instead of chitin, and they reproduce through swimming spores, they are evolutionary and functionally closer to algae and diatoms.

The organism infects various members of the Solanaceae family, such as the potato (Solanum tuberosum) and the tomato. The pathogen favors moist, cool environments: sporulation is optimal at 12–18 °C (54–64 °F) in water-saturated or nearly saturated environments, and zoospore production is favored at temperatures below 15 °C (59 °F). Lesion growth rates are typically optimal at a slightly warmer temperature range of 20 to 24 °C (68 to 75 °F). Historically, late blight was a major factor in the 1840s European, the 1845–1852 Irish, and the 1846 Highland potato famines.

== Etymology ==
The genus name Phytophthora comes from the Greek φυτόν (phyton), meaning 'plant' – plus the Greek φθορά (phthora), meaning 'decay, ruin, perish'. The species name infestans is the present participle of the Latin verb infestare, meaning 'attacking, destroying', from which the word "to infest" is derived. The name Phytophthora infestans was coined in 1876 by the German mycologist Heinrich Anton de Bary (1831–1888).

== Life cycle, signs and symptoms ==
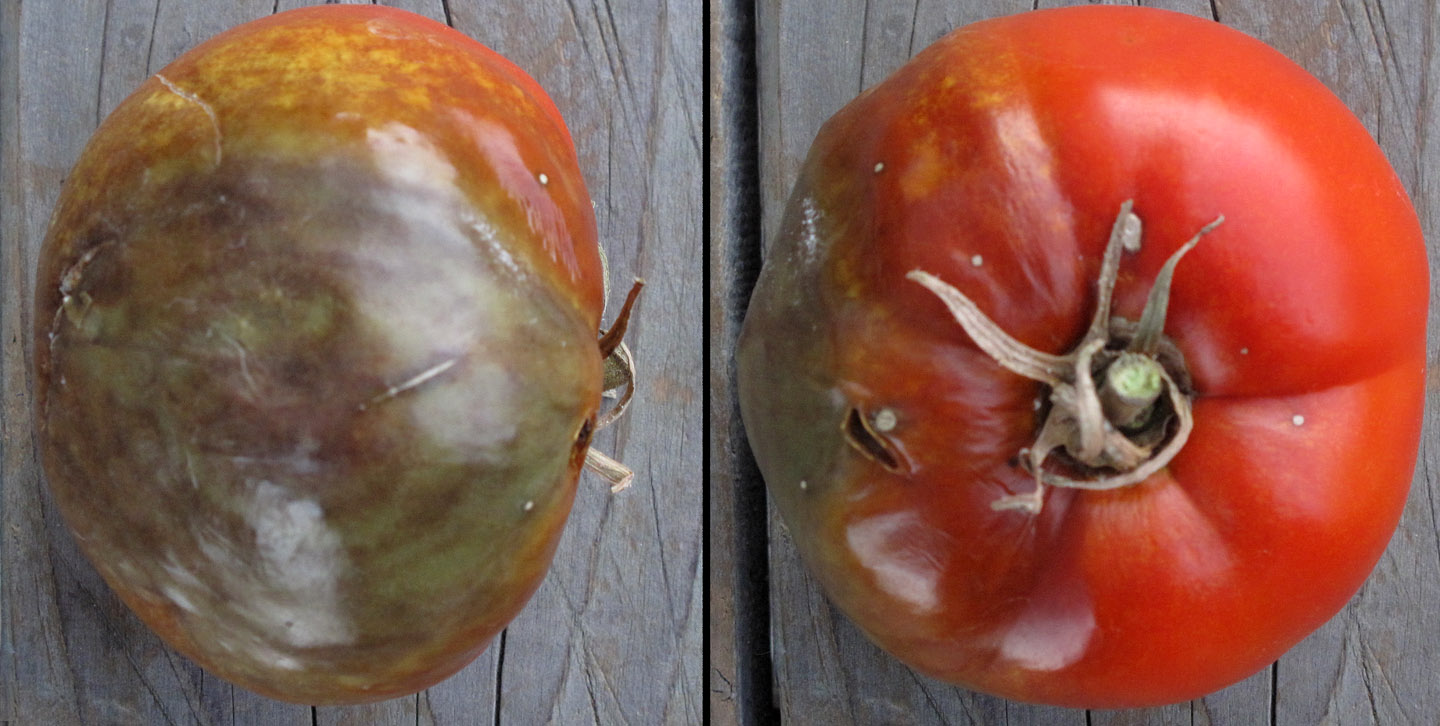

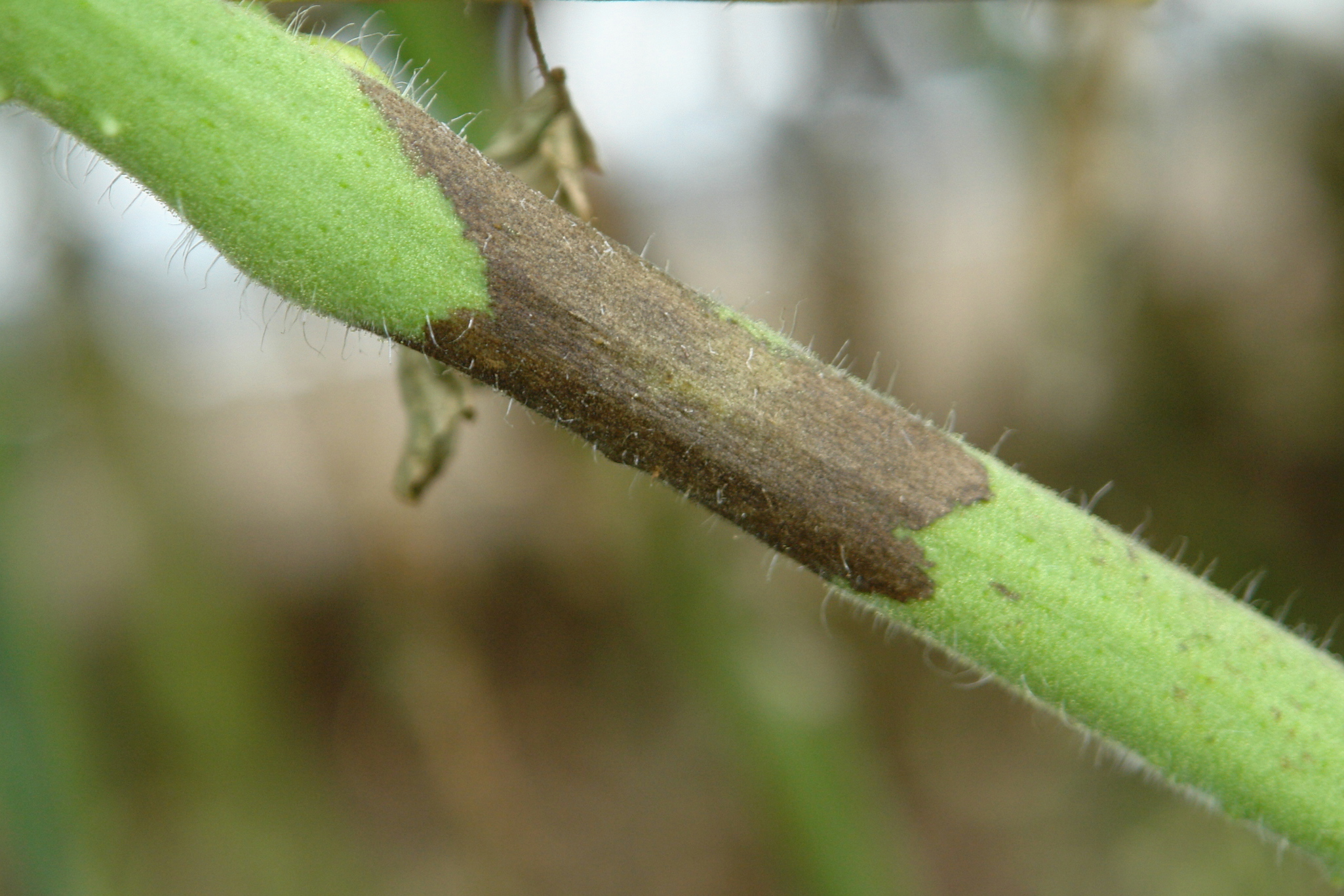

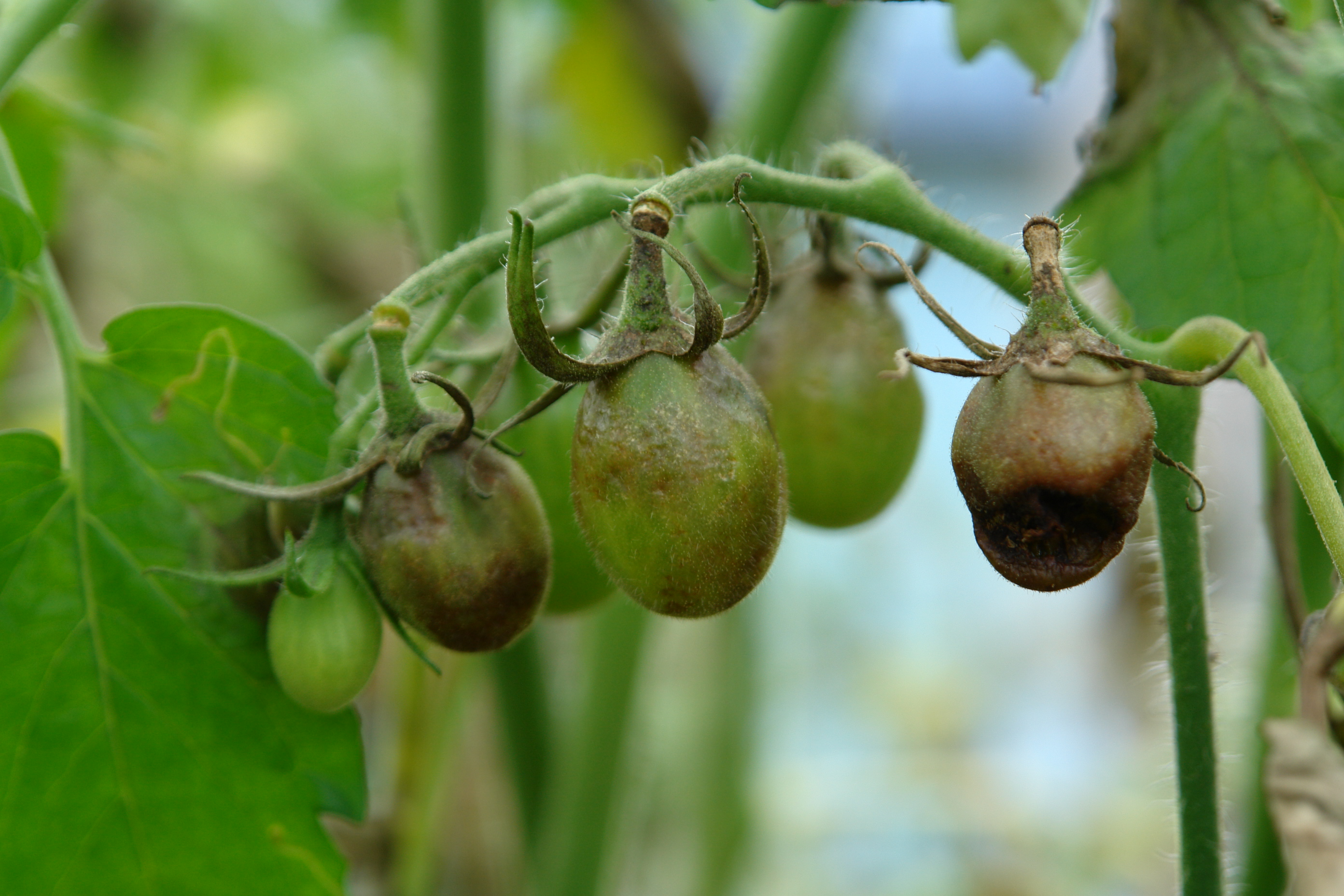

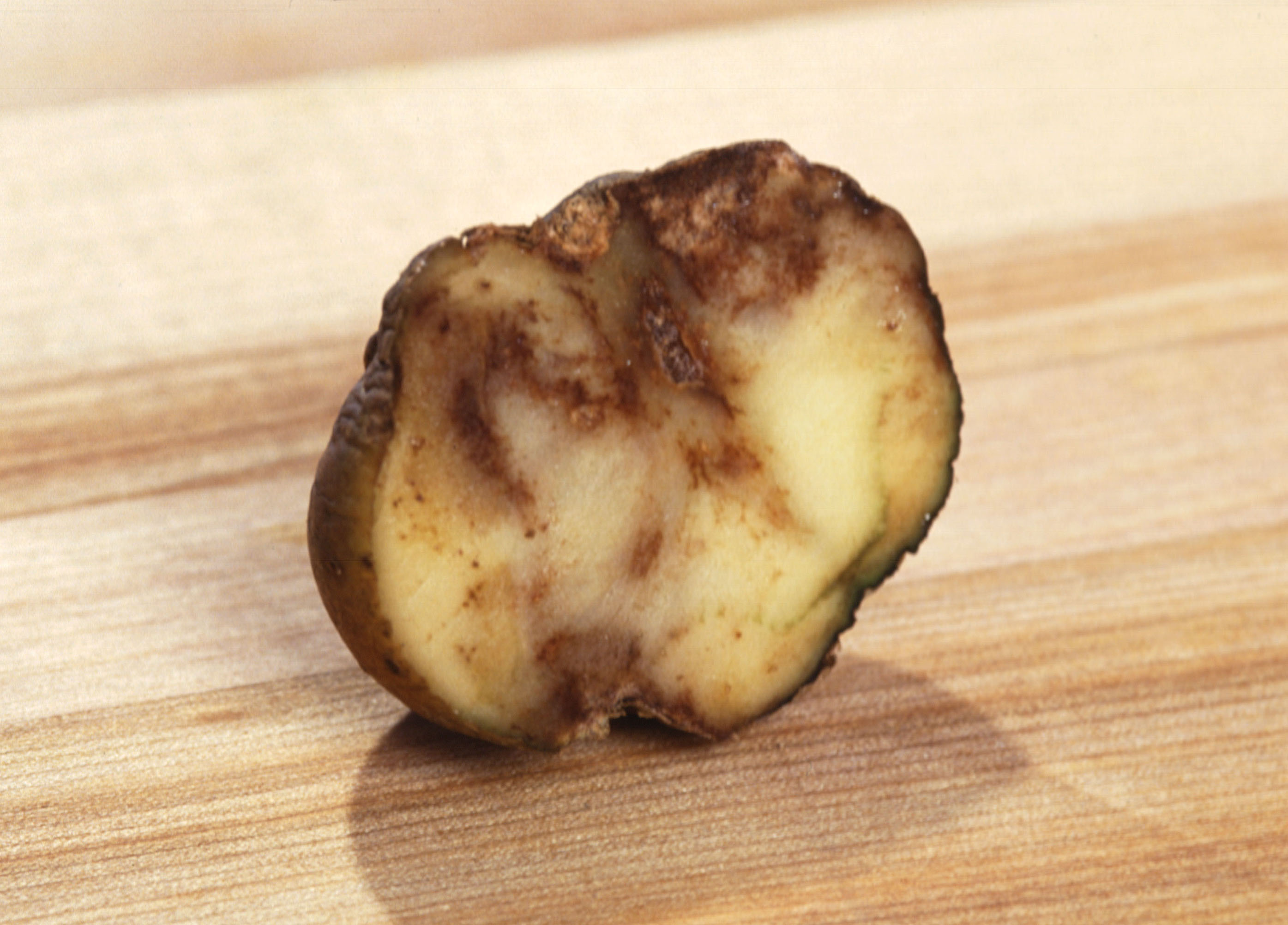
Infected potato

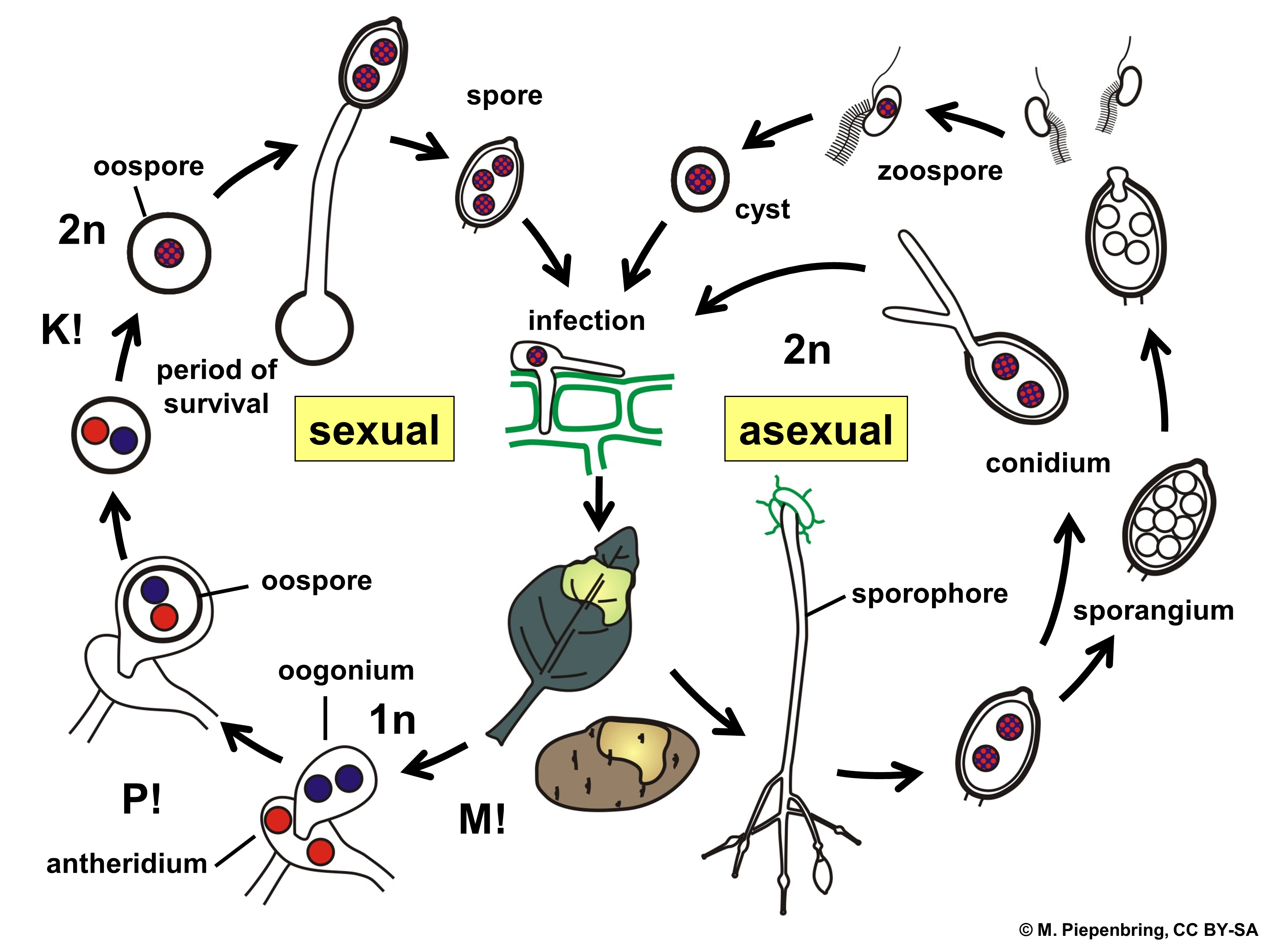
Life cycle on potato

The asexual life cycle of Phytophthora infestans is characterized by alternating phases of hyphal growth, sporulation, sporangia germination (either through zoospore release or direct germination, i.e. germ tube emergence from the sporangium), and the re-establishment of hyphal growth. There is also a sexual cycle, which occurs when isolates of opposite mating type (A1 and A2, see § Mating types below) meet. Hormonal communication triggers the formation of the sexual spores, called oospores. The different types of spores play major roles in the dissemination and survival of P. infestans. Sporangia are spread by wind or water and enable the movement of P. infestans between different host plants. The zoospores released from sporangia are biflagellated and chemotactic, allowing further movement of P. infestans on water films found on leaves or soils. Both sporangia and zoospores are short-lived, in contrast to oospores which can persist in a viable form for many years.

People can observe P. infestans produce dark green, then brown then black spots on the surface of potato leaves and stems, often near the tips or edges, where water or dew collects. The sporangia and sporangiophores appear white on the lower surface of the foliage. As for tuber blight, the white mycelium often shows on the tubers' surface.

Under ideal conditions, P. infestans completes its life cycle on potato or tomato foliage in about five days. Sporangia develop on the leaves, spreading through the crop when temperatures are above 10 °C (50 °F) and humidity is over 75–80% for 2 days or more. Rain can wash spores into the soil where they infect young tubers, and the spores can also travel long distances on the wind. The early stages of blight are easily missed. Symptoms include the appearance of dark blotches on leaf tips and plant stems. White mold will appear under the leaves in humid conditions and the whole plant may quickly collapse. Infected tubers develop grey or dark patches that are reddish brown beneath the skin, and quickly decay to a foul-smelling mush caused by the infestation of secondary soft bacterial rots. Seemingly healthy tubers may rot later when in store.

P. infestans survives poorly in nature apart from on its plant hosts. Under most conditions, the hyphae and asexual sporangia can survive for only brief periods in plant debris or soil, and are generally killed off during frosts or very warm weather. The exceptions involve oospores, and hyphae present within tubers. The persistence of viable pathogen within tubers, such as those that are left in the ground after the previous year's harvest or left in cull piles is a major problem in disease management. In particular, volunteer plants sprouting from infected tubers are thought to be a major source of inoculum (or propagules) at the start of a growing season. This can have devastating effects by destroying entire crops.

=== Mating types ===
The mating types are broadly divided into A1 and A2. Until the 1980s populations could only be distinguished by virulence assays and mating types, but since then more detailed analysis has shown that mating type and genotype are substantially decoupled. These types each produce a mating hormone of their own. Pathogen populations are grouped into clonal lineages of these mating types and includes:

==== A1 ====
A1 produces a mating hormone, a diterpene α1. Clonal lineages of A1 include:

- CN-1CN-1, -2, -4, -5, -6, -7, -8 – mtDNA haplotype Ia, China in 1996–97
- CN-3 – Ia, China, 1996–97
- CN-10 – Ia, China, 2004
- CN-11 – IIb, China, 2000 & 2002
- CN01 – IIa, China, 2004–09
- CN03 – Ia/IIb, China, 2004–09
- FAM-1 – (only presumed to be A1), mtDNA haplo Ia subtype HERB-1, Japan, Philippines, India, China, Malaysia, Nepal, present some time before 1950
- IN-1 – Ia, India, Nepal, 1993
- IN-2 – Ia, India, 1993
- JP-2JP-2/SIB-1/RF006 – mtDNA haplo IIa, distinguishable by RG57, intermediate level of metalaxyl resistance, Japan, China, Korea, Thailand, 1996–present
- JP-3 – IIa, distinguishable by RG57, intermediate level of metalaxyl resistance, Japan, 1996–present
- JP-4 – IIa, distinguishable by RG57, intermediate level of metalaxyl resistance, Japan, 1996–present
- KR-1 Zhang sensu Zhang (not to be confused with #KR-1 sensu Gotoh below) – IIa, Korea, 2002–04
- KR_1_A1KR_1_A1 – mtDNA haplo unknown, Korea, 2009–16
- MO-6 – Ia, China, 2004
- NP-1 – Ia, India, Nepal, 1993, 1996–97
- NP-2 – Ia, Nepal, 1997
- NP1 – Ia, Nepal, 1999–2000
- NP2 A1 – (Also A2, see #the A2 type of NP2 below) Ia, Nepal, 1999–2000
- NP3 (not to be confused with #US-1 below) – Ib, Nepal, 1999–2000
- US-1 (not to be confused with #NP3/US-1 above) – Ib, China, India, Nepal, Japan, Taiwan, Thailand, Vietnam, 1940–2000
- NP4, 5, 7, and 9 – Ia, Nepal, 1999–2000
- NP6 – mtDNA haplo unknown, Nepal, 1999–2000
- US-11 – IIb, Taiwan, Korea, Vietnam, 1998–2016
- US-16 – IIb, China, 2002 & 2004
- US-17 – IIa, Korea, 2003–04
- US-23
- US-24
- EU_2_A1 – Ia, Indonesia, 2016–19
- T30-4 - reference laboratory strain subject to first genome sequence
- EU_43_A1 - becoming widespread in Europe after first sampling in 2018. Resistance emerged to two key fungicides.

==== A2 ====
Discovered by John Niederhauser in the 1950s, in the Toluca Valley in Central Mexico, while working for the Rockefeller Foundation's Mexican Agriculture Program. Published in Niederhauser 1956. A2 produces a mating hormone α2. Clonal lineages of A2 include:

- CN02 – See #13_A2/CN02 below
- US-22 – with mtDNA haplotype H-20
- JP-1 – IIa, Japan, Korea, Indonesia, late 1980s–present
- KR-1 Gotoh sensu Gotoh (not to be confused with #KR-1 sensu Zhang above) – IIa, differs from JP-1 by one RG57 band, Korea, 1992
- KR_2_A2 – mtDNA haplo unknown, Korea, 2009–16
- CN-9 – Ia, China, 2001
- NP2 A2 – (Also A1, see #the A1 type of NP2 above) Ia, Nepal, 1999–2000
- NP8 – Ib, Nepal, 1999–2000
- NP10 & 11 – Ia, Nepal, 1999–2000
- TH-1 – Ia, Thailand, China, Nepal, 1994 & 1997
- Unknown – Ib, India, 1996–2003
- BR-1 – Brazil
- US-7
- US-8
- US-14 – IIa, Korea, 2002–03
- EU_13_A2/CN02 – Ia, China, India, Bangladesh, Nepal, Pakistan, Myanmar, 2005–19
- EU_36_A2 - Widespread in Europe since first reported in 2014

==== Self-fertile ====
A self-fertile type was present in China between 2009 and 2013.

== Physiology ==
PiINF1 is the INF1 in P. infestans. Hosts respond with autophagy upon detection of this elicitor, Liu et al. 2005 finding this to be the only alternative to mass hypersensitivity leading to mass programmed cell death.

== Genetics ==
P. infestans is diploid, with about 8–10 chromosomes, and in 2009 scientists completed the sequencing of its genome. The genome was found to be considerably larger (240 Mbp) than that of most other Phytophthora species whose genomes have been sequenced; P. sojae has a 95 Mbp genome and P. ramorum had a 65 Mbp genome. About 18,000 genes were detected within the P. infestans genome. It also contained a diverse variety of transposons and many gene families encoding for effector proteins that are involved in causing pathogenicity. These proteins are split into two main groups depending on whether they are produced by the water mold in the symplast (inside plant cells) or in the apoplast (between plant cells). Proteins produced in the symplast included RXLR proteins, which contain an arginine-X-leucine-arginine (where X can be any amino acid) sequence at the amino terminus of the protein. Some RXLR proteins are avirulence proteins, meaning that they can be detected by the plant and lead to a hypersensitive response which restricts the growth of the pathogen. P. infestans was found to encode around 60% more of these proteins than most other Phytophthora species. Those found in the apoplast include hydrolytic enzymes such as proteases, lipases and glycosylases that act to degrade plant tissue, enzyme inhibitors to protect against host defence enzymes and necrotizing toxins. Overall the genome was found to have an extremely high repeat content (around 74%) and to have an unusual gene distribution in that some areas contain many genes whereas others contain very few.

The pathogen shows high allelic diversity in many isolates collected in Europe. This may be due to widespread trisomy or polyploidy in those populations.

== Research ==
Study of P. infestans presents sampling difficulties in the United States. It occurs only sporadically and usually has significant founder effects due to each epidemic starting from introduction of a single genotype.

== Origin and diversity ==
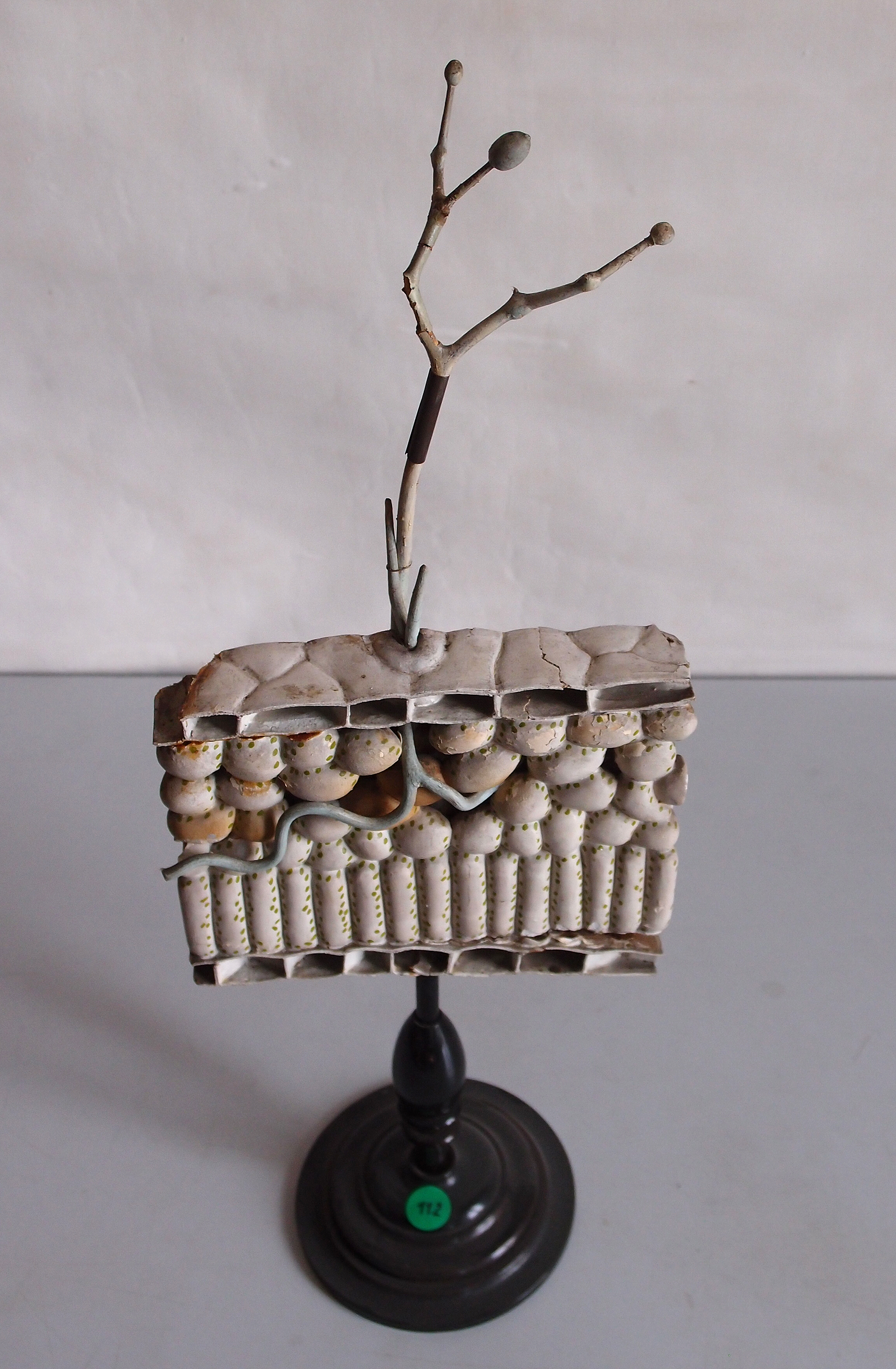
Histological model of a potato leaf cross-section, Botanical Museum Greifswald

The highlands of central Mexico were considered to be the center of origin of P. infestans, although others have proposed its origin to be in the Andes, which is also the origin of potatoes. A study published in 2014 evaluated these two alternate hypotheses and found conclusive support for central Mexico being the center of origin. However, their study did not include either an extensive global sampling of P. infestans or historic genomes. Support for a Mexican origin – specifically the Toluca Valley – came from multiple observations including the fact that populations are genetically most diverse in Mexico, late blight is observed in native tuber-bearing Solanum species, populations of the pathogen are in Hardy–Weinberg equilibrium, the two mating (see § Mating types above) types occur in a 1:1 ratio, and detailed phylogeographic and evolutionary studies. For instance, while sexual recombination is regarded as evidence for a Mexican origin, P. infestans is mostly asexual and does not widely engage in sexual reproduction, despite the migration of the A2 mating type into Europe. Furthermore, the sister lineages of P. infestans, namely P. mirabilis and P. ipomoeae are endemic to central Mexico.

Others have proposed an Andean origin for Phytophthora infestans. In 2002, Ristaino assessed the evidence for both the Mexican and South American origin hypotheses [24]. She pointed to the absence of potato exports during the 1840s, which posed a challenge to the notion of a Mexican origin for the blight's migration to the US and Europe [24]. Furthermore, historical accounts of a similar disease in the Andean region and the presence of the cosmopolitan US-1 lineage in South America since at least the 1980s (yet absent in Mexico) were invoked by Ristaino, potentially supporting the idea of a South American origin [24]. In 2016, the Ristaino lab with collaborators Mike Martin and Tom Gilbert, at the University of Copenhagen, conducted the largest whole genome sequencing project to date with historic and modern day lineages of P infestans (25). Analysis of these more extensive genomic dataset that included both P. infestans and P. andina isolates documented an Andean origin of the species [25]. Lineages of Andean origin were found to be more closely related to historical P. infestans lineages from the famine era, implying an Andean origin with later subsequent migration and diversification occurring in Mexican lineages [25]. Significant admixture between the historic P infestans and P andina was also documented [25]. Several close relatives of P infestans have been found in the Andes in South America, including P. andina, P urerae and P betacei.

Coomber et al., examined the evolutionary history of Phytophthora infestans and its close relatives in the 1c clade using whole genome sequence data from 69 isolates of Phytophthora species in the 1c clade and conducted a range of genomic analyses including nucleotide diversity evaluation, maximum likelihood trees, network assessment, time to most recent common ancestor and migration analysis [26}. They consistently identified distinct and later divergence of the two Mexican Phytophthora species, P. mirabilis and P. ipomoeae, from P. infestans and other 1c clade species. Phytophthora infestans exhibited more recent divergence from other 1c clade species of Phytophthora from South America, P. andina and P. betacei. Speciation in the 1c clade and evolution of P. infestans occurred in the Andes. P. andina – P. betacei – P. infestans formed a species complex with indistinct species boundaries, hybridizations between the species, and short times to common ancestry. Furthermore, the distinction between modern Mexican and South American P. infestans proved less discrete, suggesting gene flow between populations over time. Admixture analysis indicated a complex relationship among these populations, hinting at potential gene flow across these regions. Historic P. infestans, collected from 1845-1889 from herbarium collections, were the first to diverge from all other P. infestans populations. Modern South American populations diverged next followed by Mexican populations which showed later ancestry. Both populations were derived from historic P. infestans. Based on the time of divergence of P. infestans from its closest relatives, P. andina and P. betacei in the Andean region, the data support the Andes as the center of origin of P. infestans, with modern globalization contributing to admixture between P. infestans populations today from Mexico, the Andes and Europe [26].

Migrations from Mexico to North America or Europe have occurred several times throughout history, probably linked to the movement of tubers. Until the 1970s, the A2 mating type was restricted to Mexico, but now in many regions of the world both A1 and A2 isolates can be found in the same region. The co-occurrence of the two mating types is significant due to the possibility of sexual recombination and formation of oospores, which can survive the winter. Only in Mexico and Scandinavia, however, is oospore formation thought to play a role in overwintering. In other parts of Europe, increasing genetic diversity has been observed as a consequence of sexual reproduction. This is notable since different forms of P. infestans vary in their aggressiveness on potato or tomato, in sporulation rate, and sensitivity to fungicides. Variation in such traits also occurs in North America, however importation of new genotypes from Mexico appears to be the predominant cause of genetic diversity, as opposed to sexual recombination within potato or tomato fields. In 1976 – due to a summer drought in Europe – there was a potato production shortfall and so eating potatoes were imported to fill the shortfall. It is thought that this was the vehicle for mating type A2 to reach the rest of the world. In any case, there had been little diversity, consisting of the US-1 strain, and of that only one type of: mating type, mtDNA, restriction fragment length polymorphism, and di-locus isozyme. Then in 1980 suddenly greater diversity and A2 appeared in Europe. In 1981 it was found in the Netherlands, United Kingdom, 1985 in Sweden, the early 1990s in Norway and Finland, 1996 in Denmark, and 1999 in Iceland. In the UK new A1 lineages only replaced the old lineage by end of the '80s, and A2 spread even more slowly, with Britain having low levels and Ireland (north and Republic) having none-to-trace detections through the '90s. Many of the strains that appeared outside of Mexico since the 1980s have been more aggressive, leading to increased crop losses. In Europe since 2013 the populations have been tracked by the EuroBlight network (see links below). Some of the differences between strains may be related to variation in the RXLR effectors that are present.

== Disease management ==
P. infestans is still a difficult disease to control. There are many chemical options in agriculture for the control of damage to the foliage as well as the fruit (for tomatoes) and the tuber (for potatoes). A few of the most common foliar-applied fungicides are Ridomil, a Gavel/SuperTin tank mix, and Previcur Flex. All of the aforementioned fungicides need to be tank mixed with a broad-spectrum fungicide, such as mancozeb or chlorothalonil, not just for resistance management but also because the potato plants will be attacked by other pathogens at the same time.

If adequate field scouting occurs and late blight is found soon after disease development, localized patches of potato plants can be killed with a desiccant (e.g. paraquat) through the use of a backpack sprayer. This management technique can be thought of as a field-scale hypersensitive response similar to what occurs in some plant-viral interactions whereby cells surrounding the initial point of infection are killed in order to prevent proliferation of the pathogen.

If infected tubers make it into a storage bin, there is a very high risk to the storage life of the entire bin. Once in storage, there is not much that can be done besides emptying the parts of the bin that contain tubers infected with Phytophthora infestans. To increase the probability of successfully storing potatoes from a field where late blight was known to occur during the growing season, some products can be applied just prior to entering storage (e.g., Phostrol).

Around the world the disease causes around $6 billion of damage to crops each year.

=== Resistant plants ===
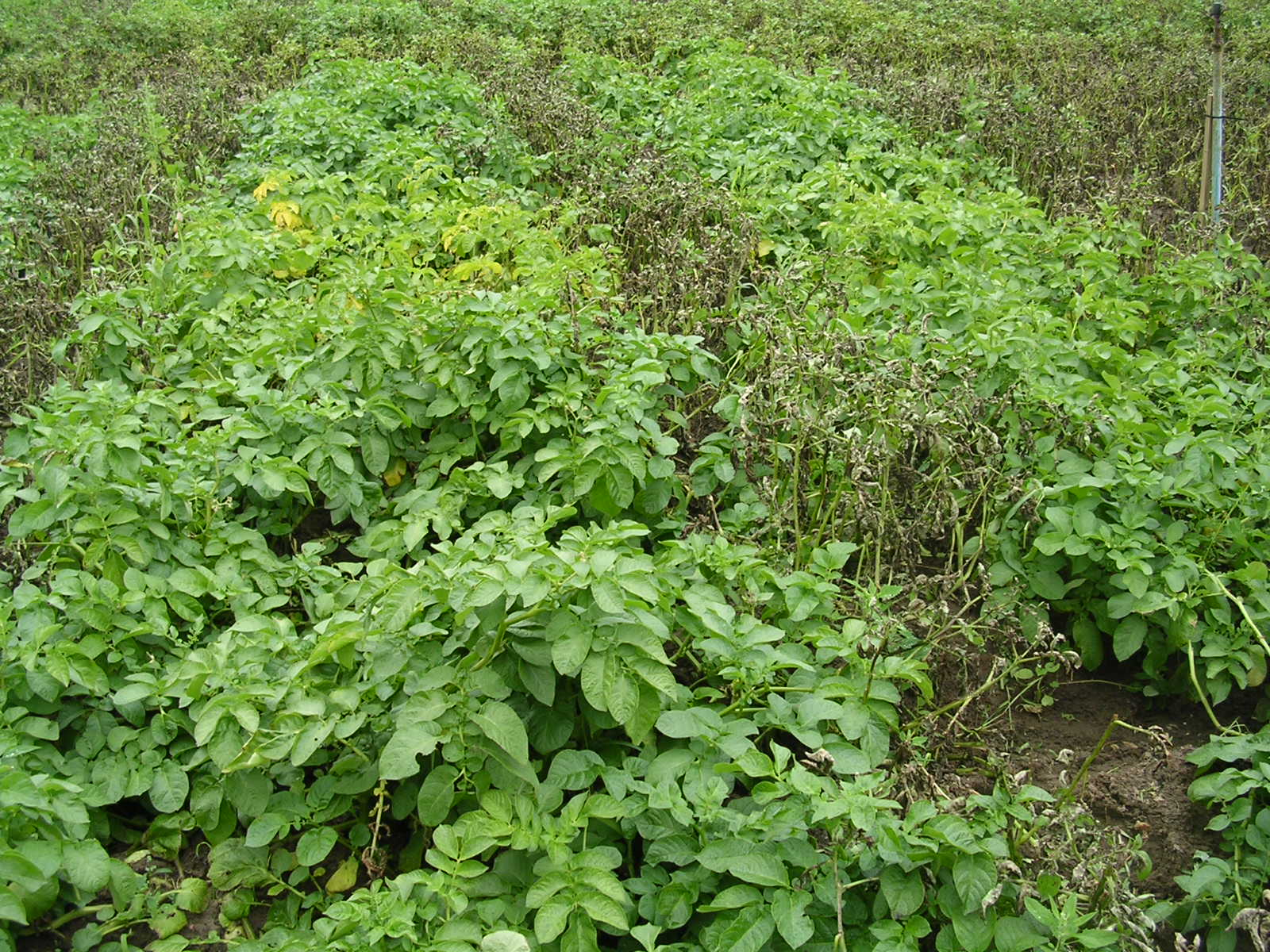
Potatoes after exposure. The normal potatoes have blight but the cisgenic potatoes are healthy.

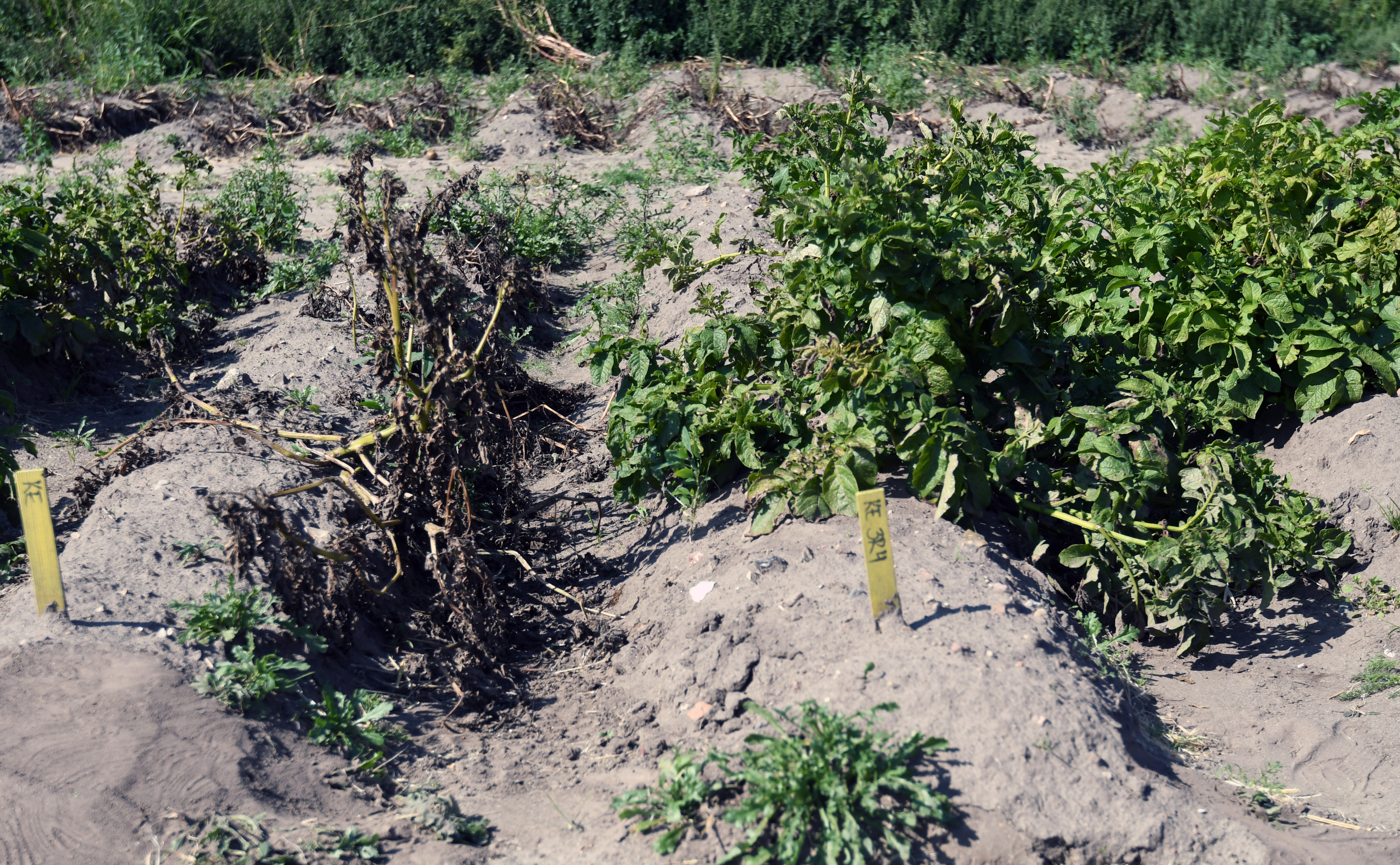
Genetically modified King Edward (right) next to King Edward which has not been genetically modified (left). Research field, Swedish University of Agricultural Sciences, 2019

Breeding for resistance, particularly in potato plants, has had limited success in part due to difficulties in crossing cultivated potato with its wild relatives, which are the source of potential resistance genes. In addition, most resistance genes work only against a subset of P. infestans isolates, since effective plant disease resistance results only when the pathogen expresses a RXLR effector gene that matches the corresponding plant resistance (R) gene; effector-R gene interactions trigger a range of plant defenses, such as the production of compounds toxic to the pathogen.

Potato and tomato varieties vary in their susceptibility to blight. Most early varieties are very vulnerable; they should be planted early so that the crop matures before blight starts (usually in July in the Northern Hemisphere). Many old crop varieties, such as King Edward potato, are also very susceptible but are grown because they are wanted commercially. Maincrop varieties which are very slow to develop blight include Cara, Stirling, Teena, Torridon, Remarka, and Romano. Some so-called resistant varieties can resist some strains of blight and not others, so their performance may vary depending on which are around. These crops have had polygenic resistance bred into them, and are known as "field resistant". New varieties, such as Sarpo Mira and Sarpo Axona, show great resistance to blight even in areas of heavy infestation. Defender is an American cultivar whose parentage includes Ranger Russet and Polish potatoes resistant to late blight. It is a long white-skinned cultivar with both foliar and tuber resistance to late blight. Defender was released in 2004.

Genetic engineering may also provide options for generating resistance cultivars. A resistance gene effective against most known strains of blight has been identified from a wild relative of the potato, Solanum bulbocastanum, and introduced by genetic engineering into cultivated varieties of potato. This is an example of cisgenic genetic engineering.

Melatonin in the plant/P. infestans co-environment reduces the stress tolerance of the parasite.

=== Reducing inoculum ===
Blight can be controlled by limiting the source of inoculum. Only good-quality seed potatoes and tomatoes obtained from certified suppliers should be planted. Often discarded potatoes from the previous season and self-sown tubers can act as sources of inoculum.

Compost, soil or potting medium can be heat-treated to kill oomycetes such as Phytophthora infestans. The recommended sterilisation temperature for oomycetes is 120 °F (49 °C) for 30 minutes.

=== Environmental conditions ===
Warm temperatures, high humidity and damp conditions are conducive to P. infestans. In the 1920s, Dutch scientists developed a set of meteorological conditions after which blight was likely to occur and when fungicides should be applied to prevent an epidemic. These conditions were adapted in the UK and Ireland in the late 1940s and early 1950s. By the 1970s more sophisticated systems, such as BLITECAST, developed in the United States, gave farmers tailored advice.

- A Beaumont Period is a period of 48 consecutive hours, in at least 46 of which the hourly readings of temperature and relative humidity at a given place have not been less than 10 °C (50 °F) and 75%, respectively.
- A Smith Period is at least two consecutive days where min temperature is 10 °C (50 °F) or above and on each day at least 11 hours when the relative humidity is greater than 90%.

The Beaumont and Smith periods have traditionally been used by growers in the United Kingdom, with different criteria developed by growers in other regions. The Smith period was the preferred system used in the UK since its introduction in the 1970s but since 2017, forecasts have used the slightly adapted Hutton Criteria.

Based on these conditions and other factors, several tools have been developed to help growers manage the disease and plan fungicide applications. Often these are deployed as part of decision support systems accessible through web sites or smart phones.

Several studies have attempted to develop systems for real-time detection via flow cytometry or microscopy of airborne sporangia collected in air samplers. Whilst these methods show potential to allow detection of sporangia in advance of occurrence of detectable disease symptoms on plants, and would thus be useful in enhancing existing decision support systems, none have been commercially deployed to date.

=== Use of fungicides ===
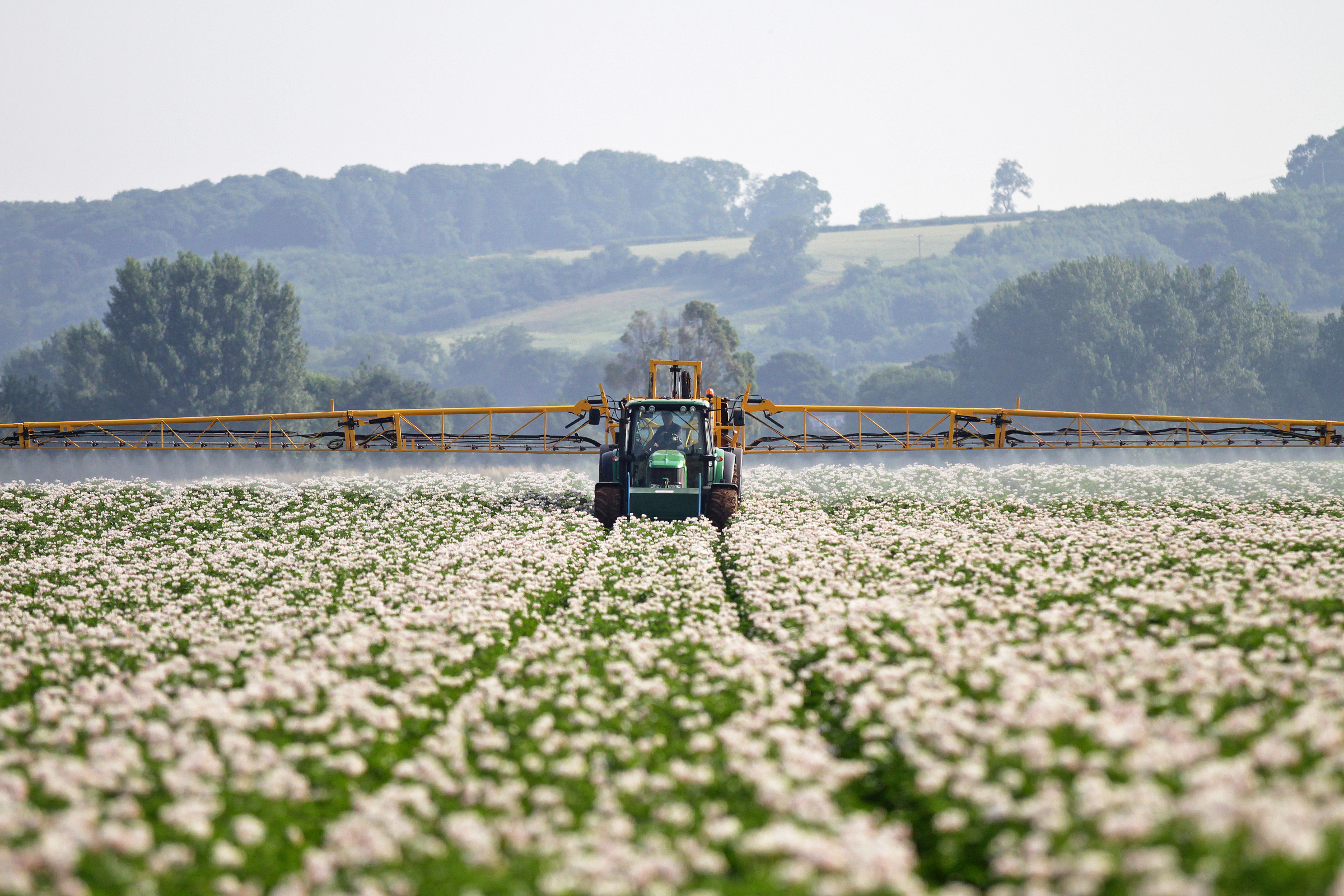
Spraying potato, Nottinghamshire

Fungicides for the control of potato blight are normally used only in a preventative manner, optionally in conjunction with disease forecasting. In susceptible varieties, sometimes fungicide applications may be needed weekly. An early spray is most effective. The choice of fungicide can depend on the nature of local strains of P. infestans. Metalaxyl is a fungicide that was marketed for use against P. infestans, but suffered serious resistance issues when used on its own. In some regions of the world during the 1980s and 1990s, most strains of P. infestans became resistant to metalaxyl, but in subsequent years many populations shifted back to sensitivity. To reduce the occurrence of resistance, it is strongly advised to use single-target fungicides such as metalaxyl along with carbamate compounds. A combination of other compounds are recommended for managing metalaxyl-resistant strains. These include mandipropamid, chlorothalonil, fluazinam, triphenyltin, mancozeb, and others. In the United States, the Environmental Protection Agency has approved oxathiapiprolin for use against late blight. In African smallholder production fungicide application can be necessary up to once every three days.

==== In organic production ====
In the past, copper(II) sulfate solution (called 'bluestone') was used to combat potato blight. Copper pesticides remain in use on organic crops, both in the form of copper hydroxide and copper sulfate. Given the dangers of copper toxicity, other organic control options that have been shown to be effective include horticultural oils, phosphorous acids, and rhamnolipid biosurfactants, while sprays containing "beneficial" microbes such as Bacillus subtilis or compounds that encourage the plant to produce defensive chemicals (such as knotweed extract) have not performed as well. During the crop year 2008, many of the certified organic potatoes produced in the United Kingdom and certified by the Soil Association as organic were sprayed with a copper pesticide to control potato blight. According to the Soil Association, the total copper that can be applied to organic land is 6 kilograms per hectare (5.4 lb/acre)/year.

=== Control of tuber blight ===
Ridging is often used to reduce tuber contamination by blight. This normally involves piling soil or mulch around the stems of the potato blight, meaning the pathogen has farther to travel to get to the tuber. Another approach is to destroy the canopy around five weeks before harvest, using a contact herbicide or sulfuric acid to burn off the foliage. Eliminating infected foliage reduces the likelihood of tuber infection.

== Historical impact ==
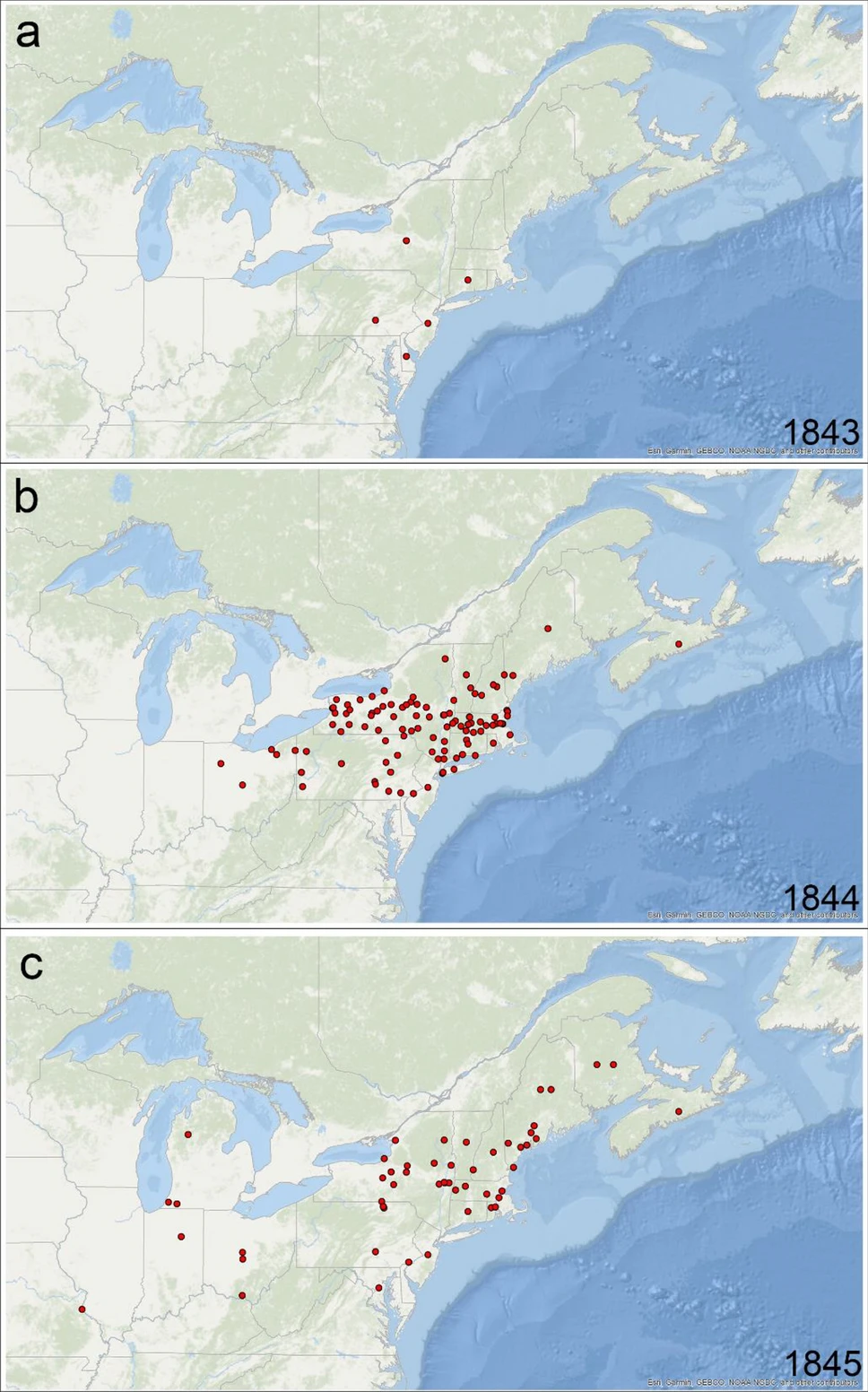
Maps of the geographic locations (occurrences) of the potato disease in the northeastern US and southeastern Canada from (a) 1843, (b) 1844 and (c) 1845 drawn from text analytics of US Commissioner of Patent Reports, 1843–1845. Image from Saeffer et al., 2024.

The first recorded instances of the disease were in the United States, in Philadelphia and New York City in early 1843. Winds then spread the spores, and in 1845 it was found from Illinois to Nova Scotia, and from Virginia to Ontario. It crossed the Atlantic Ocean with a shipment of seed potatoes for Belgian farmers in 1845. The disease being first identified in Europe around Kortrijk, Belgium, in June 1845, and resulted in the Flemish potato harvest failing that summer, yields declining 75–80%, leading to an estimated forty thousand deaths in the locale. All of the potato-growing countries in Europe were affected within a year.

The effect of Phytophthora infestans in Ireland in 1845–52 was one of the factors which caused more than one million to starve to death and forced another two million to emigrate. Most commonly referenced is the Great Irish Famine, during the late 1840s. Implicated in Ireland's fate was the island's disproportionate dependency on a single variety of potato, the Irish Lumper. The lack of genetic variability created a susceptible host population for the organism after the blight strains originating in Chiloé Archipelago replaced earlier potatoes of Peruvian origin in Europe.

During the First World War, all of the copper in Germany was used for shell casings and electric wire and therefore none was available for manufacturing copper(II) sulfate, a fungicide effective to the potato blight. A major late blight outbreak on potato in Germany therefore went untreated, and the resulting scarcity of potatoes contributed to the deaths from the blockade.

Since 1941, Eastern Africa has been suffering potato production losses because of strains of P. infestans from Europe.

France, Canada, the United States, and the Soviet Union researched P. infestans as a biological weapon in the 1940s and 1950s. Potato blight was one of more than 17 agents that the United States researched as potential biological weapons before the nation suspended its biological weapons program. Dr. Mannon Gallegley, a faculty member at WVA, worked in the late blight bioweapons program in the 1940s. It is unclear whether the pathogen was ever deployed. Whether a weapon based on the pathogen would be effective is questionable, due to the difficulties in delivering viable pathogen to an enemy's fields, and the role of uncontrollable environmental factors in spreading the disease.

Late blight (A2 type) has not yet been detected in Australia and strict biosecurity measures are in place. The disease has been seen in China, India and south-east Asian countries.

A large outbreak of P. infestans occurred on tomato plants in the Northeast United States in 2009.

In light of the periodic epidemics of P. infestans ever since its first emergence, it may be regarded as a periodically emerging pathogen – or a periodically "re-emerging pathogen".
