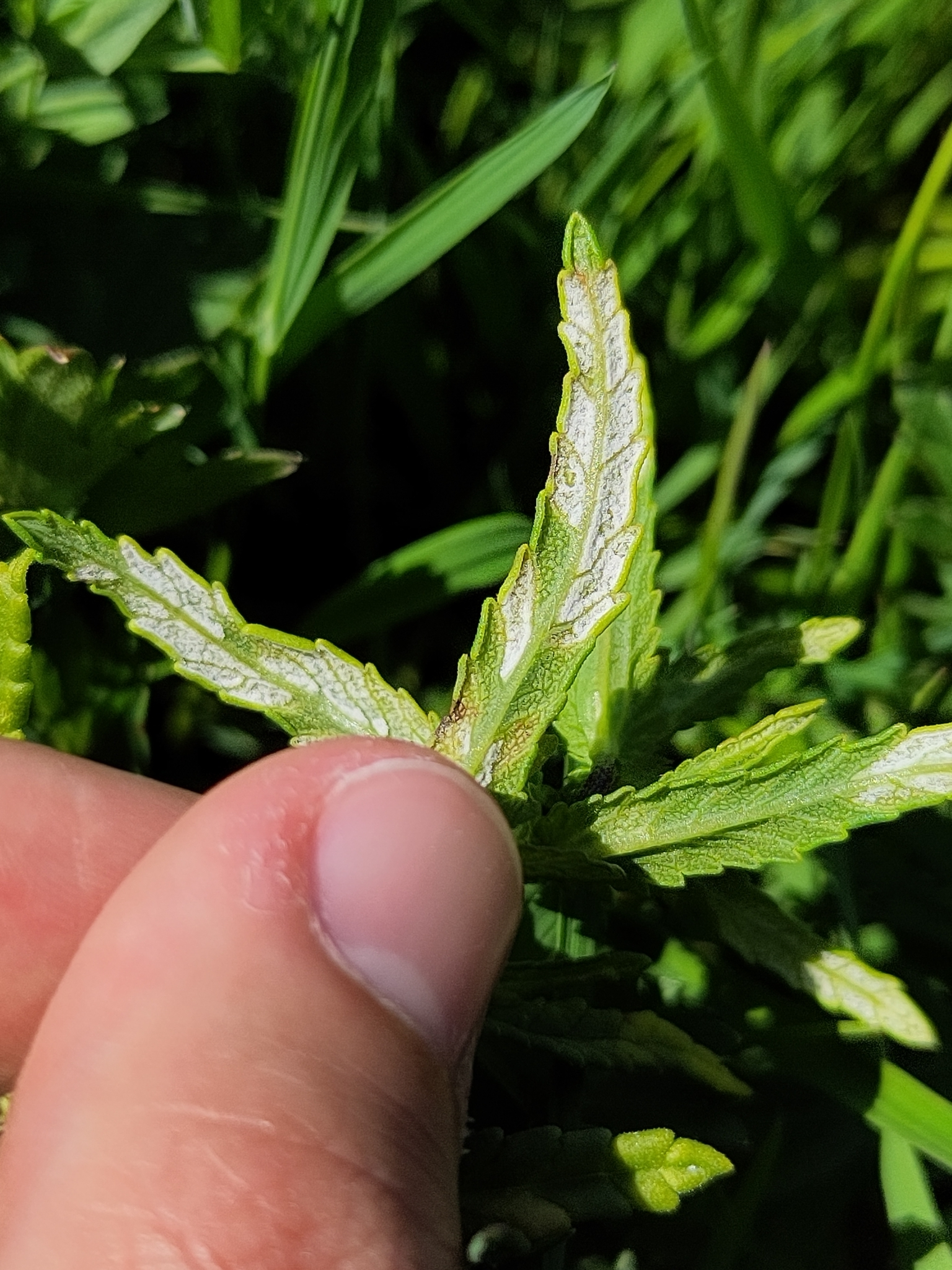
- Conidiophores of Plasmopara densa on the underside of leaves of Rhinanthus minor.

Scientific classification
- Domain: Eukaryota
- Clade: Sar
- Clade: Stramenopiles
- Phylum: Oomycota
- Class: Peronosporomycetes
- Order: Peronosporales
- Family: Peronosporaceae
- Genus: Plasmopara
- Species: P. densa

Binomial name
- Plasmopara densa (Rabenhorst) Schröter, 1886

= Plasmopara densa =

Downy mildew

Plasmopara densa is a downy mildew which infects plants in the Orobanchaceae. It has been reported from hosts in the genera Bartsia, Bellardia, Melampyrum, Odontites, Pedicularis, and Rhinanthus.

It causes yellowing of the leaves, with white conidiophores formed on the underside.

== Gallery ==
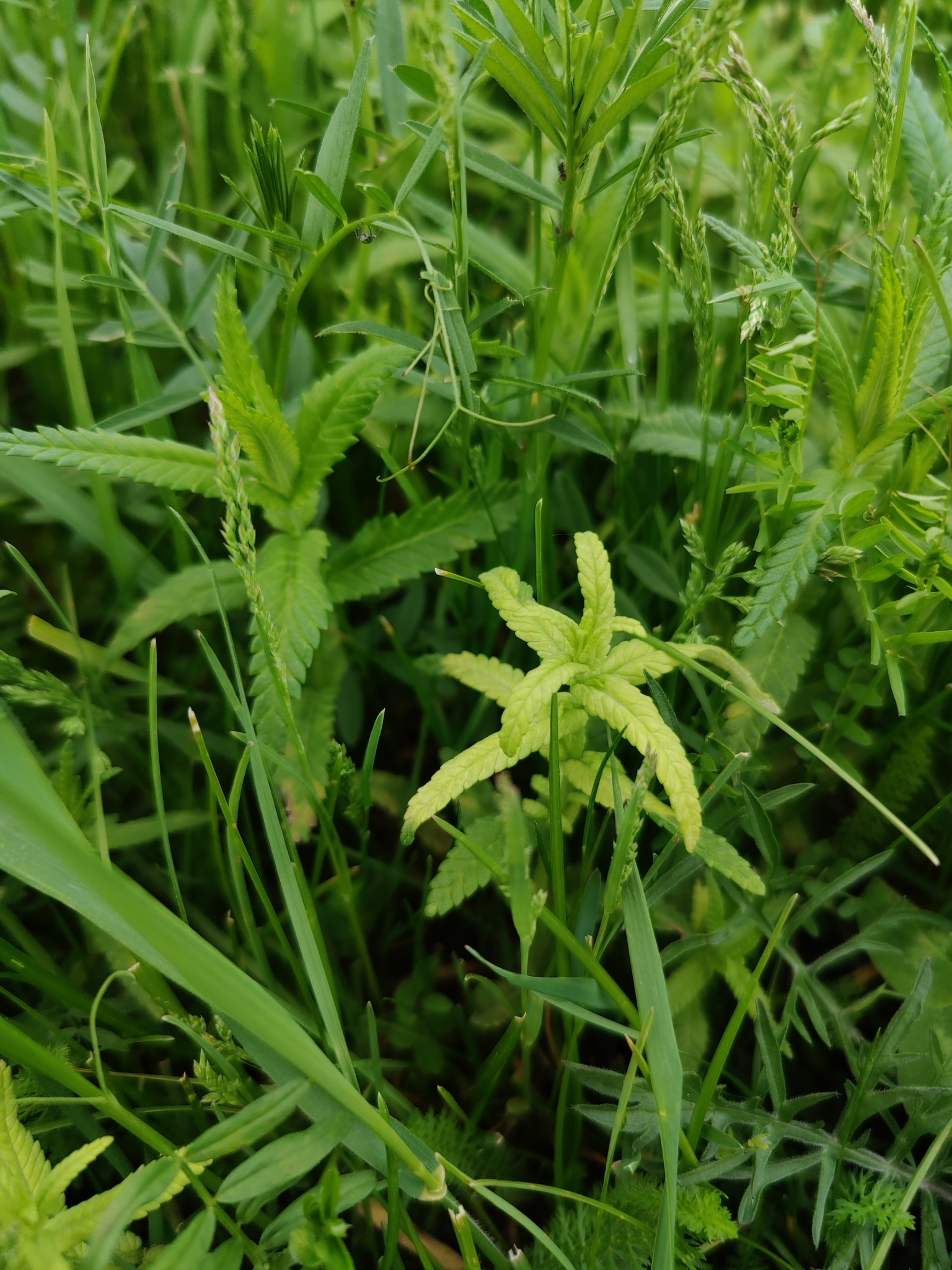
Symptoms of Plasmopara densa on Rhinanthus. Note the yellowed leaves.

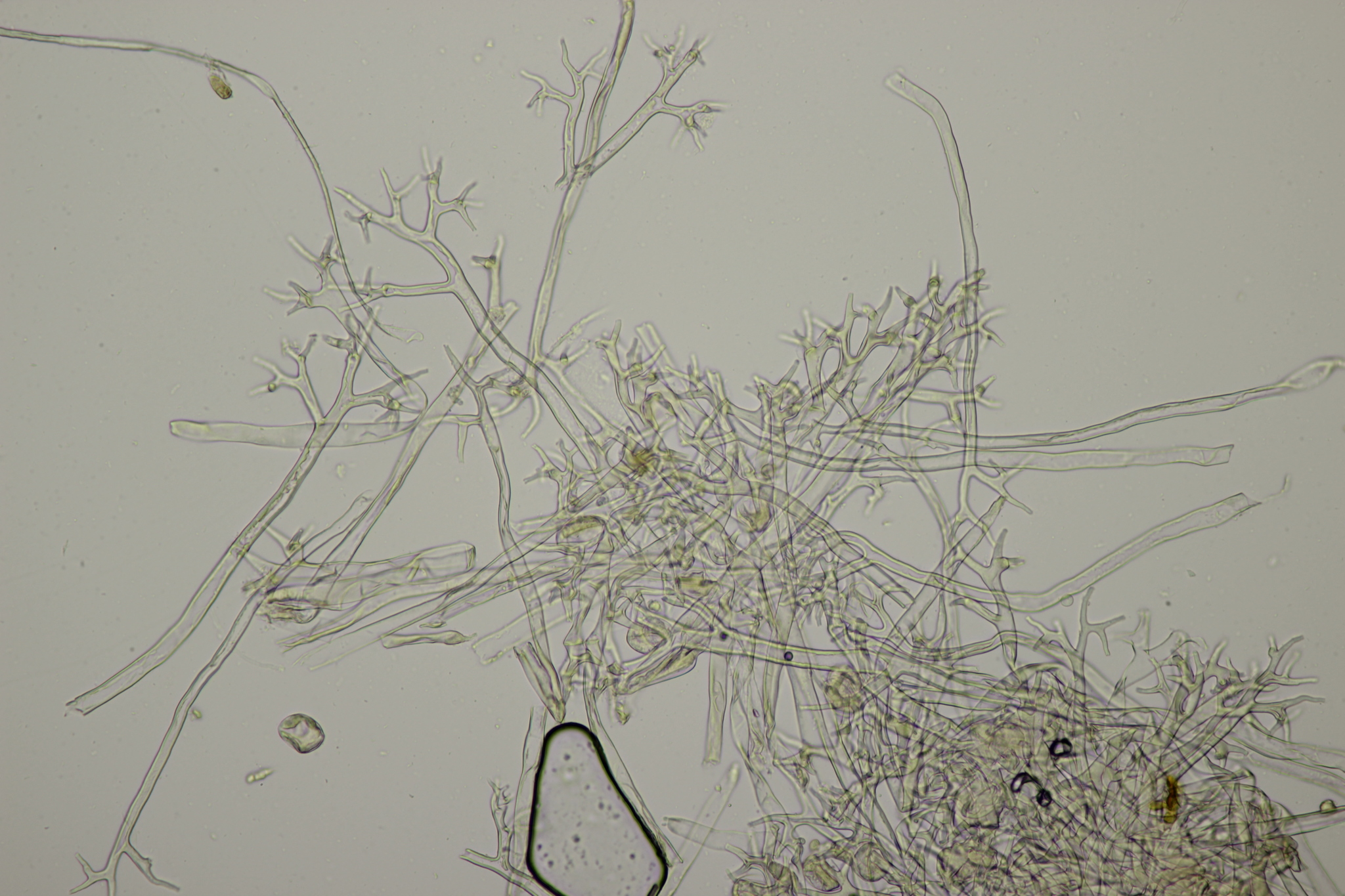
Conidiophores of Plasmopara densa from a leaf of Rhinanthus under the microscope.
