= Plasmopara obducens =

Scientific classification
- Domain: Eukaryota
- Clade: Sar
- Clade: Stramenopiles
- Phylum: Oomycota
- Class: Peronosporomycetes
- Order: Peronosporales
- Family: Peronosporaceae
- Genus: Plasmopara
- Species: P. obducens

Binomial name
- Plasmopara obducens (J. Schröt.) J. Schröt., (1886)

Synonyms
- Peronospora obducens J. Schröt., (1877); Rhysotheca obducens (J. Schröt.) G.W. Wilson, (1907); Peronospora impatientis Ellis & Everh., (1892); Plasmopara impatientis (Ellis & Everh.) Berl., (1898)

Species of single-celled organism

Plasmopara obducens is a species of oomycete that causes Impatiens downy mildew. It was first described on Impatiens noli-tangere in Germany in 1877. Plasmopara obducens is known from native species of Impatiens since the 1800s, but outbreaks on cultivated varieties of Impatiens walleriana started in 2003 in the United Kingdom and in 2004 in the United States. The outbreak spread worldwide by 2016.

== Morphology ==
Sporangiophores are an average of 373 (260-484) micrometers with the first branch appearing at 197 (120-271) micrometers. Sporangia are 16 (13-18) micrometers by 13 (11-16) micrometers. Resting spores are globose with a diameter of 28 micrometers

== Disease symptoms ==
Initially, leaves are stippled or yellowed. Infected leaves curl downward. A white down is often present on the underside of the leaves; buds and stems may also develop a down. Eventually, the leaves fall off the plant leaving just stems. In about a week, the plants are dead.

== Taxonomy ==
J. Schröter originally placed the species in the genus Peronospora but later moved it to the genus Plasmopara. Some authors believe the outbreaks on I. walleriana and I. balsamina are not caused by P. obducens but two new species P. destructor and P. velutina.
