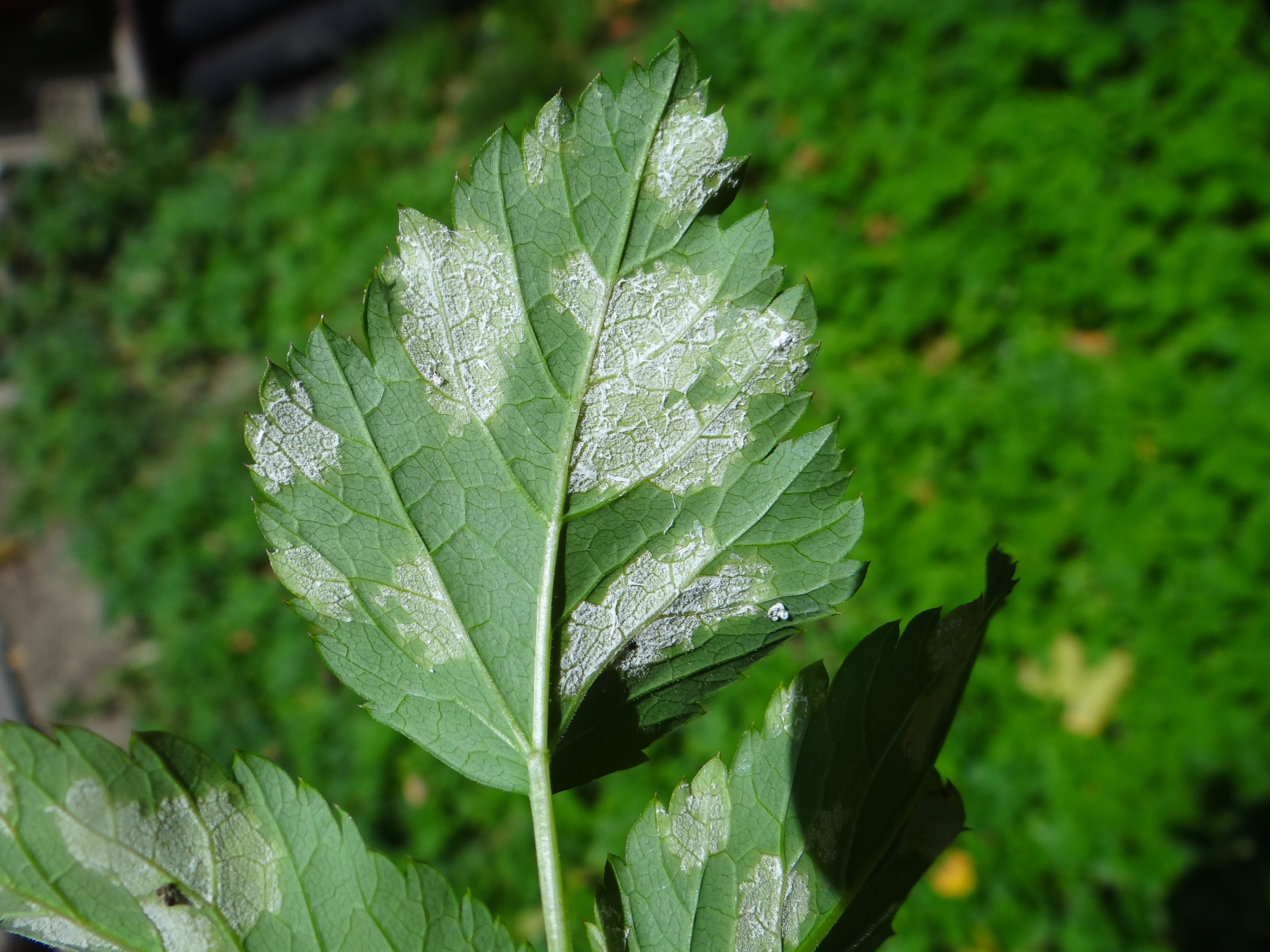
- Conidiophores of Plasmopara nivea on the underside of a leaf of Aegopodium podagraria

Scientific classification
- Domain: Eukaryota
- Clade: Sar
- Clade: Stramenopiles
- Phylum: Oomycota
- Class: Peronosporomycetes
- Order: Peronosporales
- Family: Peronosporaceae
- Genus: Plasmopara
- Species: P. nivea

Binomial name
- Plasmopara nivea (Unger) Schröter, 1889

= Plasmopara nivea =

Species of fungus

Plasmopara nivea is a downy mildew which infects plants in the Apiaceae. It has been reported from hosts in the genera Aegopodium, Carum, Conopodium, Crithmum, Heracleum, Levisticum, Oenanthe, Palimbia, Pleurospermum, Sanicula epipactis, Seseli, and Smyrnium. In the strictest sense the name Plasmopara nivea refers to Plasmopara infecting Aegopodium, and the wider group requires taxonomic revision. It causes yellowing of the leaves, with white conidiophores formed on the underside.
