= H. brassicae =

H. brassicae may refer to:

- Helminthosporium brassicae, a plant pathogen
- Hyaloperonospora brassicae, a plant pathogen
