= Plasmopara lactucae-radicis =

Scientific classification
- Domain: Eukaryota
- Clade: Sar
- Clade: Stramenopiles
- Division: Oomycota
- Class: Peronosporomycetes
- Order: Peronosporales
- Family: Peronosporaceae
- Genus: Plasmopara
- Species: P. lactucae-radicis

Binomial name
- Plasmopara lactucae-radicis Stangh. & Gilb., (1988)

Species of lettuce pathogen

Plasmopara lactucae-radicis is an obligate oomycete pathogen that causes root downy mildew of cultivated lettuce. It infects roots directly via zoospores, colonizes root tissues systemically, and sporulates on infected roots. Unlike most downy mildews, it is confined to the root system and can cause substantial reductions in lettuce growth and yield under favorable temperatures.
