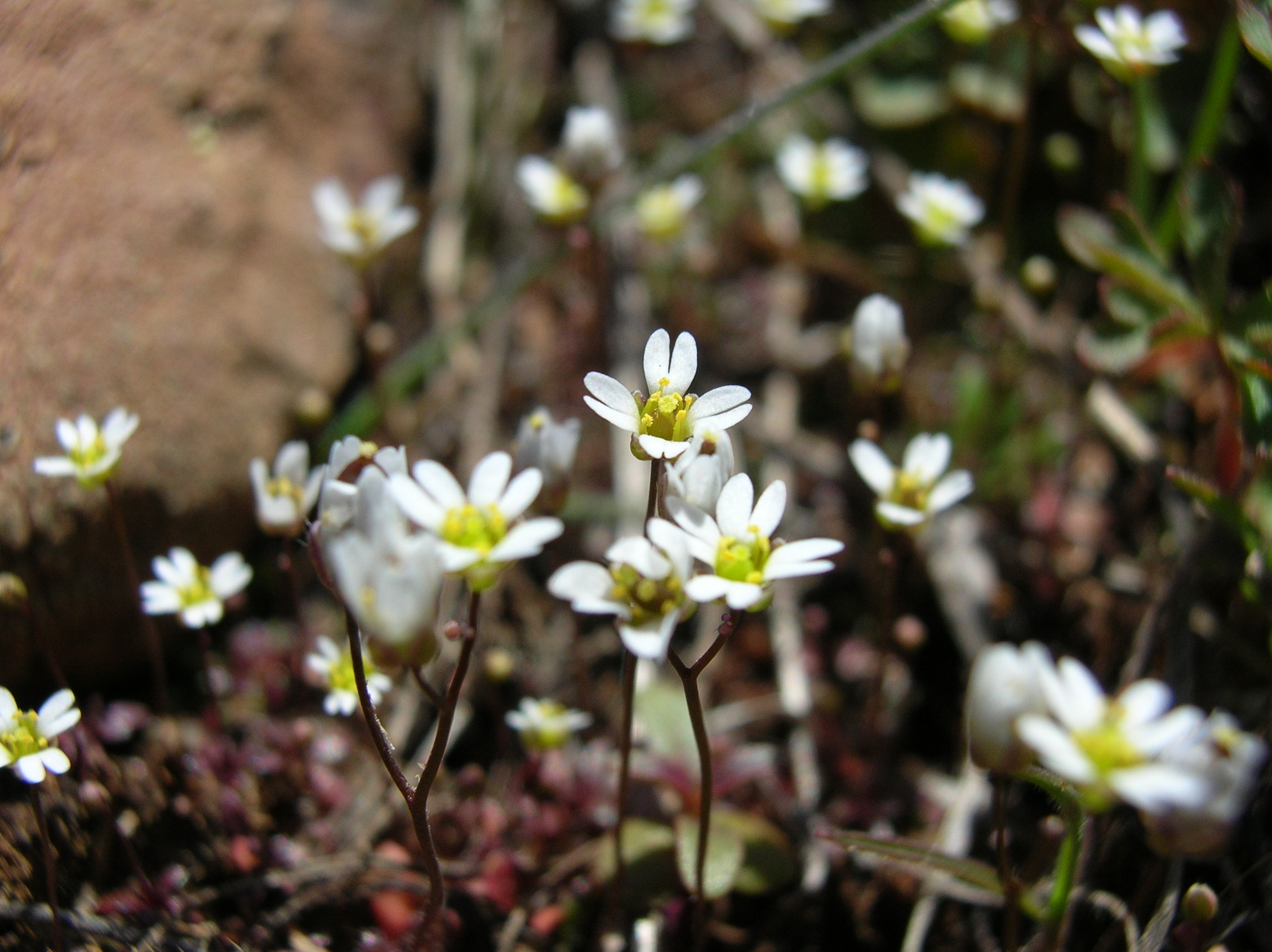

Scientific classification
- Kingdom: Plantae
- Clade: Tracheophytes
- Clade: Angiosperms
- Clade: Eudicots
- Clade: Rosids
- Order: Brassicales
- Family: Brassicaceae
- Genus: Draba
- Species: D. verna

Binomial name
- Draba verna L.

= Draba verna =

Species of flowering plant

Draba verna (syn. Erophila verna), common whitlowgrass, is a species of plant in the cabbage family. It is a small spring-flowering annual which is widely dispersed around the world, and which is found on walls, pavements and patches of bare ground. It has a complex taxonomy which is not yet fully elucidated.

== Description ==
Common whitlowgrass is a spring-flowering annual, typically up to 10 cm (4 in) tall (sometimes as much as 25 cm (10 in)) with a basal rosette and one or more leafless flowering stems. It is variably hairy, sometimes almost completely glabrous (hairless), especially on the stems. The elliptical leaves are up to 20 mm (1 in) long (exceptionally up to 35 mm (1.4 in)) and 8 mm (0.3 in) wide and are often entire, but sometimes with a single tooth on one or both sides, and they taper gradually into a more-or-less distinct petiole. The surfaces and margins usually have a scattering of hairs that are forked, or Y-shaped, at the tips. The central vein is faintly visible on the top side of the leaf but easily distinguishable on the underside. Mature leaves can turn a reddish colour.

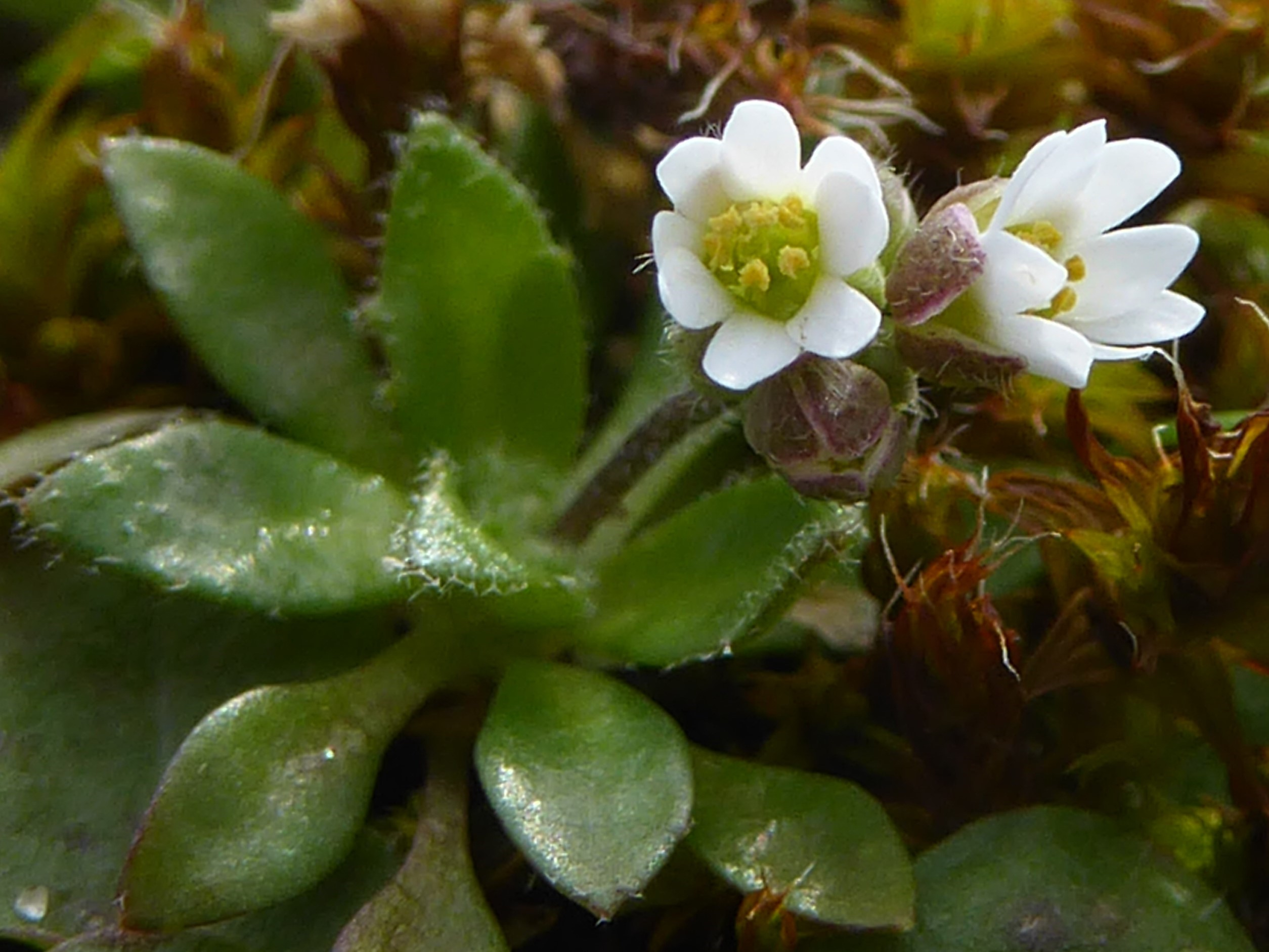
Flowers of common whitlowgrass

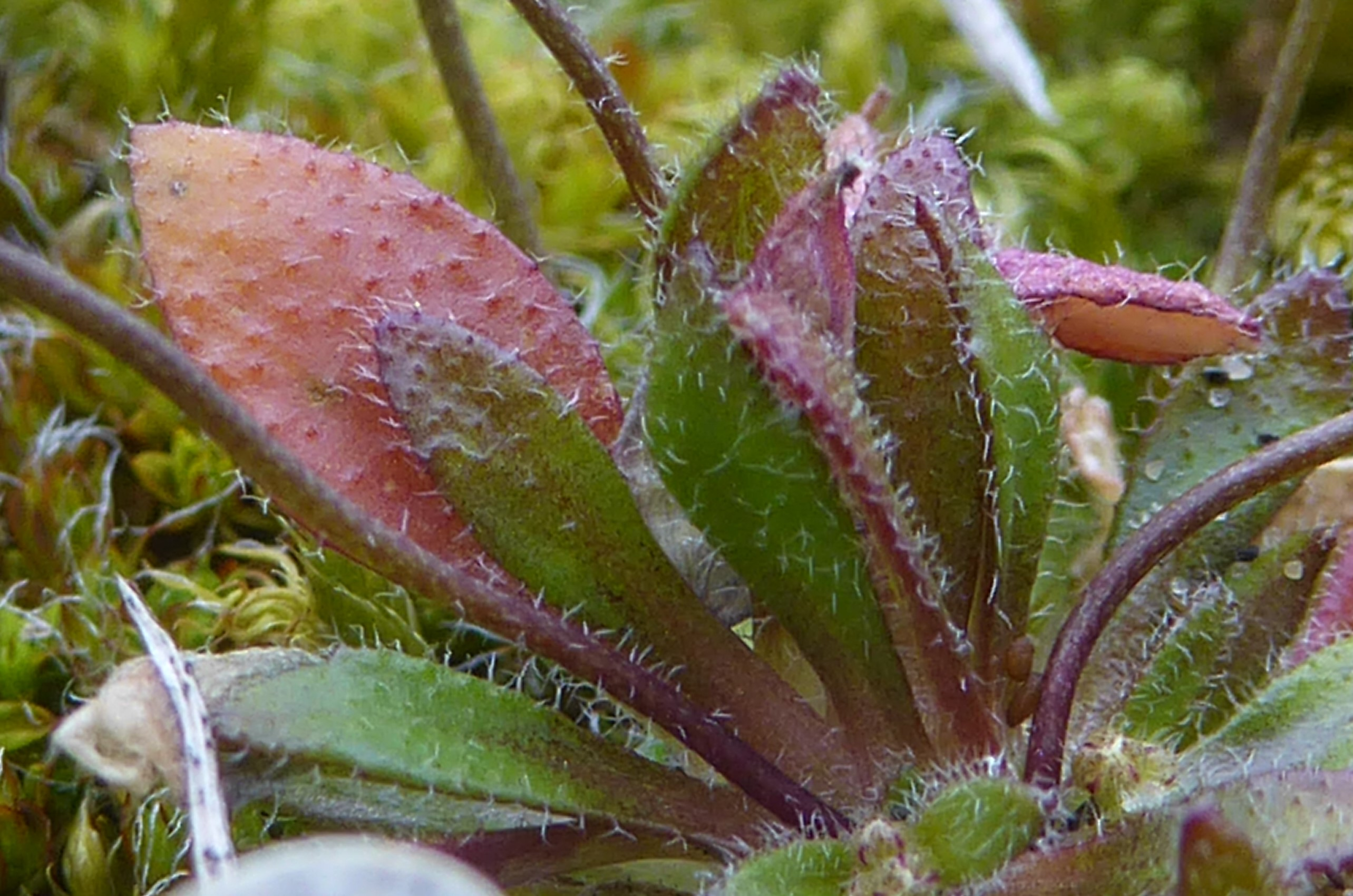
The leaves are often covered with forked hairs

Flowering occurs in early spring, March–May in northern latitudes. Each stem (of which there can be several) bears a lax raceme of about 10 long-stalked flowers with 4 white petals, about 3 mm (0.1 in) long, which are so deeply divided (bifid) that it can appear that there are 8 petals. The flowers have 6 stamens with yellow anthers, and one style. The sepals are about 2 mm (0.1 in) long, green, hairy and often have a purplish margin. The fruit (called a silique), forms immediately after flowering while the petals are still present, due to self-pollination. It is oval to elliptical, flattened and up to 9 mm (0.4 in) long by 3 mm (0.1 in) wide with a persistent style at the tip Each silique contains a dozen or so round seeds in two "valves", which split open to leave just the transparent membrane between them, which looks like a tiny version of an honesty seedpod.

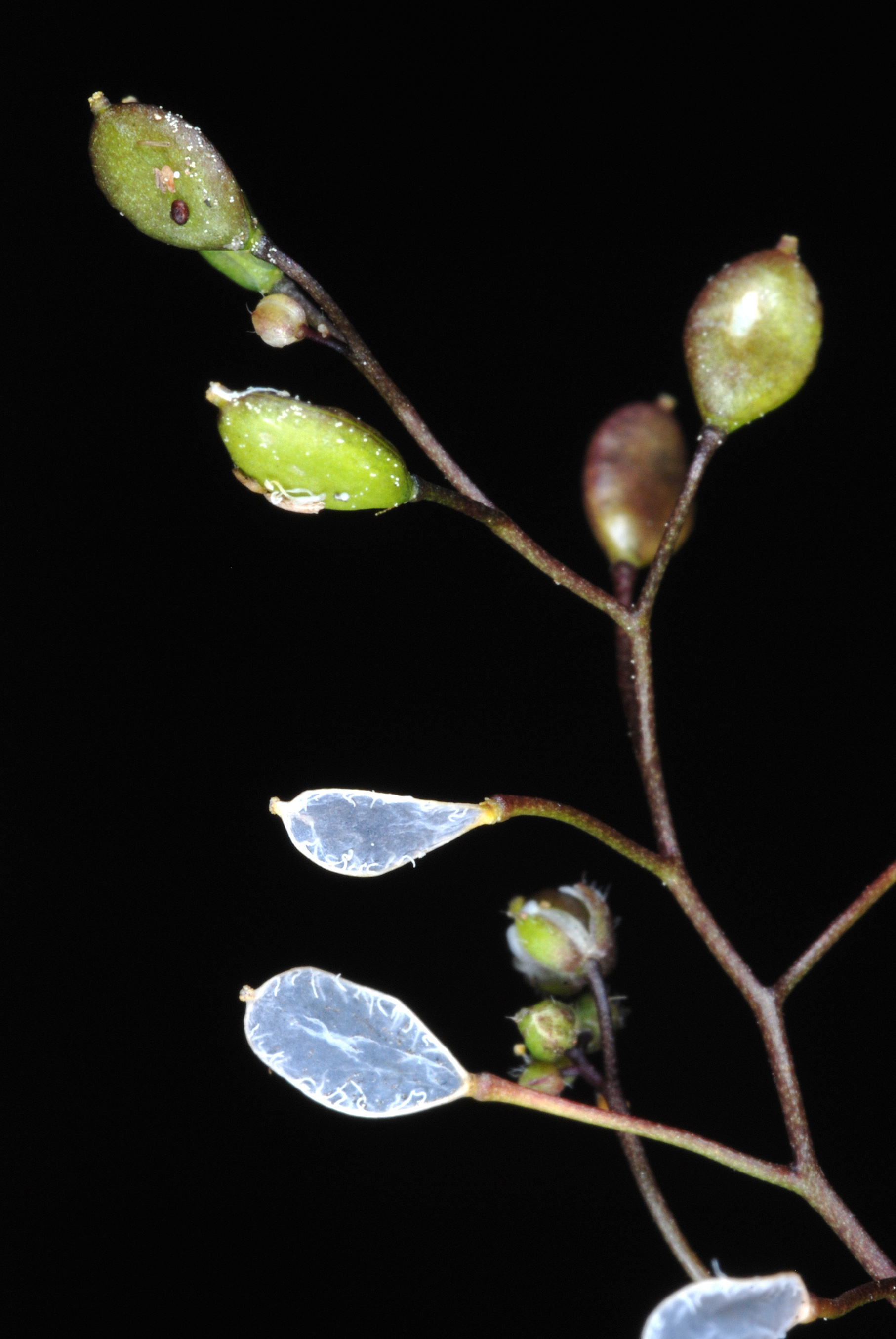
The seedpods split open to leave just the translucent membrane that separates the valves.

In the summer months the seeds remain dormant, and they need about 3 months to after-ripen before they can germinate successfully, during which time they need 5–7 weeks of sunlight or they will not germinate well in the autumn. In experiments, they were found to germinate most successfully at 50% to 60% relative humidity.

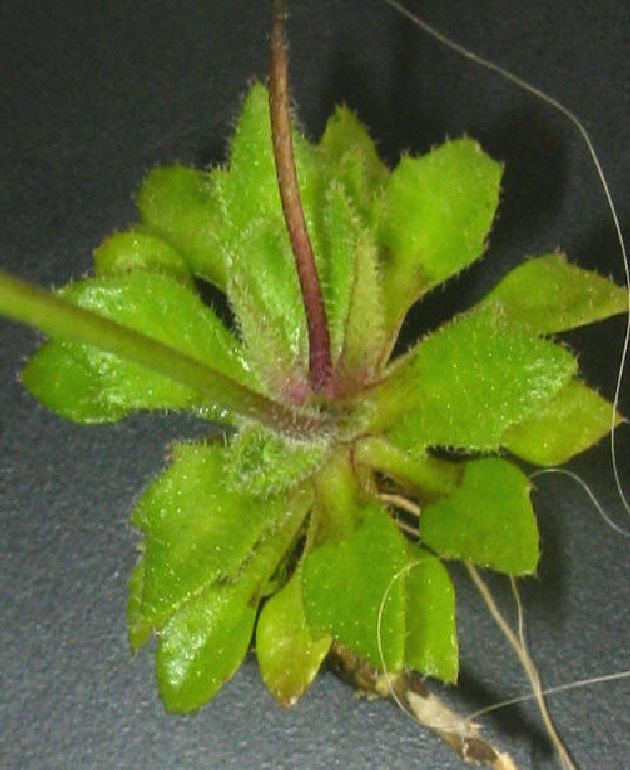
Some leaves have a single tooth on one side of the leaf blade, resembling a whitlow.

== Taxonomy ==
The taxonomy of the genus Draba is extraordinarily complex, particularly for Draba verna, which is sometimes treated as a whole genus (Erophila DC.) in its own right, with a number of different species and varieties listed under various treatments. The reason for this is that D. verna reproduces almost entirely by inbreeding (the flowers pollinating themselves immediately on opening), so a large number of genetically similar lines can be recognised. These lines can even have different chromosome numbers (or ploidy levels), making them less compatible with other plants even when cross-pollination does occur. A full list of synonyms, subspecies and varieties is given in the Brassicaceae Species Checklist. The account here is for Draba verna L. in its original, aggregate, sense, although D. praecox and D. majuscula can be viewed as separate species.

The chromosome number of Draba verna (as the segregate Erophila verna (L.) DC.) is 2n = 30-46. If it is treated as the aggregate, then D. majuscula has 2n = 14, and D. praecox has 2n = 48-56.

The common name "whitlowgrass" refers to an old meaning of the word, which Aulus Cornelius Celsus described as "a small piece of flesh [which] sometimes grows out from the nail, causing great pain; the Greeks call it pterygium." The leaves of whitlowgrass sometimes have a single forward-pointing tooth on one side, thus resembling this condition. The "grass" part of the name simply means "plant" and does not imply that it is in the botanical grasses family. Other common names for it include "spring draba", "shadflower", "nailwort", "vernal whitlow grass" and "early whitlow grass".

== Identification ==
The combination of bifid petals (sometimes giving the impression of having flowers with 8 petals) and leafless stems makes this species very easy to identify. Separating it from the critical segregates D. majuscula and D. praecox, if you choose to accept them, is much more difficult. The depth of division of the petals, the hairiness of the leaves and stems, and the length of the petiole are all useful field characters.

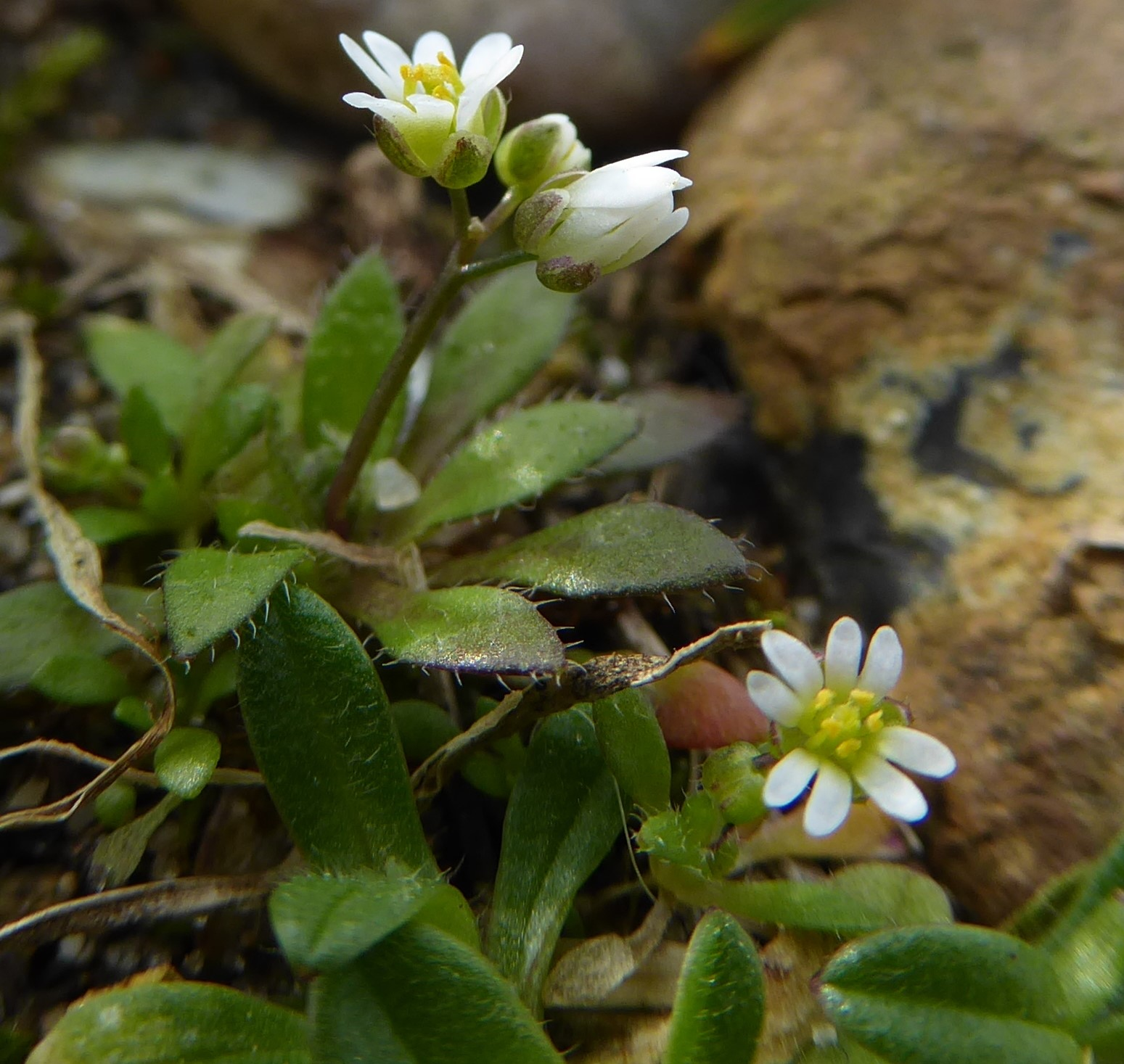
Whitlowgrasses can look as if they have 8 petals

== Distribution and status ==
Common whitlowgrass is native to Europe, western Asia and parts of North Africa southwards to Ethiopia. It is also widely established in the temperate regions of the Americas, Australia, New Zealand and Japan. It has been postulated that it was brought to North America when the European colonizers came to the New World.

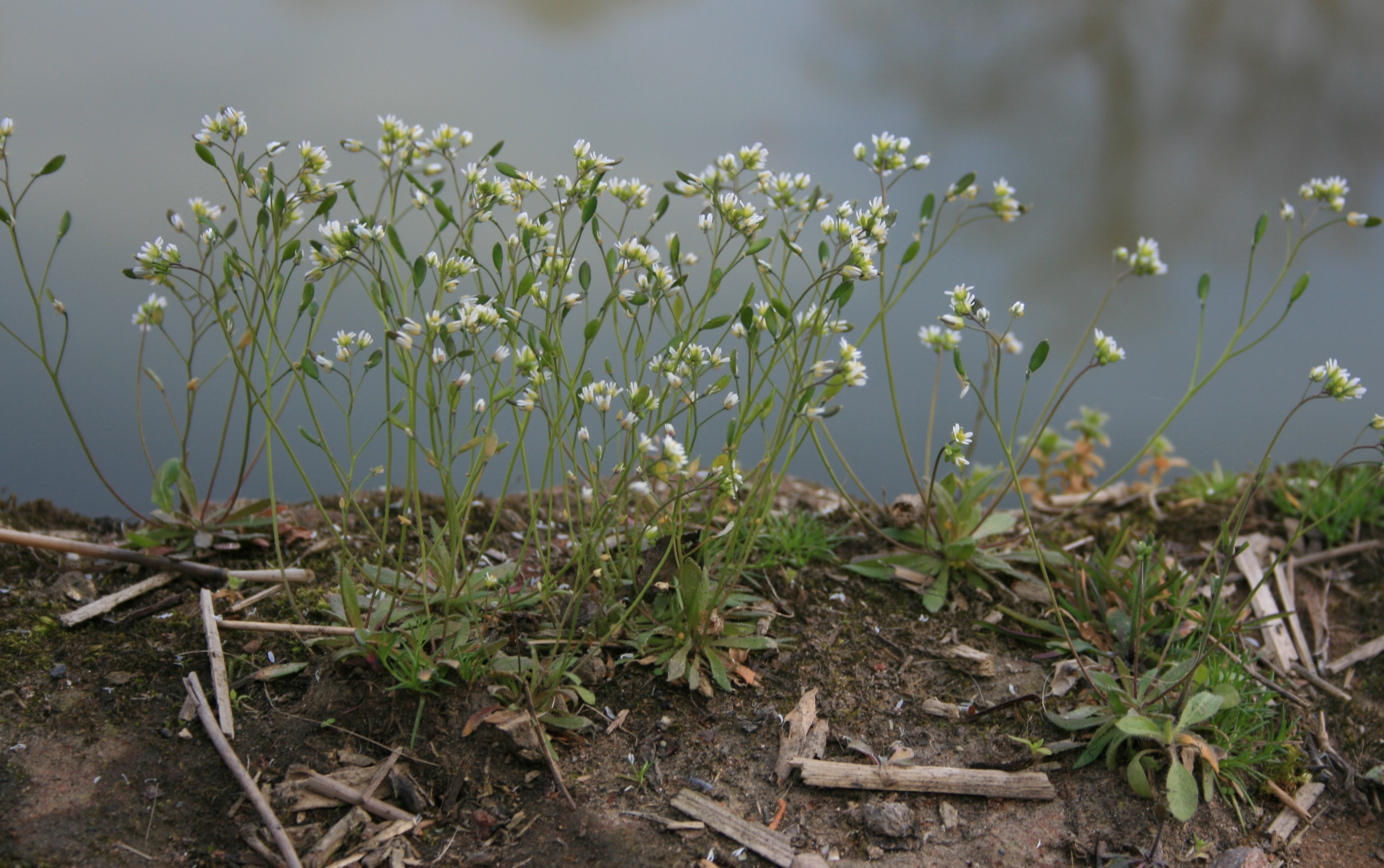
Whitlowgrass grows on bare soils, with the minimum of competition

It is sometimes listed as an invasive species in places where it is introduced, such as the United States, but there is no suggestion that it causes any harm. Its global status has not been assessed, but in countries where it is native it is generally listed as "Least Concern."

== Habitat and ecology ==
Typical places for common whitlowgrass to grow include almost any place where there is bare soil, including limestone pavements, sand dunes, field margins, urban pavements and quarry waste.

Its Ellenberg values in Britain are L = 3, F = 3, R = 6, N = 3, and S = 0, which shows that it favours relatively dry, neutral soils and low levels of fertility.

The UK's database of Insects and their Food Plants lists just 4 species that feed on common whitlowgrass. Three of these are weevils: the cabbage leaf weevil, Ceutorhynchus contractus, the cabbage stem weevil, C. quadridens, and C. hirtulus. The other is a butterfly, the orange tip, which is a common species whose larvae feed on the flowers of plants in the cabbage family.

Two species of downy mildew infect common whitlowgrass, particularly when it is suffering from water stress: Hyaloperonospora erophilae coats the leaves and turns them chlorotic, whereas H. praecox has more localised and less obvious symptoms. They can be identified by the differences in their haustoria.

== Uses ==
There appear to be no recorded uses for whitlowgrass. In the 1600s Culpeper described it as "exceedingly good for those imposthumes in the joints, and under the nails, which they call Whitlows, Felons, Andicorns and Nail-wheals", but Vickery explains that it was never really used in folk medicine either in Britain or Ireland. Neither is it mentioned in American herbals. Presumably Culpeper ascribed to it this property according to the doctrine of signatures, owing to the unusual shape of the leaves.
