= Bremia krungthepmahanakhonamonrattanakosinmahintharayuthayamahadilokphopnoppharatratchathaniburiromudomratchaniwetmahasathanamonpimanawatansathitsakkathattiyawitsanukamprasitnonopsis =

Bremia krung...

Scientific classification
- Domain: Eukaryota
- Supergroup: Stramenopiles
- Division: Oomycota
- Class: Peronosporomycetes
- Order: Peronosporales
- Family: Peronosporaceae
- Genus: Bremia
- Species: B. krungthepmahanakhonamonrattanakosinmahintharayuthayamahadilokphopnoppharatratchathaniburiromudomratchaniwetmahasathanamonpimanawatansathitsakkathattiyawitsanukamprasitnonopsis

Binomial name
- Bremia krungthepmahanakhonamonrattanakosinmahintharayuthayamahadilokphopnoppharatratchathaniburiromudomratchaniwetmahasathanamonpimanawatansathitsakkathattiyawitsanukamprasitnonopsis Kontos & Thines in Kontos et al., 2025

Species of single-celled organism

Bremia krungthepmahanakhonamonrattanakosinmahintharayuthayamahadilokphopnoppharatratchathaniburiromudomratchaniwetmahasathanamonpimanawatansathitsakkathattiyawitsanukamprasitnonopsis is a species of oomycete. It is an obligate plant parasite on Crepis pyrenaica, a member of the hawksbeard plant genus Crepis. The species was found on a specimen of C. pyrenaica found in Germany. The species name, which comes from the full ceremonial name of the city of Bangkok in Thailand (with the end suffix -nonopsis meaning "not like", as the authors did not consider the organism to visually resemble the city), is the current longest species name, with 181 characters.

== See also ==
- Myxococcus llanfairpwllgwyngyllgogerychwyrndrobwllllantysiliogogogochensis – a gram-negative bacterium isolated in the Welsh town of Llanfairpwllgyngyll
