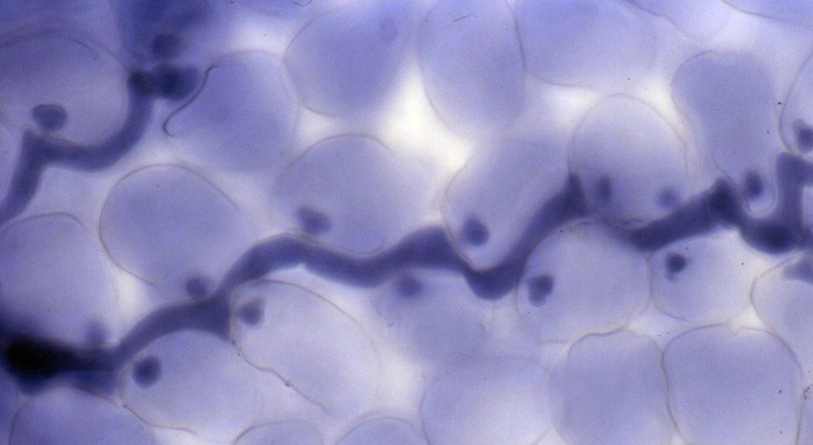
- Hyaloperonospora arabidopsidis on Arabidopsis thaliana

Scientific classification
- Domain: Eukaryota
- Clade: Sar
- Clade: Stramenopiles
- Phylum: Oomycota
- Class: Peronosporomycetes
- Order: Peronosporales
- Family: Peronosporaceae
- Genus: Hyaloperonospora
- Species: H. arabidopsidis

Binomial name
- Hyaloperonospora arabidopsidis (Gäum.) Göker, Riethm., Voglmayr, Weiß & Oberw., 2004

= Hyaloperonospora arabidopsidis =

Species of single-celled organism

Hyaloperonospora arabidopsidis is a species from the family Peronosporaceae. It is an obligate parasite and the causal agent of the downy mildew of the plant model organism Arabidopsis thaliana. While H. arabidopsidis has for a long time been subsumed under Peronospora parasitica (now Hyaloperonospora parasitica), recent studies have shown that H. parasitica is restricted to Capsella bursa-pastoris as a host plant. Like the other Hyaloperonospora species, H. arabidopsidis is highly specialized to Arabidopsis thaliana.
