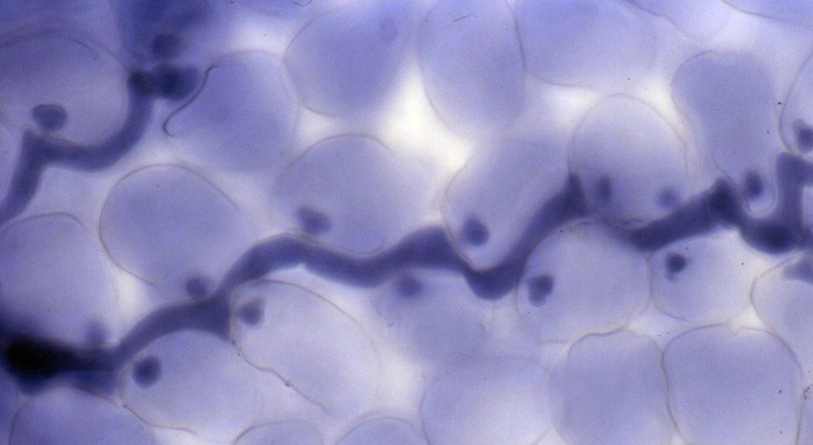
- Hyaloperonospora arabidopsidis on Arabidopsis thaliana

Scientific classification
- Domain: Eukaryota
- Clade: Sar
- Clade: Stramenopiles
- Division: Oomycota
- Class: Peronosporomycetes
- Order: Peronosporales
- Family: Peronosporaceae
- Genus: Hyaloperonospora
- Species: H. parasitica

Binomial name
- Hyaloperonospora parasitica (Pers.) Constant., 2002

= Hyaloperonospora parasitica =

Species of plant pathogen

Hyaloperonospora parasitica is an oomycete from the family Peronosporaceae. It has been considered for a long time to cause downy mildew of a variety of species within the Brassicaceae, on which the disease can cause economically important damage by killing seedlings or affecting the quality of produce intended for freezing. Hyaloperonospora parasitica causes downy mildew on a wide range of many different plants. It belongs to the Kingdom Chromista, the phylum Oomycota, and the family Peronosporaceae. The former name for H. parasitica was Peronospora parasitica until it was reclassified and put in the genus Hyaloperonospora. It is an especially vicious disease on crops of the family Brassicaceae. It is most famous for being a model pathogen of Arabidopsis thaliana which is a model organism used for experimental purposes. Accordingly, the former Hyaloperonospora parasitica has been split into a large number of species. For instance, the taxonomically correct name of the parasite of the well-known model organism Arabidopsis thaliana is Hyaloperonospora arabidopsidis, not H. parasitica, whereas the pathogen of Brassica has to be called Hyaloperonospora brassicae.

== Host range and symptoms ==
The infection first appears as conidiophores covering the upper and lower leaf surfaces. Other symptoms include lesions on spikelet, fungal growth on leaves, and necrosis on stems and leaves. Hyaloperonospora Parasitica has a very wide host range. It can infect garlic mustard, horseradish, cruciferous vegetables, Shepherd's purse, Cheiranthus spp., Cucurbits, purple vein rocket, treacle mustard, wallflower, spurges, candytuft, mustard plants, radish, and sweet alyssum. Although it is not significantly damaging on any one specific plant, the damage of H. parasitica can cause major economic losses if not managed properly. The recommendation for management is weekly fungicide application.

== Disease cycle ==
This is a polycyclic pathogen with a sexual and an asexual stage. It thrives in cool moist environments. Over winter in the soil, oospores survive and wait for spring. In warmer conditions when it gets to about 47–53 degrees F the oospores will germinate and produce an appressorium or form a short germ tube. The mycelium grows intracellularly and haustoria penetrate through the host cells when the temperature is around 60 degrees F. After about 1–2 weeks when the temperature is between 60 and 64 degrees F, conidiophores (the asexual stage) will form out of the plant stomata bearing conidia. Sporulation occurs at night. The conidia disseminate in high humidity mornings when it's about 50–60 degrees. Meanwhile, during the sexual stage, the antheridia (the male sex organ) fertilizes the oogonium (the female sex organ) with a fertilization tube and an oospore is developed.

== Pathogenesis ==
Hyaloperonospora parasitica is an obligate biotroph, meaning it lives off a host obtaining nutrients. The pathogen infects about six hours after landing on a plant surface. The spores produce an appressorium which in turn produces a penetration peg. This hypha grows from bottom of the appressorium and works its way through an intercellular junction of two epidermal cells. As the penetration peg grows between cells, haustoria grow into the cells to gain nutrients. The oomycete grows until it has penetrated through the entire leaf where conidiophores are then grown out of the stomata and disseminated by wind and rain.

Synonyms:

- Botrytis parasitica Pers., 1796
- ...

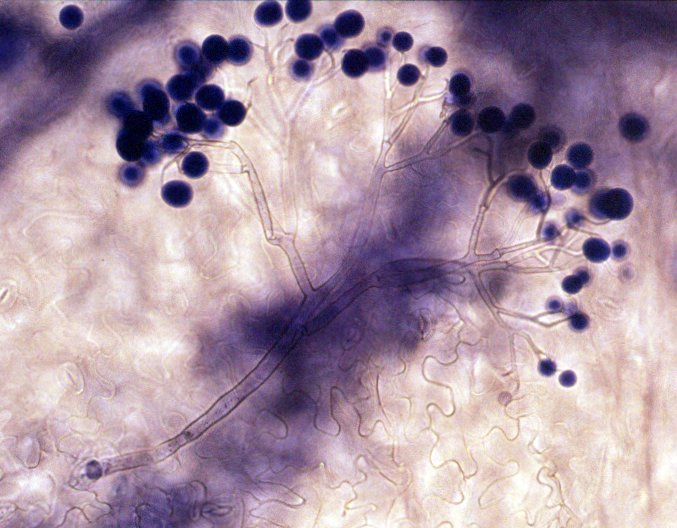
Conidiophores of Hyaloperonospora parasitica each harboring several conidia
