= Basidiophora =

Scientific classification
- Domain: Eukaryota
- Clade: Diaphoretickes
- Clade: SAR
- Clade: Stramenopiles
- Phylum: Oomycota
- Order: Peronosporales
- Family: Peronosporaceae
- Genus: Basidiophora; Roze & Cornu

Genus of fungi

Basidiophora is a genus of oomycetes belonging to the family Peronosporaceae. It is a water mold that causes downy mildew disease on plants such as the New England aster.

The species of this genus are found in Europe, Japan, Northern America and New Zealand.

Species:

- Basidiophora delawarensis E.C.Wallace, C.Salgado, N.F.Greg. & J.A.Crouch
- Basidiophora entospora Roze & Cornu
- Basidiophora montana R.W.Barreto
- Basidiophora simplex (Peck) Sökücü & Thines
