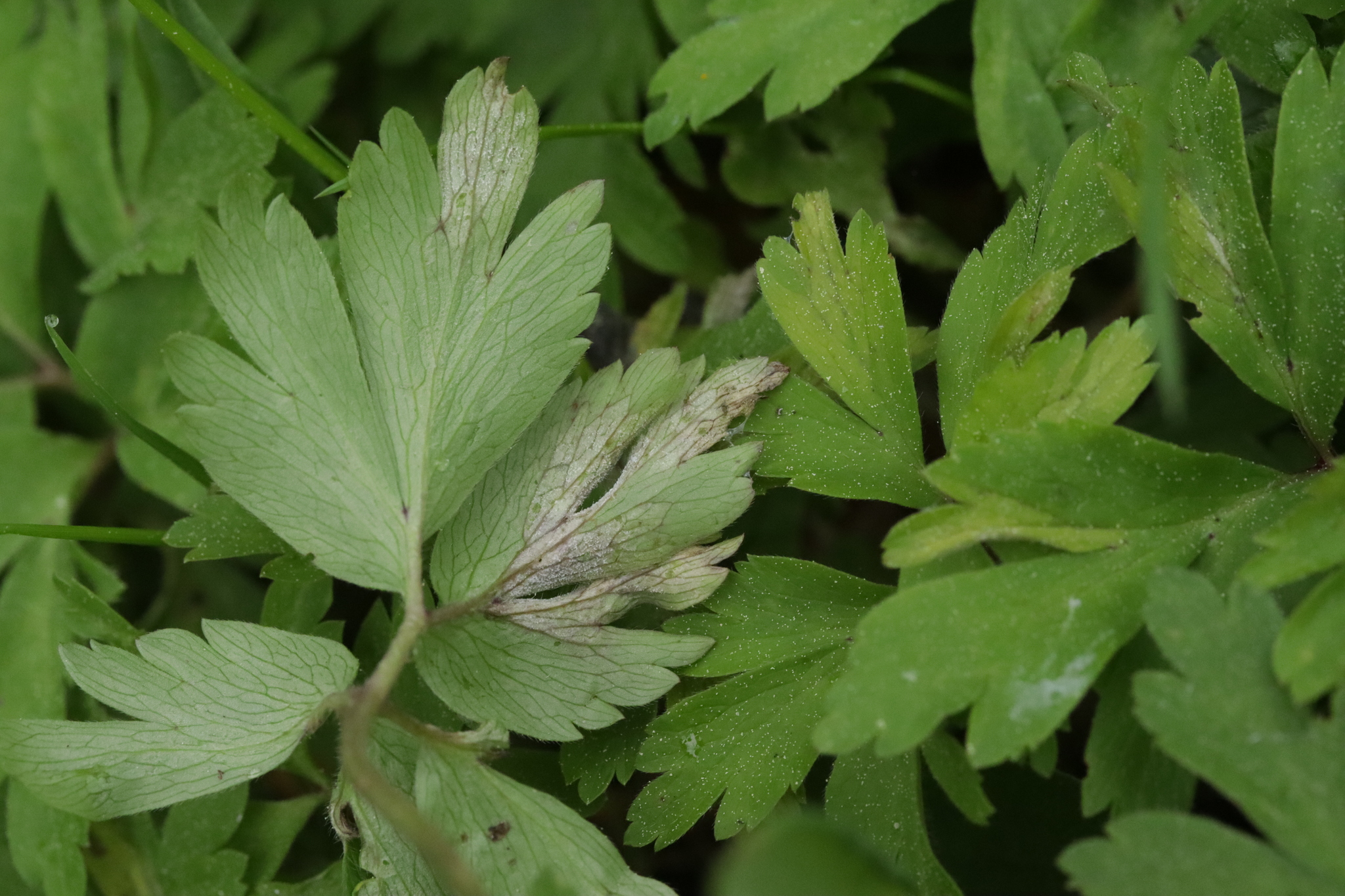
- Plasmoverna pygmaea on Anemone nemorosa.

Scientific classification
- Domain: Eukaryota
- Clade: Sar
- Clade: Stramenopiles
- Clade: Pseudofungi
- Phylum: Oomycota
- Class: Oomycetes
- Order: Peronosporales
- Family: Peronosporaceae
- Genus: Plasmoverna; Constant., Voglmayr, Fatehi & Thines

Species
- Plasmoverna pygmaea

= Plasmoverna =

Genus of oomycetes

Plasmoverna is a genus of oomycetes in the family Peronosporaceae. Species in the genus are downy mildews that infect plants in the family Ranunculaceae.
