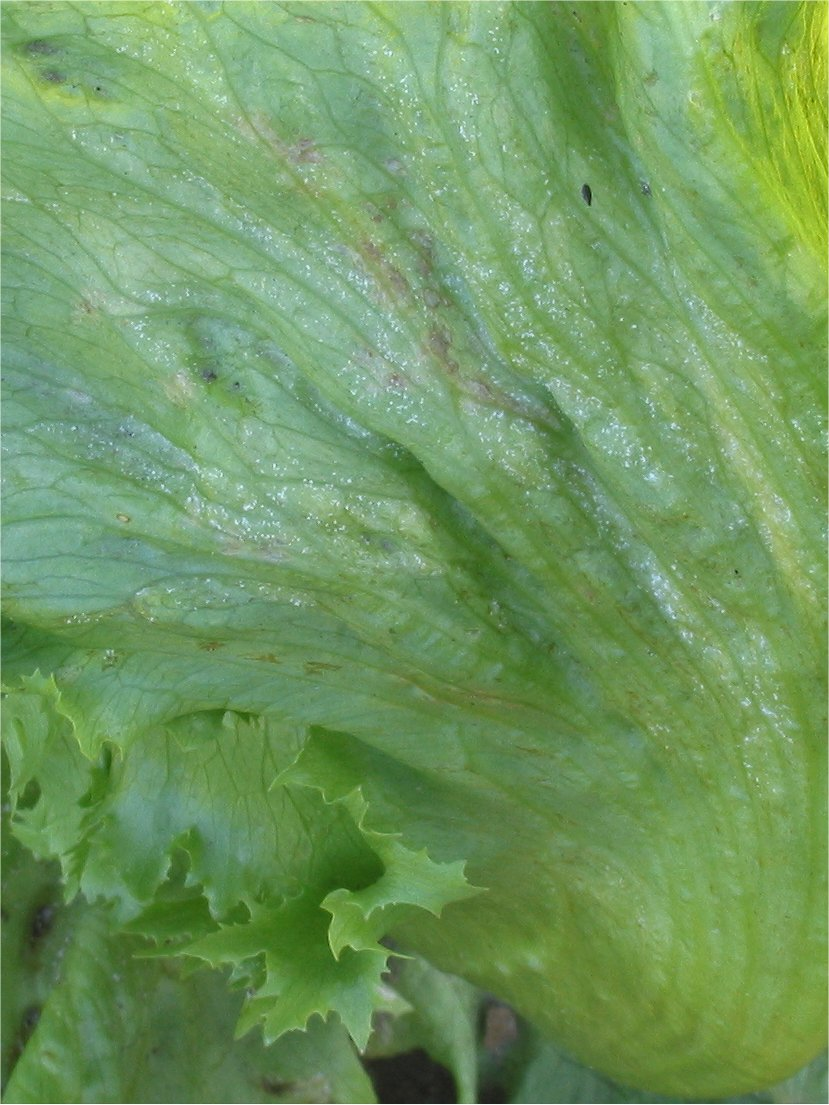
- Iceberg lettuce infected with Bremia lactucae

Scientific classification
- Domain: Eukaryota
- Clade: Sar
- Clade: Stramenopiles
- Division: Oomycota
- Class: Peronosporomycetes
- Order: Peronosporales
- Family: Peronosporaceae
- Genus: Bremia
- Species: B. lactucae

Binomial name
- Bremia lactucae Regel, Bot. Ztg.: 666 (1843)

Synonyms
- Botrytis gangliformis Berk. [as 'ganglioniformis'], (1846); Bremia centaureae Syd., (1923); Bremia gangliformis (Berk.) C.G. Shaw, (1949); Peronospora gangliformis Tul. [as 'ganglioniformis'], (1854); Peronospora gangliformis (Berk.) de Bary, (1863)

= Bremia lactucae =

Species of single-celled organism

Bremia lactucae is a plant pathogen. This microorganism causes a disease of lettuce (Lactuca sativa) denominated as downy mildew. Some other strains can be found on 36 genera of Asteraceae including Senecio and Sonchus. Experiments using sporangia from hosts do not infect lettuce and it is concluded that the fungus exists as a quantity of host-specific strains (formae speciales). Wild species, such as Lactuca serriola, or varieties of Lactuca can hold strains that infect lettuce, but these pathogens are not sufficiently common to seriously infect the plant.

The severity of damage caused by Bremia can vary depending on environmental conditions. High humidity and cool temperatures are optimal for infection and spread of the disease.

Lettuce that is infected with downy mildew causes the plant to become more susceptible for other pathogens. The infected leaf tissue can serve as an entry for secondary infection, particularly to pathogens that cause soft rots such as, Botrytis cinerea.

The plant can suffer systemic infections. Metalaxyl is effective against this microorganism.

The most effective management practice of downy mildew is to use resistant cultivars of Lettuce. Using an irrigation system that is in the ground as opposed to a sprinkler system reduces leaf wetness, which is favorable for infection. Other practices include removing infected plant debris from soil and application of fungicide.

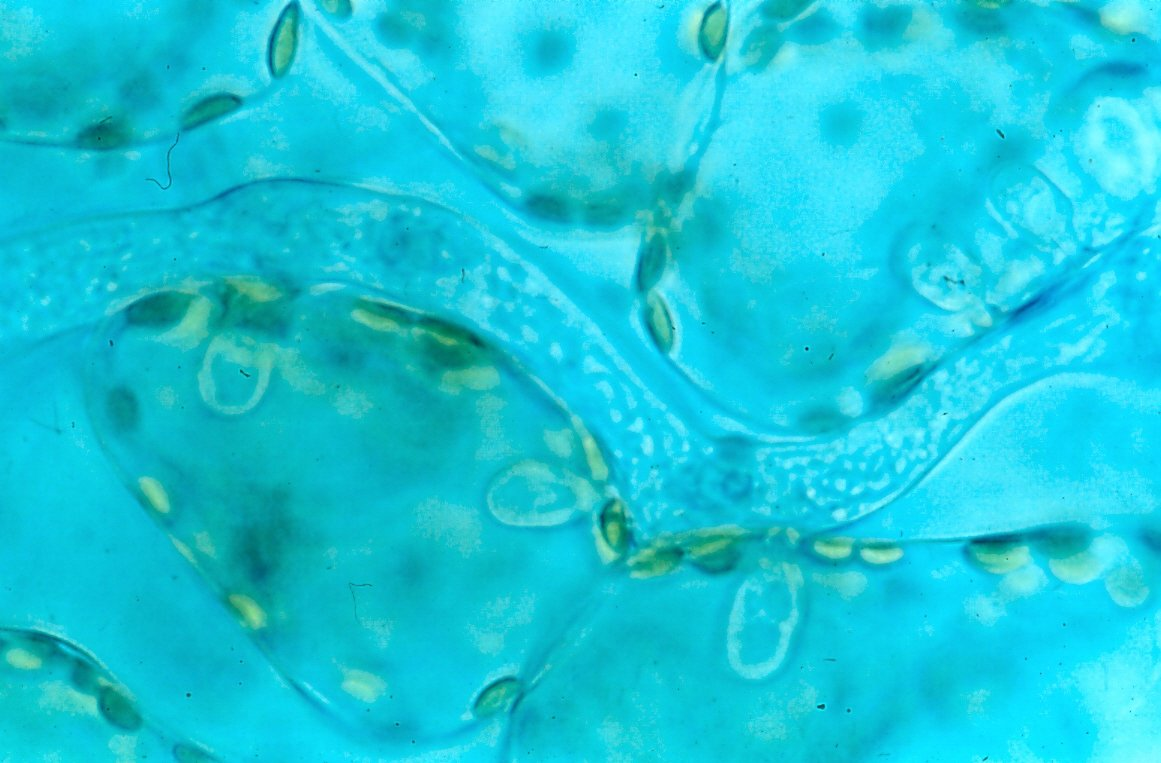
Haustoria

== Description ==
- Coarse intercellular mycelium.
- Haustoria are sac-shaped, many times they are present in each host cell.
- Sporangiophores emerge singly or in small groups through the stomata and branch dichotomously.
- Tip of each branch expands to form a cup-shaped disc bearing short cylindrical sterigmata at the margin and occasionally in the centre, and from these the hyaline sporangia arise.
- Germination of the sporangia is usually by means of a germ tube which forms an appressorium to penetrate epidermal cells or it enters through a stoma.
- Zoospore formation has been reported but not confirmed.
- Sexual reproduction is usually heterothallic, but homothallic strains also exist.
- Oospores are formed in leaf tissue and remain viable for 12 months.
