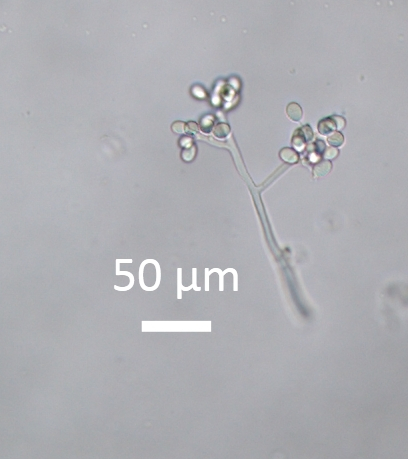
- Sporangium and spores of Plasmopara viticola

Scientific classification
- Domain: Eukaryota
- Clade: Sar
- Clade: Stramenopiles
- Phylum: Oomycota
- Class: Peronosporomycetes
- Order: Peronosporales
- Family: Peronosporaceae
- Genus: Plasmopara; J. Schröt.

Species
- Species include: Plasmopara geranii-sylvatici; Plasmopara halstedii; Plasmopara helianthi; Plasmopara lactucae-radicis; Plasmopara nivea; Plasmopara obducens; Plasmopara penniseti; Plasmopara pygmaea; Plasmopara viticola

= Plasmopara =

Genus of downy mildews

Plasmopara is a genus of Oomycota. Plasmopara species are plant pathogens, causing downy mildew on carrot, parsley, parsnip, chervil, and impatiens.
