= Graminivora =

Scientific classification
- Domain: Eukaryota
- Clade: Diaphoretickes
- Clade: SAR
- Clade: Stramenopiles
- Phylum: Oomycota
- Order: Peronosporales
- Family: Peronosporaceae
- Genus: Graminivora; Thines & Göker, 2006

Synonyms
- Bremia graminicola Naumov, Bull. Soc. mycol. Fr. 29(2): 275 (1913); Bremia graminicola var. indica Patel, Indian Phytopath. 1(2): 106 (1949)

Graminivora is a monotypic genus of oomycete belonging to the family Peronosporaceae. It only contains one known species; Graminivora graminicola (Naumov) Thines & Göker
