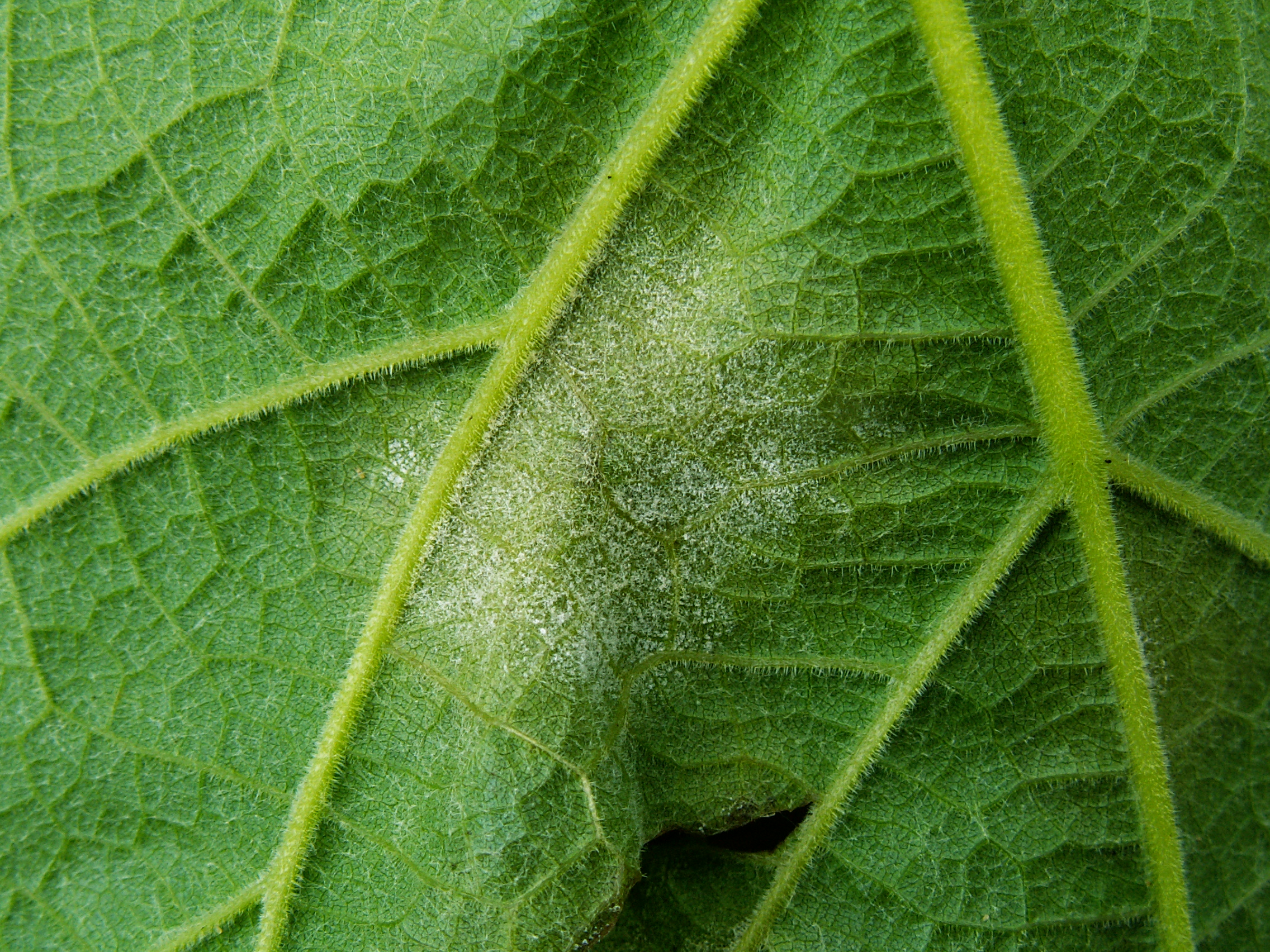

Scientific classification
- Domain: Eukaryota
- Supergroup: Stramenopiles
- Division: Oomycota
- Class: Peronosporomycetes
- Order: Peronosporales
- Family: Peronosporaceae
- Genus: Plasmopara
- Species: P. viticola

Binomial name
- Plasmopara viticola (Berk. & M.A. Curtis) Berl. & De Toni, (1888)

Synonyms
- Botrytis viticola Berk. & M.A. Curtis, (1848); Peronospora viticola (Berk. & M.A. Curtis) de Bary, (1863); Plasmopara amurensis Prots., (1946); Rhysotheca viticola (Berk. & M.A. Curtis) G.W. Wilson, (1907)

= Plasmopara viticola =

Species of single-celled organism

Plasmopara viticola, the causal agent of grapevine downy mildew, is a heterothallic oomycete that overwinters as oospores in leaf litter and soil. In the spring, oospores germinate to produce macrosporangia, which under wet condition release zoospores. Zoospores are splashed by rain into the canopy, where they swim to and infect through stomata. After 7–10 days, yellow lesions appear on foliage. During favorable weather the lesions sporulate and new secondary infections occur.

== Description ==
Plasmopara viticola, also known as grape downy mildew, is considered to be the most devastating disease of grapevines in climates with relatively warm and humid summers. It was first observed in 1834 by Schweinitz on Vitis aestivalis in the southeastern United States. Shortly after this first observation, the pathogen was introduced to European countries where it played a devastating role in the yield and production of their grapes, and consequently their wine. France was among the first of the European countries to gain experience in dealing with the pathogen. Within just a few years of the pathogen's introduction the French attempted to graft American root stock to their own vines in order to produce a more resistant strain of grape. Depending on the year, production of grapes in France has been estimated to have been reduced by as much as 50%. Because of numbers and results like these, downy mildew has been considered the most devastating disease of a filamentous pathogen to affect European vineyards. When comparing three grape producers in Europe, including some fields that were treated with fungicides or other management strategies, the economic losses ranged from ~2000 euros per hectare to ~4250 euros per hectare.

Symptoms cover a fairly large range depending mostly on the host. Common symptoms include necrosis of the stem or shoot, discoloration including brown spotting (lesions) and yellowish-green tips of the leaves. Grapes may exhibit sporangia and sporangiophores, appearing as white to gray coat on the outer surface.

Downy mildew has a specific set of environmental conditions to reproduce and infect. A warm, moist, and humid environment is required. Studies in Sicily have shown optimum time for oospore germination is between the end of February and the middle of March. With this understanding, if fungicides are used just before optimum conditions occur, they have proven to be an effective control method of the pathogen. Other control methods include proper watering, and a good location where the plant can receive continual sunlight.

== Disease cycle ==
Oospores are the sexual structures resulting from the fertilization of oogonia by antheridia, that typically occurs in late summer. The pathogen can survive winter as oospores in host tissue like dead leaves on the vineyard floor. There they can survive up to 3–5 years, possibly up to 10 years. Oospores may also be released from decaying plant material on soil surfaces.

The "rule of thumb", 10:10:24, refers to the required environmental condition for primary infection. At least 10mm rainfall (or irrigation) is needed while the temperature should be 10 °C or more over 24 hours. Under favorable conditions, oospores would germinate.

In spring the oospores would produce sporangia, which then produce zoospores, the swimming spores. Zoospores and sporangia can be dispersed by rain and wind to some lower tissue of the grapevines.

Sporangia can decline in viability over time. After 10 days in a 15°C humid chamber sporangia will die. Sporangia that are exposed to direct light for over 15 minutes will not survive.

Once the zoospores are produced and land on the host plant tissue, the primary infection would occur. Primary infection is from soil to vine. Zoospores encyst and then germinate. The germ tubes would be formed and then invade into the plant tissue via stomates. After infection, there would be oil spots on the leaf surface.

Active oil spots are necessary for secondary infection and sporangia are responsible for this process. Secondary infection is from leaf to leaf, shoot, inflorescence, berries, and stalk. The sporangia, seen as the white fungal-like organism on the downside of the leaves, are produced after a warm and high humid night. The sporangia can then be dispersed by wind or rain to occur secondary infections. Sporangia is the asexual reproduction structure, which then produce sporangiophores. The secondary infection is repeatable as long as under suitable conditions.

== Hosts and symptoms ==
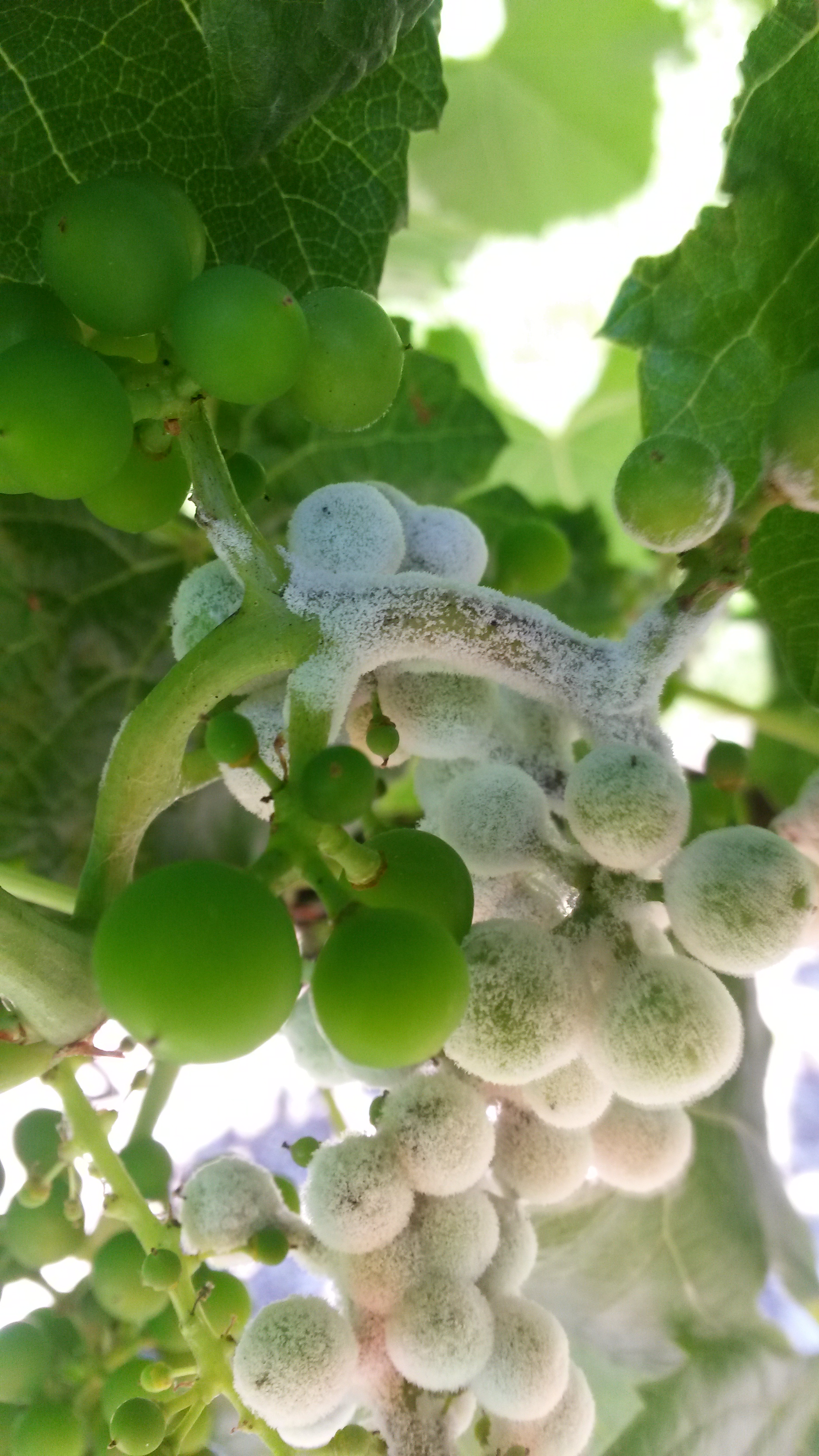
Sporangia and sporangiophores protruding from the stomates of the grape berries

The hosts of Plasmopara viticola includes the species Vitis vinifera and all cultivars within the species. It also can affect any interspecific hybrids within the Vitis genus. There is also some susceptibility in the Vitis labrusca species, ranging from highly susceptible to resistant. The European cultivar is most susceptible to the pathogen, as it lacks evolutionary resistance that the American varieties have, because the pathogen originated in the Americas and was later transmitted into Europe. North American species are also susceptible but varies from high susceptibility to resistance. In the regions with high annual rainfall, the grapevines may suffer more from this disease.

=== Leaves ===
The first symptom of downy mildew of grapes usually can be seen on leaves after 5 to 7 days of primary infection. Early in the season (spring), Yellow circular spots with oily appearances is going to present on foliage along with the veinlets. Note that, in some red grape varieties, the spots may in red color. The young oil-spots are surrounded by brown-yellow halos. As the oil-spots get mature, the halo would fade. As the oil spots age and develop, infected tissue would become necrotic and nonreproductive, due to cell death. If under appropriate weather conditions, a larger number of oil-spots can develop, expand, and cover most of the leaf surfaces.

After a warmer and humid night, a white downy fungal growth (sporangia) would be abundant on the downsides of the leaves and other infected plant areas. The severely infected portion could die. Severely infected leaves may drop from the plant.

The pathogen may also attack the old leaves in late summer. The infected old leaves may present a mosaic pattern with yellow to red-brown spots on the upside of the leaves' surface.

=== Other parts ===
The shoots of the plant can also be infected and shown as the same oily patches. After a warm humid night, these oily patches may also sporulate and be covered with white fungal growth. The shoots are may also be distorted or curled after infection. The rachises and shoots that are elongating may show epinasty or "shepherd's crook" symptoms [6].

The grape fruits may also have the symptoms in the later season. The infected berries would turn brown, wither, and then die finally. The infected green fruit may turn light brown and purple. White fungal growth(sporulation) can abundant on the grapes during humid weather. Infected grapes are easy to detach from the pedicles. However, the fruits become resistant to infection around 2–3 week after blooming, excluding the rachis. The rachis becomes resistant only around 2 months after blooming.

If the young bunch stalk is infected, oily brown sites can be seen. The infected inflorescence or bunches would wither rapidly. Infected inflorescence would eventually turn to brown, which means the death of the bunches.

== Pathogenesis ==
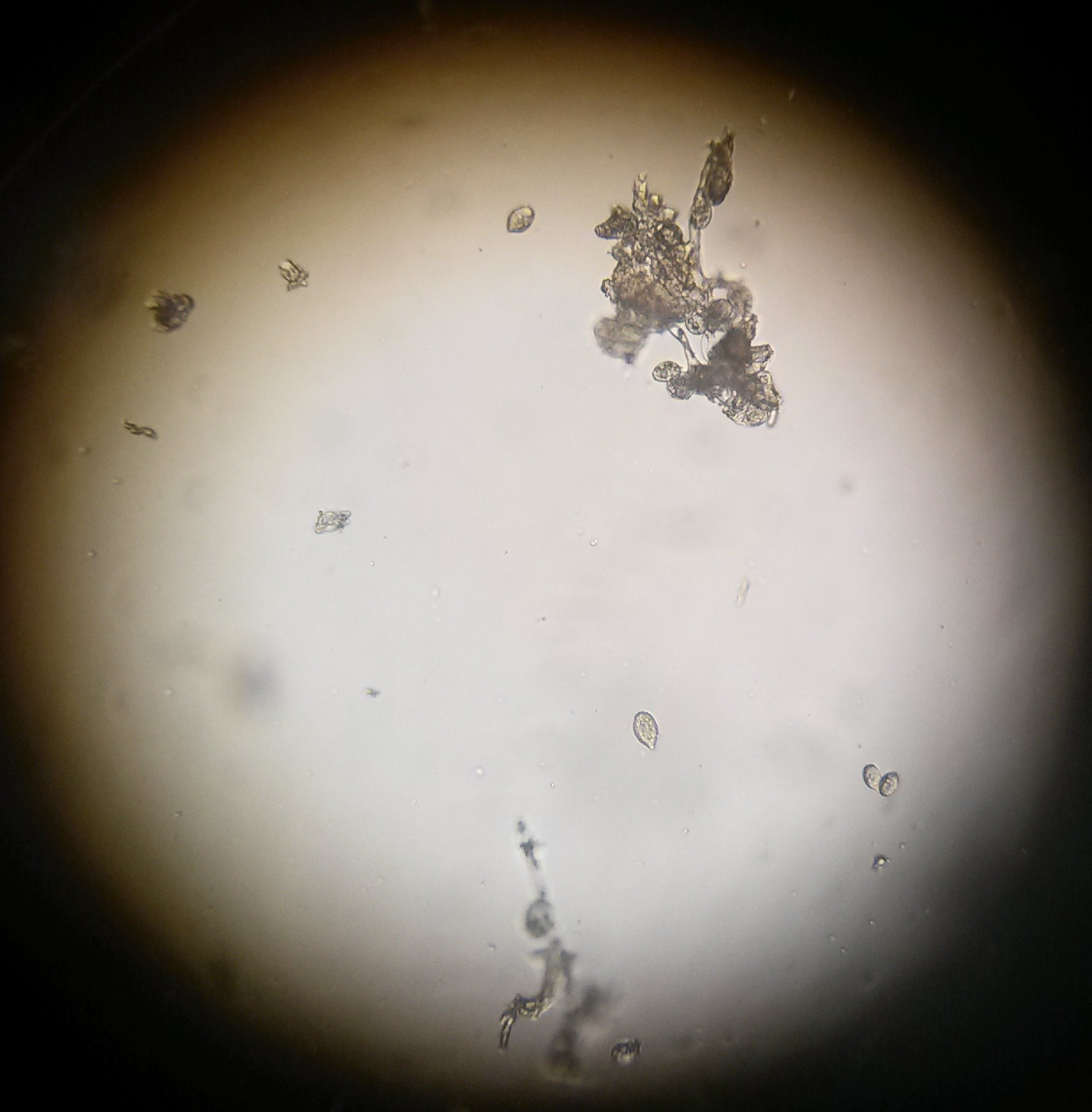
Lemon-shaped sporangia of Plasmopara viticola

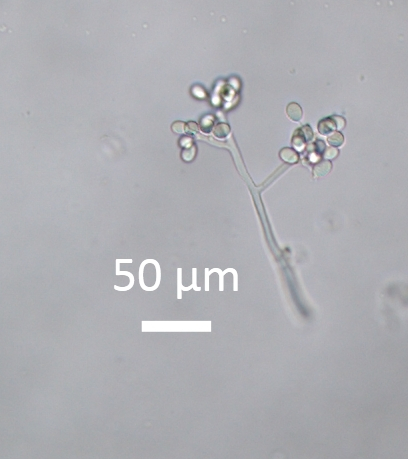
Sporangium and spores of Plasmopara viticola

The disease development of grape downy mildew is known to be heavily reliant on the efficiency of the asexual propagation cycles. Kiefer et al. (2002) demonstrated that the early development of Plasmopara viticola is regulated specifically and coordinately by unknown factors originating from the host grapevine plant Vitis vinifera. The host factors influence the pathogen development in three ways: (i) accelerating the release of zoospores from mature sporangia, (ii) coordinating the morphogenesis of the germ tube through the reorientation of the polarity of the zoospores during the attachment to the host cell, and (iii) targeting the zoospores to the stomata by active chemotaxis from the open substomatal cavity. The expression of pathogenesis-related (PR) genes by the host plant V.vinifera during the infection of P.viticola has been investigated over the years. The expressions of PR-2, PR-3 and PR-4 genes are induced in the grapevine host during pathogen infection, which encode for cell wall-degrading enzymes B-1,3-glucanase (PR-2) and chitinases (PR-3 and PR-4). It was previously understood that oomycetes differ from true fungi by the presence of cellulose in the oomycetes' cell walls as opposed to chitin in true fungi. However, it was found that chitin synthesis is regulated during in planta growth and asexual propagation of P.viticola and this is further demonstrated by the presence of chitin on the cell walls of the hyphae, sporangiophores and sporangia of the grape downy mildew pathogen. Hence, both the cell wall-degrading enzymes are synthesized by the host grapevine plant specifically to target and degrade the cell walls of the oomycete pathogen. In addition, the upregulation of the PR-9 gene that encodes for peroxidase, which is a reactive oxygen species is associated with the systemic acquired defense of the grapevine host. The roles of other constitutively expressed PR genes during P.viticola infection such as PR-5, PR-1 and PR-10 genes remain ambiguous. PR-5 is involved in the synthesis of thaumatin-like proteins and osmotins, which are believed to inhibit the spore germination and germ tube growth of Plasmopara viticola by creating transmembrane pores.

== Management ==
The history of downy mildew control began with an accidental discovery in 1882. In order to prevent passersby from eating from grapevines close to the road, Pierre-Marie-Alexis Millardet sprayed those vines with a mixture of copper sulfate and lime, which was both seeable and awful-tasting. He then noticed that the treated grapevines did not show any symptoms of downy mildew, whereas the rest of the vineyard was infected by the disease. After further studies, Millardet published the recommended treatment of the grapevines against the downy mildew in 1885 in which he proposed the use of 8:15:100 of copper sulfate: hydrated lime: water mixture in the treatment (later named as Bordeaux mixture after the Bordeaux region where Millardet conducted the research). The treatment of Bordeaux mixture against the downy mildew was well-received globally due to its strong adhesion to the leaves, its long perseverance in the vineyard, and its color, which allows for observable distribution of the treatment.

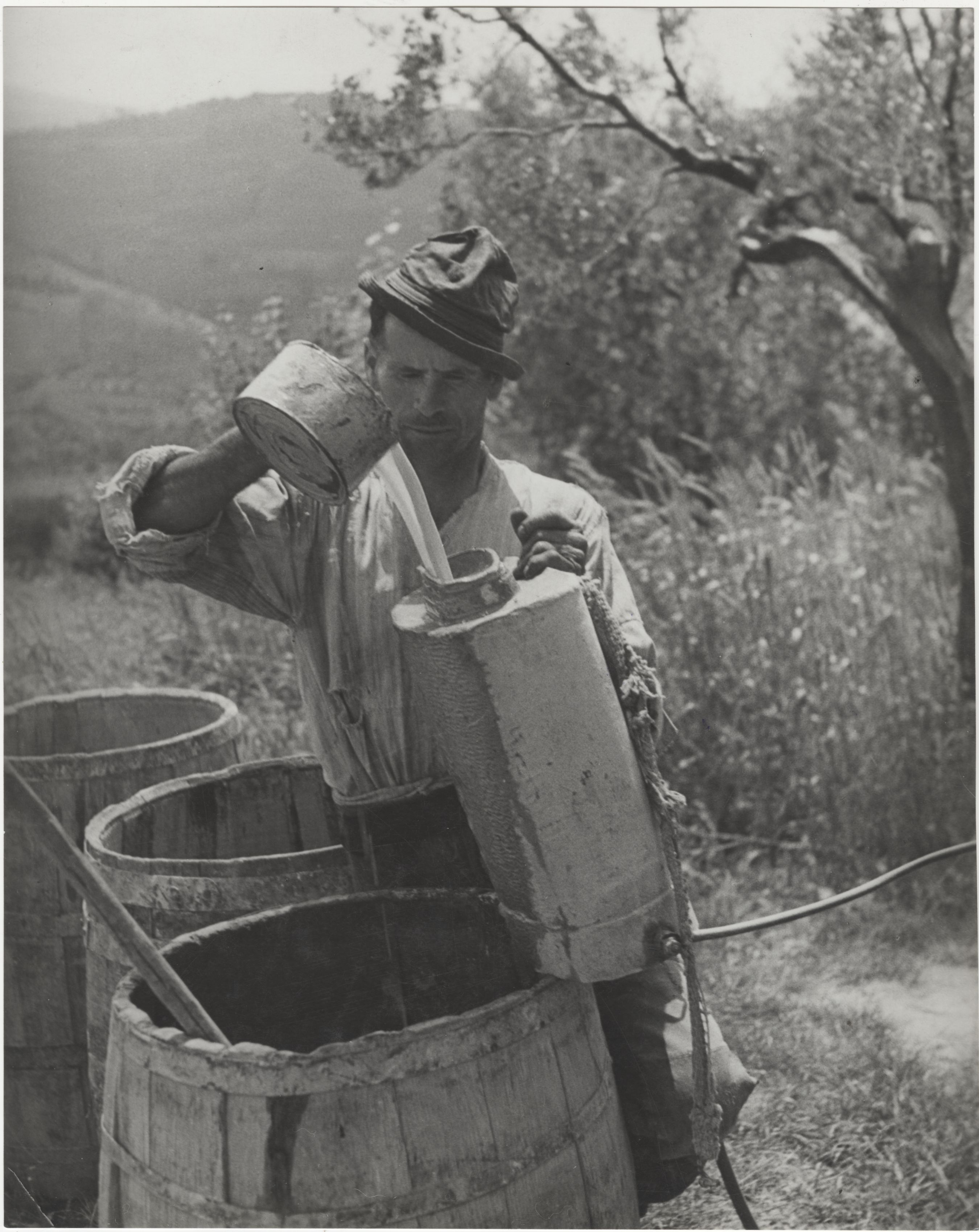
The use of copper in viticulture in 1940

Copper-based control methods are still commonly used today. As science became more precise, the amounts of copper-sulfate used in solution were optimized for best control of the Higher concentrations of copper-sulfate (3–4%) are recommended for high risk conditions, while low concentrations (1–1.5%) are for low risk conditions. The risk of susceptibility for the plant is highly correlated with the season. Most of the ineffectiveness in fungicide use is correlated with spraying at inappropriate times. It is necessary to spray right before budding in the spring. Furthermore, coating the entire leaf with a film of the fungicide is necessary for control; thinning the foliage makes achieving an entire coat possible. However, overusing chemical controls with copper can create harmful non-target effects. Copper can negatively impact the biological diversity in the soil and groundwater.

Unlike in Vitis vinifera, there is a wide range of susceptibility to downy mildew among Vitis interspecific hybrids. For example, among North American grapevine species, Vitis aestivalis and Vitis labrusca are moderately susceptible while Vitis cordifolia, Vitis rupestris and Vitis rotundifolia are relatively resistant. Certain Vitis interspecific hybrid cultivars display organ-specific resistance. For example, leaves of Aurore and Delaware cultivars are moderate to highly susceptible, whereas their fruit are highly resistant to downy mildew. Another example is the cultivar Chancellor in which the leaves exhibit moderate levels of resistance to downy mildew, while the clusters, tendrils and shoot tips are highly susceptible to the disease. Several new European cultivars such as Regent have been developed from progeny of crosses between V. vinifera and resistant North American species in an effort to incorporate the most desirable qualities of both parental branches.

Note that, berries become resistant to infection after 2 to 3 weeks after bloom, other parts of the plants may remain susceptible 2 months after bloom.

=== Cultural management ===
Reduce the risk of disease when establishing the vineyards. This practice includes choosing the location, drainage, soil, and irrigation system.

Avoid the distribution of infected soil and plant tissue from equipment. Carefully clean the equipment or change equipment after used in the infected areas. Also, carefully clean the boots or clothes after entering the infected areas.

Canopy management practices, such as low planting density, vine trimming, and hedging, and later shoot thinning, can improve the air movement and make the leaves drier.

=== Genetic resistances ===
Investigating in wild grape varieties to increase the genetic resistance. Develop the breeding of disease-resistant cultivars. Resistant cultivars can be useful and efficient to avoid infection.

=== Monitoring ===
Automatic weather stations can be established for monitoring and predicting weather events. Collecting data from temperature, rainfall, leaf wetness, and humidity.

=== Chemical control ===
Pre-infection fungicides prevent the zoospores to enter the leaf stomates. Also, post-infection fungicides can be used as soon as possible after infection to kill the pathogen tissues inside the leaves. Chemical pesticides are useful methods to control this pathogen and downy mildew.

=== Biological control ===
Biological agents, like Epicoccum nigrum link, can inhibit the spread of spores of Plasmopara viticola. Microorganisms can be used to biocontrol plant disease. However, microbial control agents do not work well. A recent study (2020) has shown that the bacteria Ochrobactrum sp. may be a promising future biological control. However, there are no reports of the grape industry that have used the bacteria Ochrobactrum sp. as a control of grape downy mildew.

== Taxonomy ==
In 1848, Berkeley and Curtis made reference to a downy mildew on grapevines, and, in a footnote, named it Botryis viticola. However, Botryis viticola was a nomen nudum. It was later transferred to Peronospora and then to Plasmopara. In 1907, Wilson erected Rhysotheca with P. viticola as the type; however, the name Rhysotheca viticola never caught on. In 1946, a strain on Vitis amurensis was raised to the species level as P. amurensis. In 1955, Golovina named the varieties americana, aneurensis, and parthica. In 1951, Alice Săvulescu and Traian Săvulescu named the formae speciales viniferae-ampelopsidis, aestivalis-labruscae, and silvestris based on host and morphology. Later authors synonymized all these names back into P. viticola. A population level analysis of P. viticola from the United States of America revealed the presence of four lineages that correspond to the host that could be distinguished based on molecular phylogenetics, morphology, and cross-inoculation experiments: P. viticola f. sp. quinquefolia, P. viticola f. sp. vinifera, P. viticola f. sp. aestivalis, and P. viticola f. sp. riparia. Further study recognized an additional lineage: P. viticola clade vulpina. The lineage Plasmopara f. sp. quinquefolia has been named Plasmopara muralis.
