= Viennotia =

Scientific classification
- Domain: Eukaryota
- Clade: Sar
- Clade: Stramenopiles
- Clade: Pseudofungi
- Phylum: Oomycota
- Class: Oomycetes
- Order: Peronosporales
- Family: Peronosporaceae
- Genus: Viennotia; M.Göker, H.Voglmayr, A.Riethmüller, M.Weiß & F.Oberwinkler
- Species: V. oplismeni

Binomial name
- Viennotia oplismeni (Vienn.-Bourg.) Göker, Voglmayr, Riethm., M. Weiss & Oberw.

Synonyms
- Plasmopara oplismeni Vienn.-Bourg., Bull. trimest. Soc. mycol. Fr. 75: 33 (1959)

Monotypic genus of oomycete

Viennotia is a monotypic genus of oomycete belonging to the family Peronosporaceae. It only contains one known species; Viennotia oplismeni (Vienn.-Bourg.) Göker, Voglmayr, Riethm., M. Weiss & Oberw. (2003)

The genus was circumscribed by M. Göker, Hermann Voglmayr, Alexandra Riethmüller, Michael Weiss and Franz Oberwinkler in Canad. J. Bot. vol.81 (7) on page 681 in 2003.

The genus name of Viennotia is in honour of George Viennot-Bourgin (1906–1986), who was a French Agronomist and botanist (Mycology). He was concerned with plant diseases in potatoes and especially in cereals. He also taught at the National School of Agronomy of Grignon.

It is a phylogeny relative of Graminivora graminicola.
