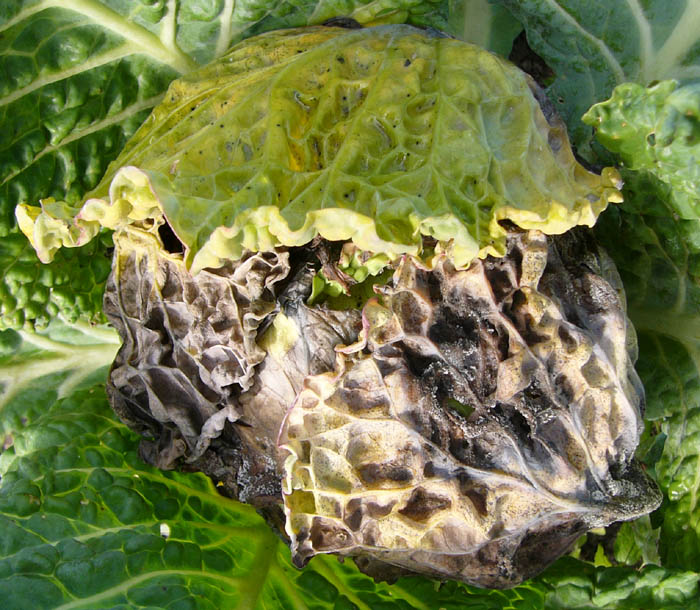
- Hyaloperonospora brassicae on cabbage

Scientific classification
- Domain: Eukaryota
- Clade: Sar
- Clade: Stramenopiles
- Phylum: Oomycota
- Class: Peronosporomycetes
- Order: Peronosporales
- Family: Peronosporaceae
- Genus: Hyaloperonospora
- Species: H. brassicae

Binomial name
- Hyaloperonospora brassicae (Gäum.) Göker, Voglmayr, Riethm., Weiss & Oberw., 2003

Synonyms
- Peronospora brassicae Gäum.; Peronospora parasitica subsp. brassicae (Gäum.) Maire

= Hyaloperonospora brassicae =

Species of single-celled organism

Hyaloperonospora brassicae, in the family Peronosporaceae, is a plant pathogen. It causes downy mildew of species of Brassica, Raphanus, Sinapis and probably other genera within the Brassicaceae. In the past, the cause of downy mildew in any plant in the family Brassicaceae was considered to be a single species Peronospora parasitica. However, this has recently been shown to be a complex of species with narrower host ranges, now classified in the genus Hyaloperonospora, for example Hyaloperonospora parasitica on the weed Capsella bursa-pastoris. From the perspective of plant pathology, Hyaloperonospora brassicae is now the name of the most important pathogen in this complex, attacking the major agricultural and horticultural Brassica species. Other significant Brassicaceous hosts are attacked by different species in the complex, e.g. horseradish (Armoracia rusticana) by Hyaloperonospora cochleariae, wallflower (Erysimum cheiri) by Hyaloperonospora cheiranthi.

Downy mildew is a disease of major importance on the horticultural Brassica species. It is most serious on the flowerhead types (cauliflower, broccoli), less serious on the leaf brassicas (cabbage, Brussels sprouts, and least serious on the root brassicas (turnips, swedes) and oil brassicas (rape). The pathogen persists as oospores in the soil. Attacks are most important in Brassica seedbeds, with infection appearing as yellow speckling of the upper surface of seedling leaves, and white mildew on the lower surface. Severely affected seedlings are stunted or killed. Similar symptoms appear on leaves in the field, causing premature senescence and favouring bacterial spoilage in the cold store after harvest. Affected Brussels sprouts show black spotting, which reduces their market quality. The heads of flowerhead brassicas can be severely affected, and become unmarketable.

Control by fungicide treatment is essential at the seed-bed stage, with reduction of humidity and leaf wetness as fas as possible. Similarly, flowerhead brassicas grown under protected conditions may require fungicide sprays. In the field, control relies on the use of healthy seedlings, adequate crop rotation and avoidance of unfavourable conditions. Fungicide sprays are not very effective. However, fungicides may in any case be used against white rust (Albugo candida), and these have some action against H. brassicae.
