= Poakatesthia =

Scientific classification
- Domain: Eukaryota
- Clade: Sar
- Clade: Stramenopiles
- Division: Oomycota
- Class: Peronosporomycetes
- Order: Peronosporales
- Family: Peronosporaceae
- Genus: Poakatesthia; Thines & Göker, 2007
- Species: P. penniseti

Binomial name
- Poakatesthia penniseti (R.G. Kenneth & J. Kranz, 1973)

Genus of plant pathogen

Poakatesthia is a genus of plant pathogen with only one species, Poakatesthia penniseti. Originality described as Plasmopara penniseti—part of the genus Plasmopara— it is a Downy mildew infecting pearl millet. A 2007 genetic analysis moved the P. penniseti to the new genus.

The generic name is a combination of the greek words for poa (grass) and katesthia (to consume).
