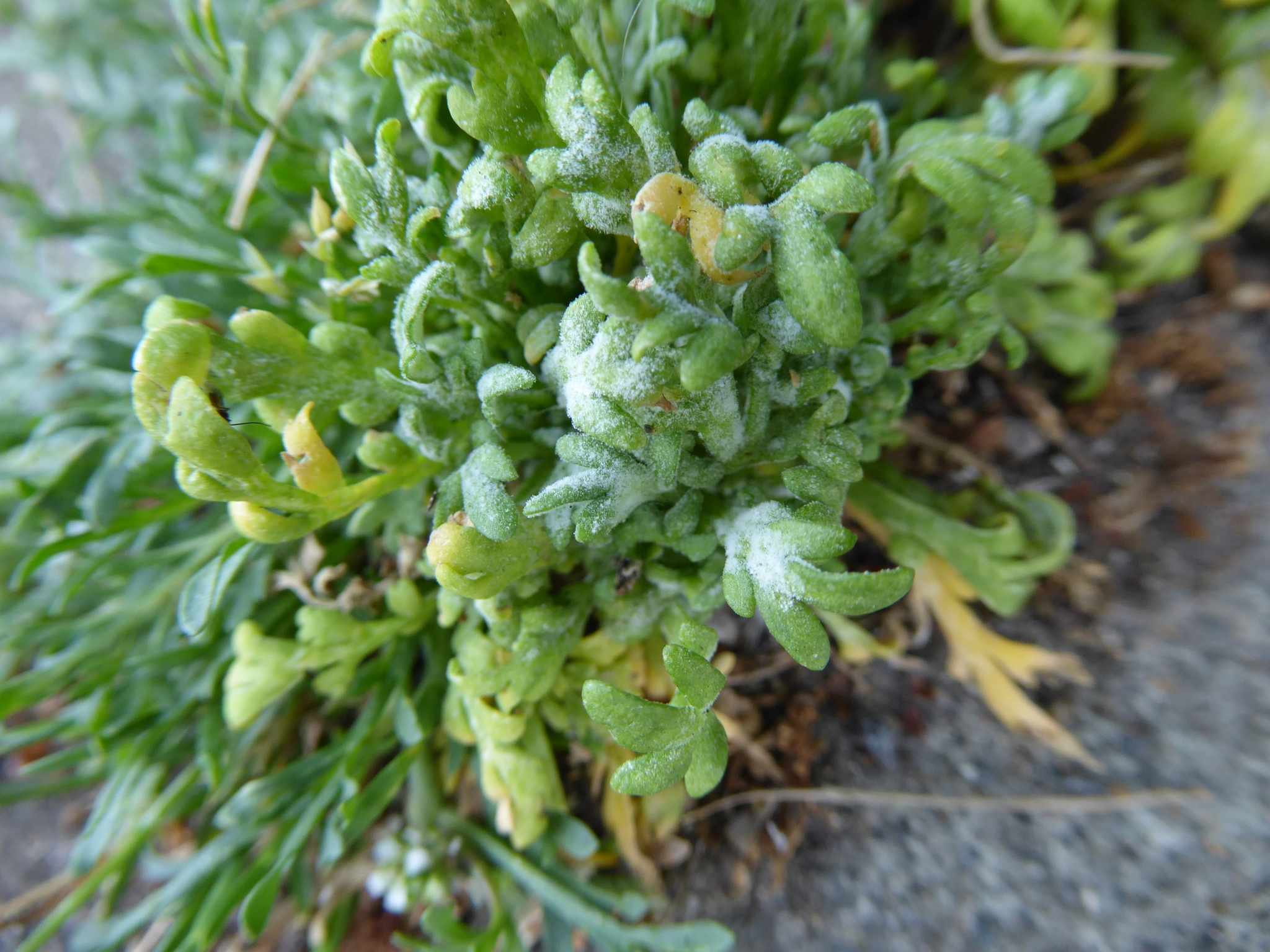
- Lepidium sp. infected by Perofascia lepidii. The leaves are stunted and the white conidiophores of Perofascia are visible.

Scientific classification
- Domain: Eukaryota
- Clade: Sar
- Clade: Stramenopiles
- Clade: Pseudofungi
- Phylum: Oomycota
- Class: Oomycetes
- Order: Peronosporales
- Family: Peronosporaceae
- Genus: Perofascia; Constantinescu

Species
- Perofascia lepidii

= Perofascia =

Genus of oomycetes

Perofascia is a genus of oomycetes in the family Peronosporaceae. Species in the genus are downy mildews that infect plants in the genus Lepidium (including species in the formerly separate genus Coronopus).
