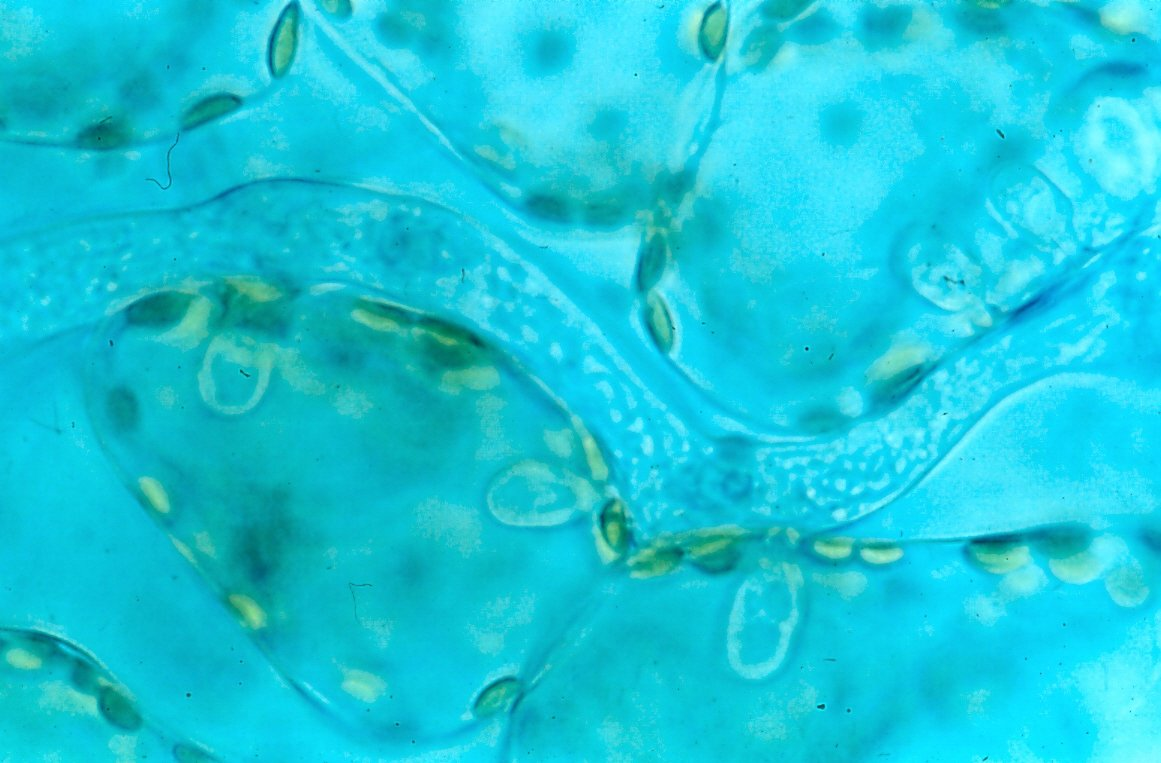
- Bremia lactucae haustoria

Scientific classification
- Domain: Eukaryota
- Clade: Sar
- Clade: Stramenopiles
- Division: Oomycota
- Class: Peronosporomycetes
- Order: Peronosporales
- Family: Peronosporaceae
- Genus: Bremia; Regel

Species
- See text

= Bremia (protist) =

Genus of single-celled organisms

Bremia is a genus of water moulds in the family Peronosporaceae.

The genus name of Bremia is in honour of Johann Jakob Bremi (1791–1857), a Swiss 'Kunsthandwerker' (artist wood turner) and entomologist from Zürich.

The genus was circumscribed by Eduard August von Regel in Bot. Zeitung (Berlin) Vol.1 on page 665 in 1843.

Members of the genus are obligate parasites whose hosts are members of the plant family Asteraceae, on which they form downy mildew. While previously thought to not be a particularly diverse genus with most records being attributed to the species Bremia lactucae (which is notorious for causing mildew on lettuce), which was supposed to attack a wide variety of plant species, recent genetic and detailed morphological analysis from the 2010s onward suggests that the genus is more diverse than previously supposed, and that many species are host-plant specific, resulting in the naming of a number of new species.

== Species ==
- Bremia o
- Bremia itoana
- Bremia blauvikensis
- Bremia polycephala
- Bremia sawadae
- Bremia pulchra
- Bremia vixobvia
- Bremia milovtzovae
- Bremia sonchi
- Bremia jagei
- Bremia graminicola
- Bremia lactucae
- Bremia krungthepmahanakhonamonrattanakosinmahintharayuthayamahadilokphopnoppharatratchathaniburiromudomratchaniwetmahasathanamonpimanawatansathitsakkathattiyawitsanukamprasitnonopsis
