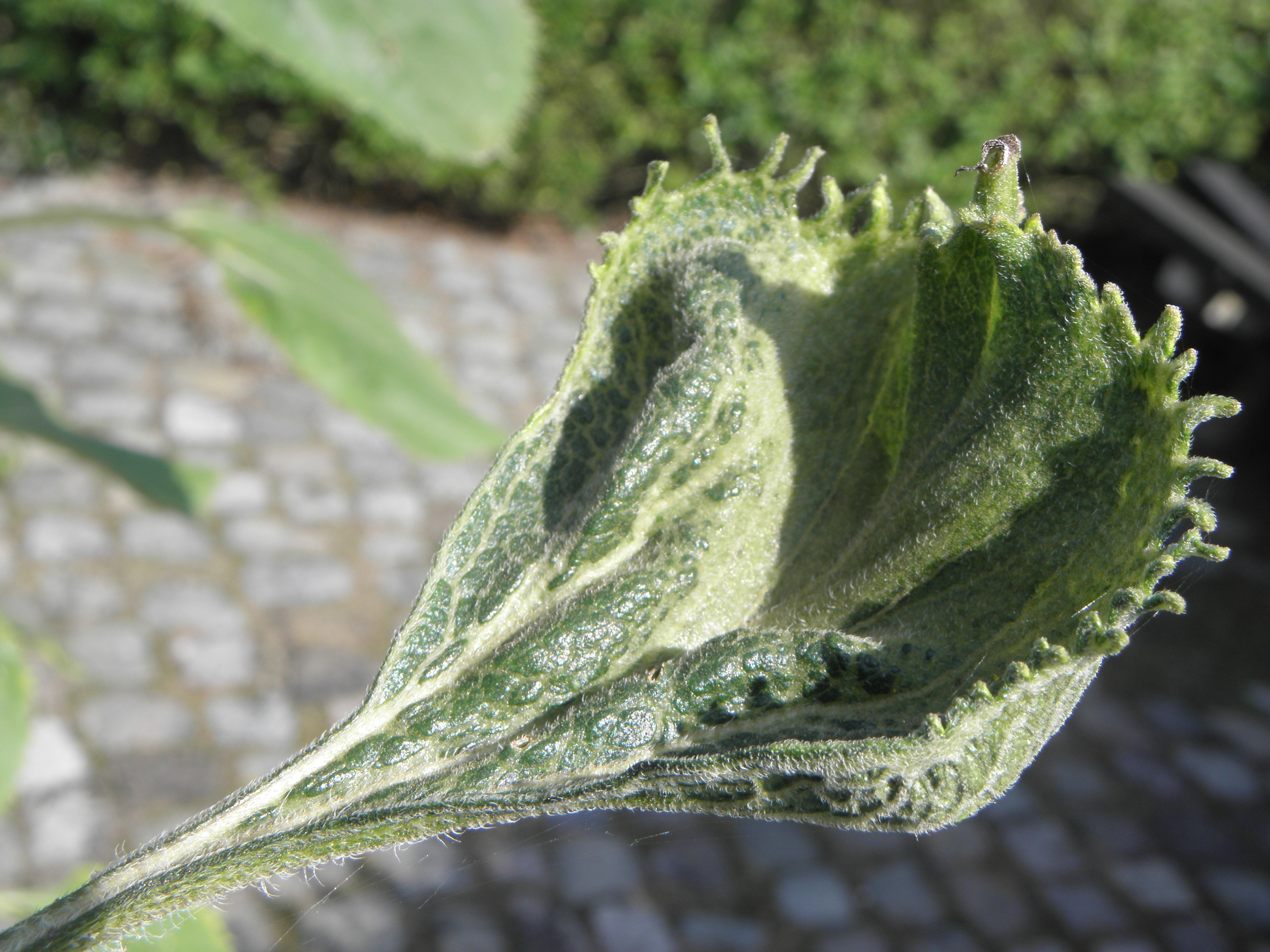

Scientific classification
- Domain: Eukaryota
- Supergroup: Stramenopiles
- Division: Oomycota
- Class: Peronosporomycetes
- Order: Peronosporales
- Family: Peronosporaceae
- Genus: Plasmopara
- Species: P. halstedii

Binomial name
- Plasmopara halstedii (Farl.) Berl. & De Toni, (1888)

Synonyms
- Peronospora halstedii Farl., (1882)

= Plasmopara halstedii =

Species of single-celled organism

Plasmopara halstedii is a plant pathogen infecting sunflowers. The species is one of many pathogens commonly referred to as downy mildew. P. halstedii originated in North America.

Plasmopara halstedii oospores produce a thin wall which are resistant structures, sexually produced that are essential for its continuation. After entering an area, the eradication of the pathogen is difficult due to the formation of oospores, which can remain viable in soil for many years.

== Hosts and symptoms ==
Plasmopara halstedii is an obligate biotroph that attacks the flowering plants of the family Asteraceae, found to infect the genus’ Helianthus, Bidens, Artemisia, and Xanthium. The pathogen has the strongest impact on Helianthus, degrading flower yields in the species H. argophyllus, H. debilis, H. petiolaris and H. annuus. H. annuus, the common sunflower, is also the most common host of P. halstedii. Xanthium strumarium, the common cocklebur, and Ambrosia artemisiifolia, or ragweed, have been shown to act as significant wild hosts.

Plasmopara halstedii causes significant yield losses due to the production of infertile sunflowers. Infertility due to P. halstedii is a result of sporulation on the flowering bodies as well as seed damping off due to root infection. Other symptoms include plant stunting, chlorosis, root browning and alteration of secondary metabolism of infected plants.

As an oomycete, P. halstedii releases motile zoospores as secondary inoculum. In these cases, secondary infection symptoms are much less severe than primary symptoms. A sign of the disease is the “typical downy appearance” resulting from sporulation on the bottom surface of the leaves.

== Detection ==
Systemically infected sunflower plants may have some degree of stunting and the leaves show pale green or chlorotic mottling which spreads along the main veins and over the lamella.

== Disease cycle ==
Plasmopara halstedii is a plant pathogenic oomycete, capable of overwintering in soil due to survival structures called oospores. For this reason, P. halstedii is a soil borne pathogen infecting the roots of the host plant. Oospores have the potential to live in soil up to 10 years, while oospore germination takes 10–30 days. Germination length depends on environmental condition and typically occurs in the spring. The germinating oospores form zoosporangia that release motile zoospores that germinate upon contact with root exudates.

After primary infection, zoospores serve as a main source of inoculum throughout the rest of the season. Zoospores germinate in about two hours and have two means of infection: direct penetration of the root through the use of an appresorium or infection due to an already present wound. Hyphae extend throughout the intercellular space, forming parasitic haustoria. The pathogen breaks through the surface of leaves and flowering structures through stomata. Asexual reproduction structures, called zoosporangiaphores, form at these sites. These structures release zoosporangia containing zoospores to other plants, the primary means of dissemination.

Sexual reproduction be either homothallic or heterothallic. Homothallic reproduction is characterized by the fusion of the asexual oogonium and antheridium. This fusion leads to the formation and release of sexual oospores, the primary inoculum for the next season. Heterothallic sexual reproduction is the fusion of sexual cells from two separate organisms, leading to "outcrossing".

== Management and control ==
Once the pathogen has been detected in an area, management is essential, as P. halstedii is nearly impossible to eradicate. Between long-surviving resting spores and high levels of secondary inoculum, P. halstedii can infect from 50% to 95% of sunflower yields in a single season.

Resistant sunflower strains are available, as two types of dominant major resistance genes have been identified, denoted as Pl. Type 1 resistance lacks infection above the base of the hypocotyl. Type 2 is characterized by a weak infection, with sporulation never reaching the upper region of the host. Resistant genes have been overcome in the past as the pathogen evolves and mutates, suggesting that resistance may not give the best results. However, due to the constant search for resistant sources from wild Helianthus, the gene pool of cultivars is frequently being used to produce new, commercially resistant strains.

Seed treatment has been shown to be effective in controlling the disease, as the establishment of P. halstedii in an area of soil is nearly irreversible. The compounds metalaxyl and oxadixyl have been shown to protect seeds in the case of infection, and treatments containing these compounds are commercially available. Fungicides seed dressings of this nature have also been shown to give significant control over the pathogen. However, some strains of P. halstedii have begun to show resistance to metalaxyl-based fungicides, reported in multiple countries. Alternate forms of resistance are being developed for the future, including the use of biological antagonists and defense-related proteins.

Australia is the leader in pest control of P. halstedii. In Australia, any imported seed is subject to hot-water treatment, fungicide dusting and monitoring for up to 3 years.
