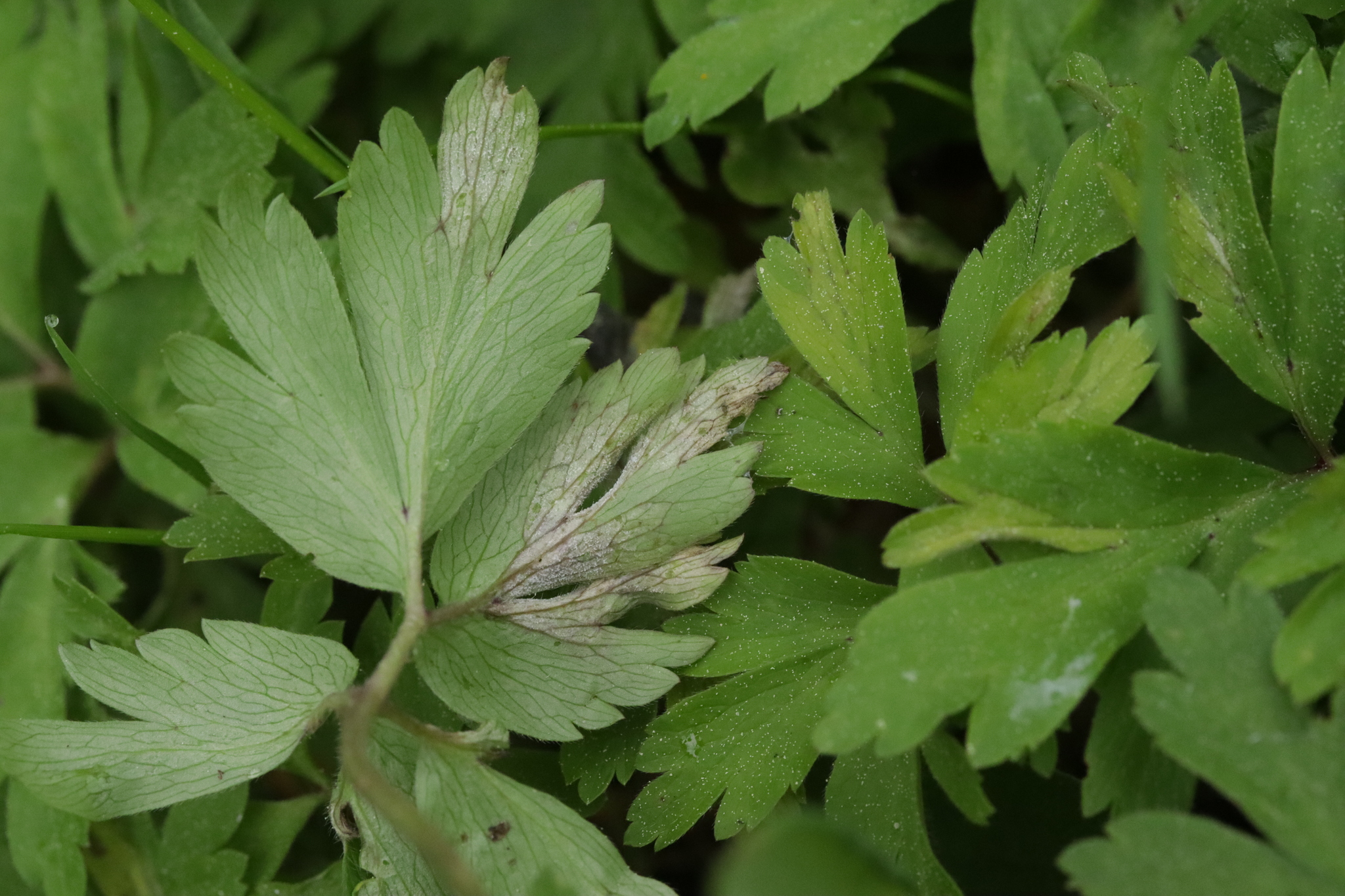
- Plasmoverna pygmaea on Anemone nemorosa.

Scientific classification
- Domain: Eukaryota
- Clade: Sar
- Clade: Stramenopiles
- Phylum: Oomycota
- Class: Peronosporomycetes
- Order: Peronosporales
- Family: Peronosporaceae
- Genus: Plasmoverna
- Species: P. pygmaea

Binomial name
- Plasmoverna pygmaea (Unger) Constant., Voglmayr, Fatehi & Thines, 2005

Synonyms
- Synonymy: Botrytis pygmaea Unger, 1832 [1833]; Peronospora pygmaea (Unger) Unger, 1847; Plasmopara pygmaea (Unger) J. Schröt, 1886 [1889]; Plasmopara pygmaea f. anemones Gapon., 1972; Plasmopara pygmaea f. delphinii Gapon., 1972

= Plasmoverna pygmaea =

Species of downy mildew

Plasmoverna pygmaea is a downy mildew infecting plant species in the Ranunculaceae.
