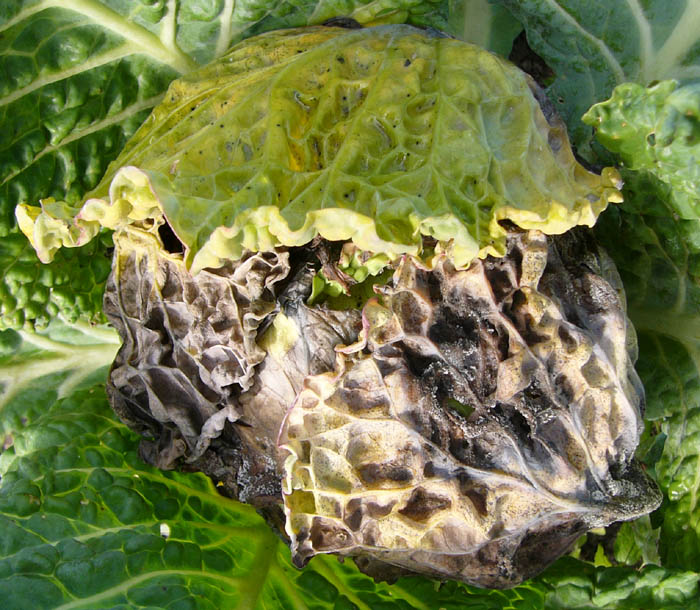
- Hyaloperonospora brassicae on cabbage

Scientific classification
- Domain: Eukaryota
- Clade: Sar
- Clade: Stramenopiles
- Phylum: Oomycota
- Class: Peronosporomycetes
- Order: Peronosporales
- Family: Peronosporaceae
- Genus: Hyaloperonospora; Constant.

= Hyaloperonospora =

Genus of single-celled organisms

Hyaloperonospora is a genus of oomycete, obligate, plant pathogens that was originally considered to be part of Peronospora. Species in this group produce a disease called downy mildew and can infect many important crops. From the 19 downy mildew producing genera, Hyaloperonospora has been grouped with Perofascia in the brassicolous downy mildews. In the group of downy mildews, Hyaloperonospora is the third biggest genus. The most famous species in the genus is the Hyaloperonospora parasitica, or also known as Hyaloperonospora arabidopsis. This species has become a model organism from its ability to infect the model plant Arabidopsis thaliana. It is used to study plant-pathogen interactions, and is currently the only Hyaloperonospora species that has an assembled genome.

== History ==
In 2002, Hyaloperonospora was discovered and described by Constantinescu, O. and Fatehi, J. using morphological and molecular characteristics. Later, Göker et al., also used molecular phylogenetic techniques showing that the group was different enough from the other Peronospora species to be its own taxon. Hyaloperonospora along with Perofascia were the first downy mildews described using their molecular phylogenies.

== Habitat and ecology ==
Hyaloperonospora can be found on plants from about 20 different tribes of Brassicaceae. They can generally be found anywhere their host plant grows, due to human transport from seed trade. Hyaloperonospora parasitica is unlike most other species in the family in that it has a very wide host range, infecting a variety of crops. Another important interaction is with Hyaloperonospora brassicae, which also has a wider host range infecting many Brassica species.

== General form and structure ==
Hyaloperonospora differs from Perofascia in that its sporangiophores are tree-like, its haustoria are lobate to globose, and the walls of its oospores are relatively thinner.

The life history does not differ from that of Peronospora, the genus that Hyaloperonospora species used to be classified under. It begins as sporangia, which are small spore-like structure, and when it lands next to a leaf stoma, it germinates a germ-tube. The germ tube enters the leaf cell creating a haustorium, which allows the mould the uptake nutrients from the leaf. The mould will continue to grow, with hyphae extending into the leaf's intercellular space. This invasion kills some of the leaf cells and the leaf will develop a lesion followed by necrosis. If the conditions are favourable, the mould will undergo asexual reproduction and produce a tree of sporangiophores out of the leaf. The sporangiophores will produce conidia that can be dispersed by the wind to another plant. If the conditions in the leaf were unfavourable, the mould can undergo sexual reproduction and produce haploid antheridia and haploid oogonia through meiosis. These two structures are the only non-diploid stages of the Hyaloperonospora. The antheridia will fuse to the oogonia inducing plasmogamy followed by karyogamy to form diploid oospores. The oospores will then be dispersed through the wind to infect more plants.

== Practical importance ==
Hyaloperonospora arabidopsis infects the model plant Arabidopsis thaliana, and by association has become a model pathogen for studying plant-pathogen interactions. Studying these interactions should give us insight into how we can more effectively protect our crops from deadly eukaryotic pathogens. It is also used as a model in the Arabidopsis eFP Browser as one of the nine biotic stresses.

== Genomics and genetics ==
The Hyaloperonospora arabidopsis genome was first sequenced and assembled in 2008 using Sanger and Illumina sequencing, by Baxter et al. They reported a genome size of 78 Mb with 9.5x coverage of the nuclear genome and did not assemble the mitochondrial genome. They also found that 42% of the genome consisted of repetitive elements. 14,543 protein coding genes were predicted using a program to detect gene models.

In 2015, two more isolates of Hyaloperonospora arabidopsis were sequenced using Illumina HiSeq with 90x coverage, and reported genome sizes of 70 Mb and 74 Mb.

Species include

- Hyaloperonospora arabidopsidis (Gäum.) Göker, Voglmayr, Riethm., Weiss & Oberw., 2003
- Hyaloperonospora brassicae (Gäum.) Göker, Voglmayr, Riethm., Weiss & Oberw., 2003
- Hyaloperonospora parasitica (Pers.) Constant., 2002
- Hyaloperonospora drabae
- Hyaloperonospora floerkeae (Kellerm.) Constant. 2002
- Hyaloperonospora camelinae
- Hyaloperonospora dentariae (Rabenh.) Voglmayr 2013
- Hyaloperonospora isatidis
- Hyaloperonospora erophilae
- Hyaloperonospora cardamines-enneaphyllos Voglmayr 2013
- Hyaloperonospora cheiranthi
- Hyaloperonospora arabidis-alpinae
- Hyaloperonospora sisymbrii-loeselii
- Hyaloperonospora sisymbrii-sophiae
- Hyaloperonospora malyi (Lindtner) Voglmayr 2013
- Hyaloperonospora tribulina (Pass.) Constant. 2002
- Hyaloperonospora barbareae
- Hyaloperonospora lobulariae
- Hyaloperonospora berteroae
- Hyaloperonospora galligena
- Hyaloperonospora hesperidis
- Hyaloperonospora dentariae-macrophyllae
- Hyaloperonospora cardamines-laciniatae
- Hyaloperonospora rorippae-islandicae
- Hyaloperonospora lunariae
- Hyaloperonospora cochleariae
- Hyaloperonospora lepidii-perfoliati (Savul. & Rayss) Constant. 2002
- Hyaloperonospora thlaspeos-perfoliati
- Hyaloperonospora nesliae
- Hyaloperonospora thlaspeos-arvensis
- Hyaloperonospora cardaminopsidis
- Hyaloperonospora nasturtii-aquatici
- Hyaloperonospora praecox
- Hyaloperonospora norvegica
- Hyaloperonospora niessliana (Berl.) Constant. 2002
