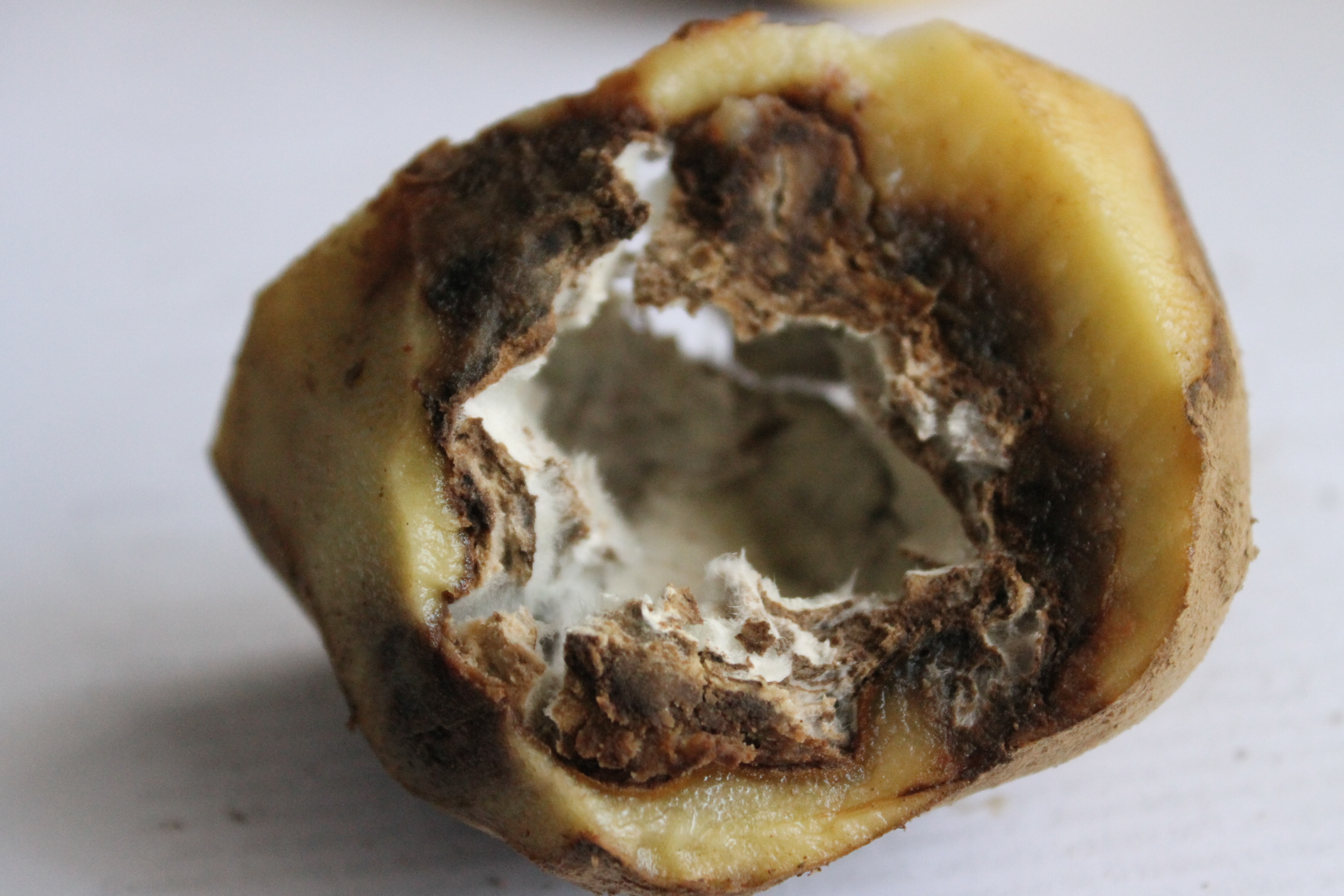
- Phytophthora infestans, or potato late blight

Scientific classification
- Domain: Eukaryota
- Clade: Sar
- Clade: Stramenopiles
- Phylum: Oomycota
- Class: Peronosporomycetes
- Order: Peronosporales
- Family: Peronosporaceae

Genera
- Baobabopsis; Basidiophora; Benua; Bremia; Calycofera; Eraphthora; Graminivora; Hyaloperonospora; Nothophytophthora; Novotelnova; Paraperonospora; Perofascia; Peronosclerospora; Peronospora; Phytophthora; Plasmopara; Plasmoverna; Protobremia; Pseudoperonospora; Sclerophthora; Sclerospora; Viennotia

= Peronosporaceae =

Family of water moulds

Peronosporaceae are a family of water moulds that contains 21 genera, comprising more than 600 species. Most of them are called downy mildews.

Many species of Peronosporaceae are obligate biotrophic plant pathogens. They parasitise their host plants as an intercellular mycelium using haustoria to penetrate the host cells. The downy mildews reproduce asexually by forming sporangia on distinctive white sporangiophores usually formed on the lower surface of infected leaves. These constitute the "downy mildew". The sporangia are wind-dispersed to the surface of other leaves. According to the genus concerned, the sporangia may then germinate by forming zoospores, thus resembling Phytophthora, or by germ-tube. In the latter case, the sporangia behave as conidia and are often referred to as such. Sexual reproduction is via oospores.

The parasitised plants are angiosperms or gymnosperms, and most Peronosporaceae are pathogens of herbaceous dicots. Some downy mildew genera have a more restricted host range, e.g. Basidiophora, Paraperonospora, Protobremia and Bremia on Asteraceae; Perofascia and Hyaloperonospora almost only on Brassicaceae; Viennotia, Graminivora, Poakatesthia, Sclerospora and Peronosclerospora on Poaceae, and Plasmoverna on Ranunculaceae. The largest genera, Peronospora and Plasmopara, collectively have very wide host ranges.

Peronosporaceae of economic importance include those that infect grapevines (Plasmopara viticola) and tobacco (Peronospora tabacina; blue mould). The latter species has such delicate spores that it times its spore release for sunrise, a time of high ambient moisture and dew accumulation, so that its spores are less likely to succumb to desiccation and light. Bremia lactucae is a parasite on lettuce, Plasmopara halstedii on sunflower.
