= Chamomile =

Common name for several daisy-like plants

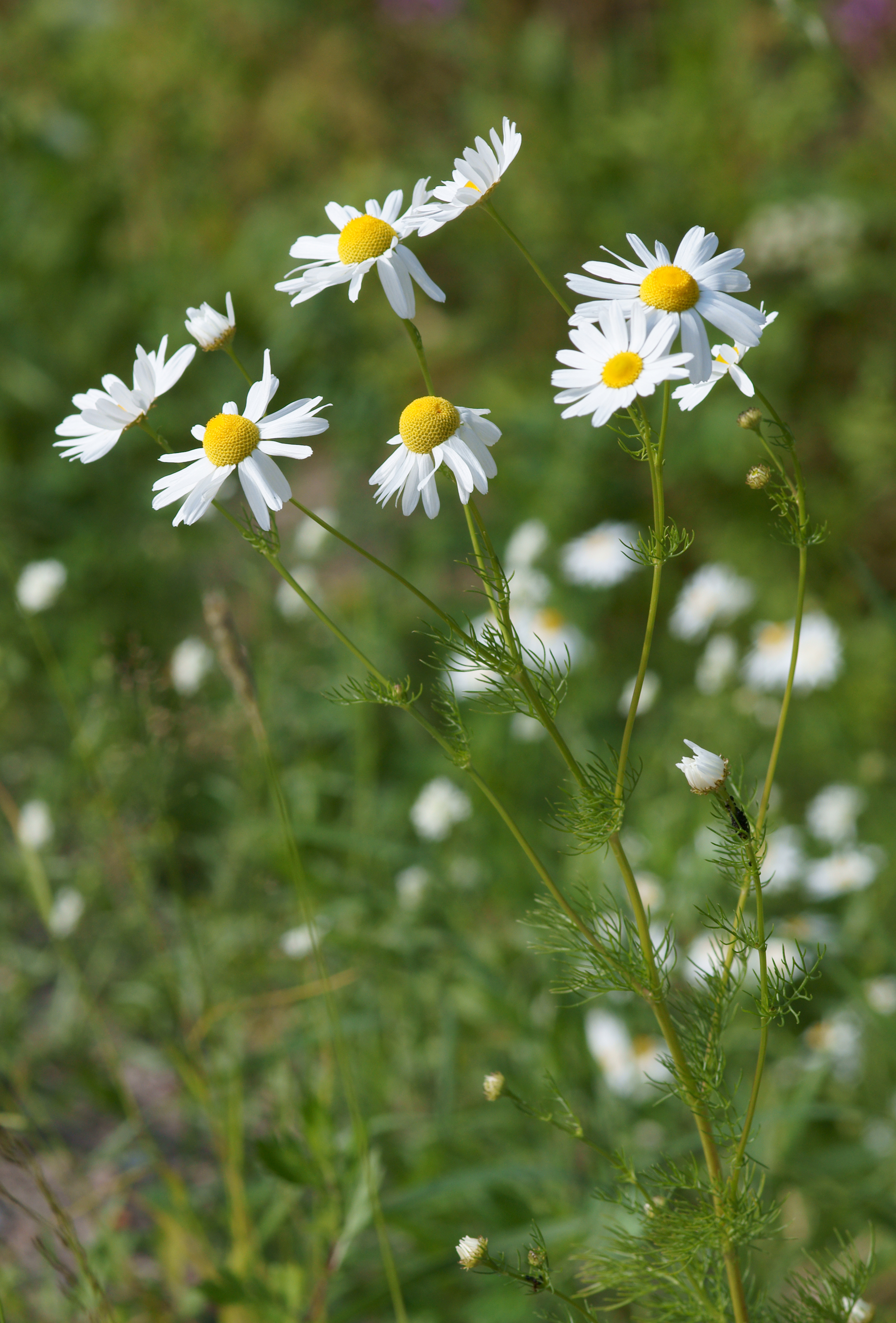
German chamomile, Matricaria chamomilla

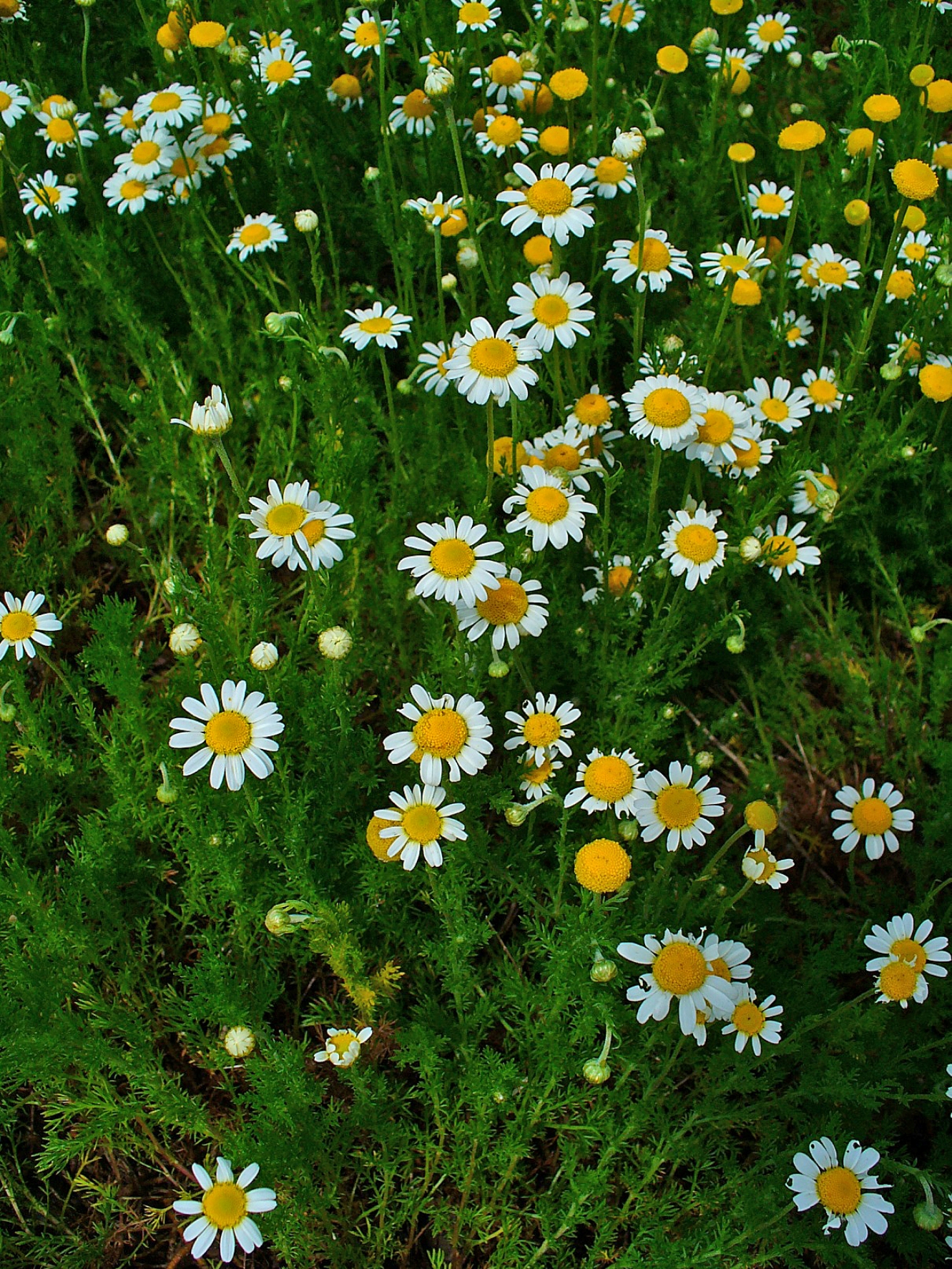
Roman chamomile, Chamaemelum nobile

Chamomile (American English) or camomile (British English; see spelling differences) (/ˈkæməmaɪl, -miːl/ KAM-ə-myle or KAM-ə-meel) is the common name for several daisy-like plants of the family Asteraceae. Two of the species, Matricaria chamomilla and Chamaemelum nobile, are commonly used to make herbal infusions for beverages. Chamomile is used as a flavoring in foods, beverages, and cosmetics, in herbal teas, in brewing beer, and as a ground cover or seating plant in gardens.

There is no clinical evidence supporting the effectiveness of consuming chamomile to treat any disease. Chamomile may interact adversely with various herbs and drugs, worsen pollen allergies, and is not recommended for people with hormone-sensitive conditions or when combined with anticoagulants. Because Roman chamomile may cause uterine contractions, it should not be used during pregnancy, and its safety during breastfeeding is unknown.

Chamomile is highly susceptible to numerous fungi, viruses, and insects, which collectively pose significant threats to its cultivation.

== Etymology ==
The word chamomile is derived via French and Latin, from the Greek χαμαίμηλον, khamaimēlon, 'earth apple', from χαμαί, khamai, 'on the ground', and μῆλον, mēlon, 'apple'. First used in the 13th century, the spelling chamomile corresponds to the Latin chamomilla and the Greek chamaimelon. The spelling camomile is a British derivation from the French.

== Species ==
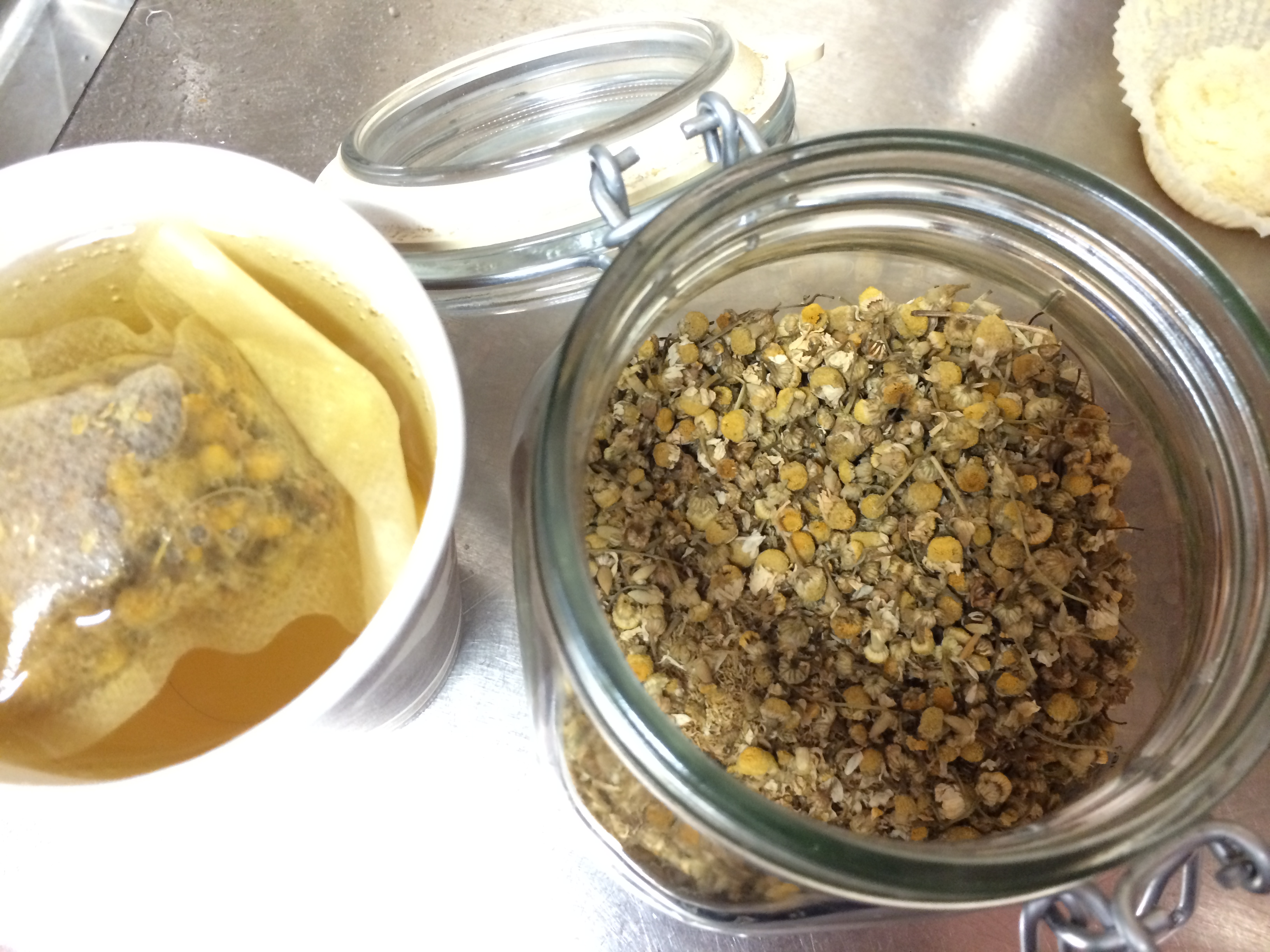
Loose-leaf chamomile tea

Some commonly used species include:

- Matricaria chamomilla – often called "German chamomile" or "Water of Youth"
- Chamaemelum nobile – Roman, English, or garden chamomile; also frequently used (C. nobile Treneague is normally used to create a chamomile lawn)

A number of other species' common names include the word chamomile. This does not necessarily mean they are used in the same manner as the species used in the herbal tea known as "chamomile". Plants including the common name chamomile, of the family Asteraceae, are:

- Anthemis arvensis – corn, scentless or field chamomile
- Anthemis cotula – stinking chamomile
- Cladanthus mixtus – Moroccan chamomile
- Cota tinctoria – dyer's, golden, oxeye, or yellow chamomile
- Eriocephalus punctulatus – Cape chamomile
- Matricaria discoidea – wild chamomile or pineapple weed
- Oncosiphon pilulifer – globe chamomile
- Tripleurospermum inodorum – wild, scentless or false chamomile

== Uses ==
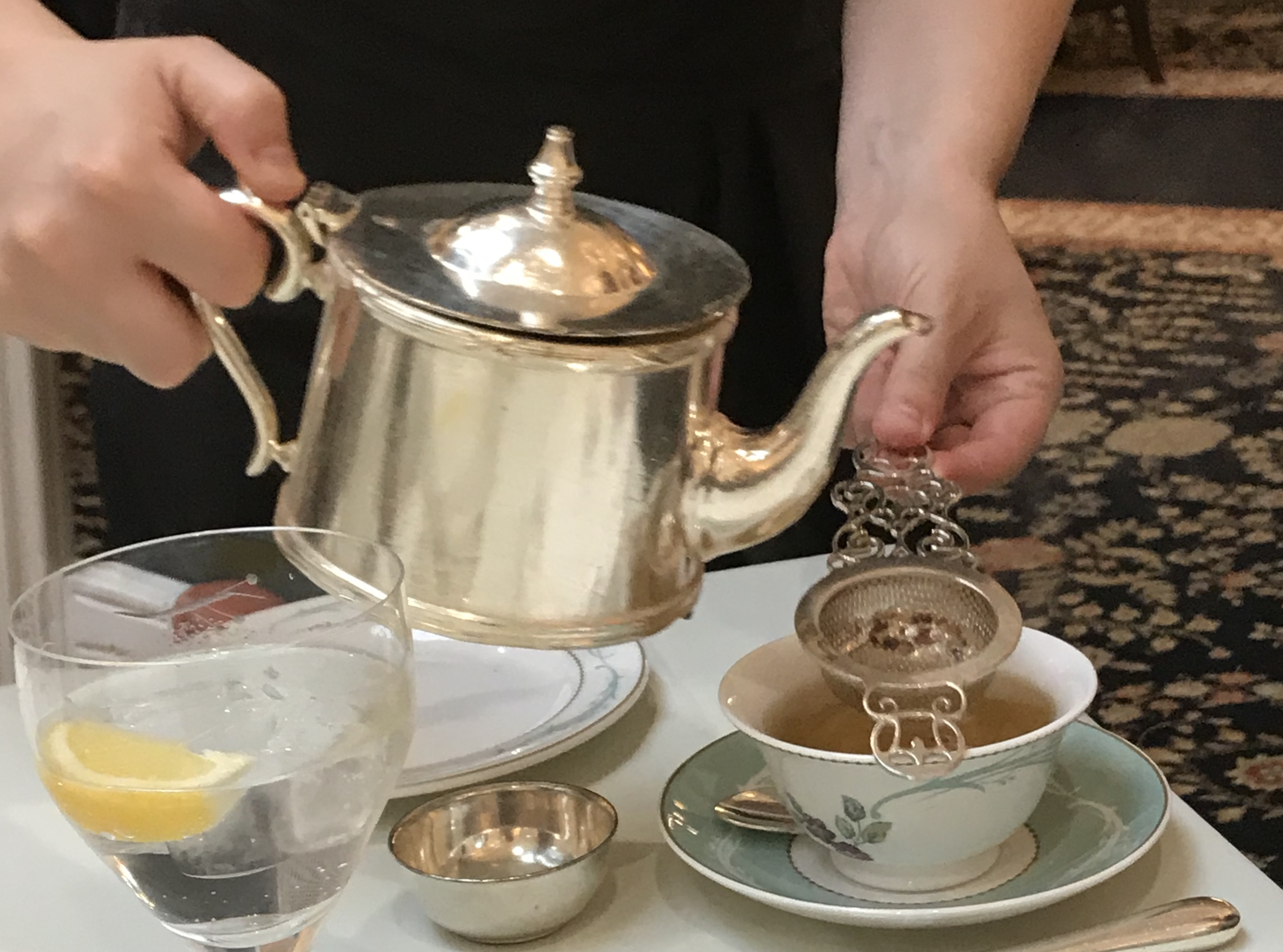
Chamomile tea being served at the Savoy Hotel in London, England

Chamomile may be used as a flavoring agent in foods and beverages, mouthwash, soaps, and cosmetics. Chamomile tea is a herbal infusion made from dried flowers and hot water. The entry for chamomile at the National Center for Complementary and Integrative Health (NCCIH) lists two types of chamomile, namely German chamomile and Roman chamomile; these are Matricaria chamomilla and Chamaemelum nobile, respectively. Chamomile has historically been used as one of the flavoring ingredients in beer, and is sometimes used by modern brewers. Usually the whole plant is used, adding a bitter flavor component.

Chamomile, chiefly Chamaemelum nobile cultivars, is used to "upholster" chamomile seats, raised beds which are about half a meter tall, and designed to be sat upon. Chamomile lawns are also used in sunny areas with light traffic.

== Research ==
There is no clinical evidence that chamomile is effective for treating any diseases. Chamomile is under preliminary research for its potential anti-anxiety properties. There is no good evidence that it is useful for treating insomnia.

=== Phytochemicals ===
The main compounds in chamomile flowers are coumarins, flavonoids, and polyphenols, including apigenin, quercetin, patuletin, luteolin, and daphnin.

== Drug interactions ==
The use of chamomile has the potential to cause adverse interactions with numerous herbal products and prescription drugs and may worsen pollen allergies. People who are allergic to daisies, chrysanthemums, marigolds, or ragweed (all with chamomile in the daisy family), may be allergic to chamomile. Chamomile contains coumarin, glycoside, herniarin, flavonoids, farnesol, nerolidol, and germacranolide. Despite the presence of coumarin, as chamomile's effect on the coagulation system has not yet been studied, it is unknown whether a clinically significant drug–herb interaction exists with anticoagulant drugs. However, until more information is available, it is not recommended to use these substances concurrently.

Chamomile should not be used by people with past or present cancers of the breast, ovary, or uterus; endometriosis; or uterine fibroids.

== Pregnancy and breastfeeding ==
Because chamomile has been known to cause uterine contractions that can invoke miscarriage, pregnant women are advised to not consume Roman chamomile (Chamaemelum nobile). Although oral consumption of chamomile is generally recognized as safe in the United States, there is insufficient clinical evidence about its potential for affecting nursing infants.

== Agriculture ==
The chamomile plant is known to be susceptible to many fungi, insects, and viruses. The following fungi are known to attack this plant: Albugo tragopogonis (white rust), Cylindrosporium matricariae, Halicobasidium purpureum, Peronospora leptosperma, Peronospora radii, Phytophthora cactorum, Puccinia anthemedis, Puccinia matricaiae, Septoria chamomillae, and multiple powdery mildew species. Also, yellow virus (Chlorogenus callistephi var. californicus Holmes, Callistephus virus 1A) causes severe damage to this plant. Aphids (Aphis fabae) have been observed feeding on chamomile plants and the moth Autographa chryson causes defoliation. The insect Nysius minor caused shedding of M. chamomilla flowers.

== Historical descriptions ==
Nicholas Culpeper's 17th century The Complete Herbal has an illustration and several entries on chamomel.
