= P. dianthi =

P. dianthi may refer to:

- Peronospora dianthi, a plant pathogen
- Phyllosticta dianthi, a sac fungus
