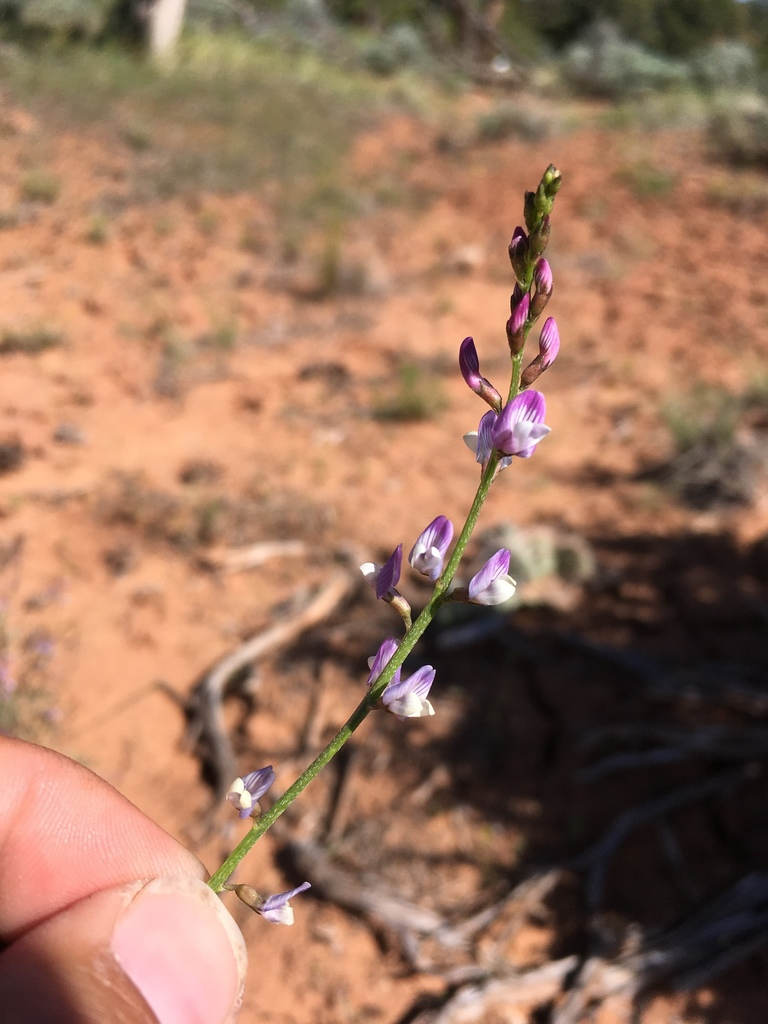

Conservation status
- Secure (NatureServe)

Scientific classification
- Kingdom: Plantae
- Clade: Embryophytes
- Clade: Tracheophytes
- Clade: Spermatophytes
- Clade: Angiosperms
- Clade: Eudicots
- Clade: Rosids
- Order: Fabales
- Family: Fabaceae
- Subfamily: Faboideae
- Genus: Astragalus
- Species: A. wingatanus

Binomial name
- Astragalus wingatanus S.Watson

Synonyms
- Homalobus wingatanus (S.Watson) A.Heller; Astragalus acerbus E.Sheld.; Astragalus dodgeanus M.E.Jones; Astragalus tenellus f. acerbus (E.Sheld.) J.F.Macbr.; Astragalus wingatanus var. dodgeanus (M.E.Jones) M.E.Jones; Homalobus acerbus (E.Sheld.) Rydb.; Homalobus dodgeanus (M.E.Jones) Rydb.

= Astragalus wingatanus =

Species of flowering plant

Astragalus wingatanus, commonly known as the Fort Wingate milkvetch, is a species of flowering plant in the family Fabaceae. It is a perennial herb with white and purple flowers, and black or dark brown seeds.

The species is native to the deserts and dry shrublands of the south-western United States, and was described in 1883. Its conservation status is Secure.

== Taxonomy ==
The species was described by Sereno Watson in 1883.

The type locality is Glenwood Springs, Colorado.

== Distribution ==
Astragalus wingatanus is native to the deserts and dry shrublands of Arizona, Colorado, New Mexico, and Utah, in the western United States. It grows on sandy hills, below cliffs, on open flats, and in oak thickets and pinyon–juniper woodlands. The species is present at elevations of 5,000–7,500 feet (1,500–2,300 m).

== Description ==
Astragalus wingatanus is a perennial herb. It grows 30–35 centimetres (0.98–1.15 ft) high. The stems have white hairs.

The leaves are 2.5–6.5 centimetres (0.98–2.56 in) long, and range in shape from linear-oblanceolate to narrowly elliptic, or sometimes oblong-elliptic. The plant has five to seven leaflets. The lateral leaflets are 4–8 millimetres (0.16–0.31 in) long, and the terminal leaflet is 15–20 millimetres (0.59–0.79 in) long.

The corolla is white, and has a greenish hue. The calyx is a 2.5–3.7 millimetres (0.098–0.146 in) long tube, with black or white hairs. The petals are white and purple.

The seeds are black or dark brown, and pitted or wrinkled. The seeds are oblong to kidney-shaped, around 2.8–3.6 millimetres (0.11–0.14 in) long, and around 1.5 millimetres (0.059 in) wide.

== Ecology ==
The leaves host the mould Peronospora trifoliorum.

== Conservation ==
In 1984, NatureServe classified the species as Secure. It does not have a status in the Endangered Species Act of 1973.
