= Peronospora valerianellae =

Scientific classification
- Domain: Eukaryota
- Clade: Sar
- Clade: Stramenopiles
- Phylum: Oomycota
- Class: Peronosporomycetes
- Order: Peronosporales
- Family: Peronosporaceae
- Genus: Peronospora
- Species: P. valerianellae

Binomial name
- Peronospora valerianellae Fuckel, (1888)

Species of single-celled organism

Peronospora valerianellae is a plant pathogen. It causes downy mildew on leaves of lamb's lettuce Valerianella locusta, which is widely grown as a salad plant in several European countries (for example France and Germany). It is transmitted by seed-borne oospores, and is controlled by fungicide sprays of the foliage.
