= Peronospora viciae =

Scientific classification
- Domain: Eukaryota
- Clade: Sar
- Clade: Stramenopiles
- Phylum: Oomycota
- Class: Peronosporomycetes
- Order: Peronosporales
- Family: Peronosporaceae
- Genus: Peronospora
- Species: P. viciae

Binomial name
- Peronospora viciae (Berk.) Gäum. (1885)

Species of single-celled organism

Peronospora viciae is a plant pathogen. It is a downy mildew that can infect pea plants. In Iceland it grows on wild Vicia cracca and Lathyrus species.
