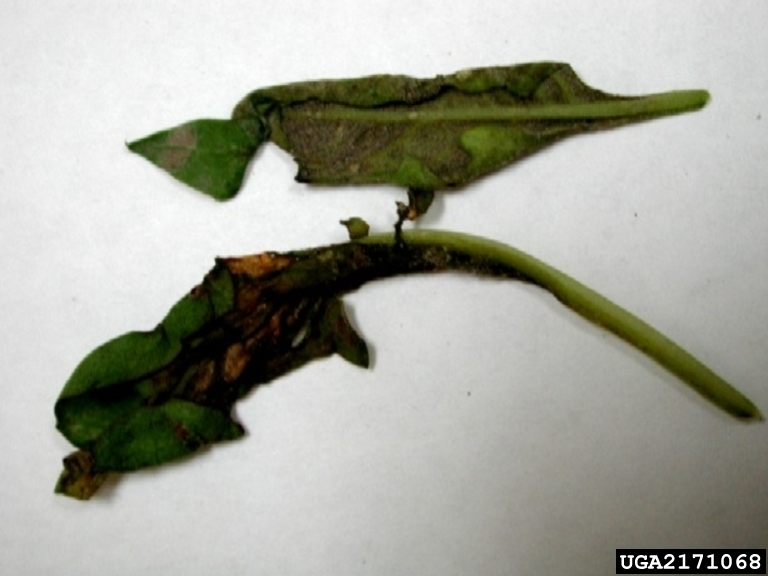
- Leaves infected by Peronospora farinosa f.sp. betae

Scientific classification
- Domain: Eukaryota
- Clade: Sar
- Clade: Stramenopiles
- Phylum: Oomycota
- Class: Peronosporomycetes
- Order: Peronosporales
- Family: Peronosporaceae
- Genus: Peronospora
- Species: P. farinosa
- Forma specialis: P. f. f.sp. betae

Trionomial name
- Peronospora farinosa f.sp. betae Byford, (1967)

Synonyms
- Peronospora betae Kühn; Peronospora schachtii Fuckel, (1870)

= Peronospora farinosa f.sp. betae =

Subspecies of single-celled organism

Peronospora farinosa f.sp. betae is a forma specialis of Peronospora farinosa, attacking sugar beet.
