= Peronospora dianthicola =

Scientific classification
- Domain: Eukaryota
- Clade: Sar
- Clade: Stramenopiles
- Phylum: Oomycota
- Class: Peronosporomycetes
- Order: Peronosporales
- Family: Peronosporaceae
- Genus: Peronospora
- Species: P. dianthicola

Binomial name
- Peronospora dianthicola Barthelet, (1953)

Species of single-celled organism

Peronospora dianthicola is a plant pathogen. It causes downy mildew on leaves of carnation (Dianthus caryophyllus). The disease is of minor importance, whether in commercial production or gardens. If necessary, it can be controlled by foliar sprays of fungicides.
