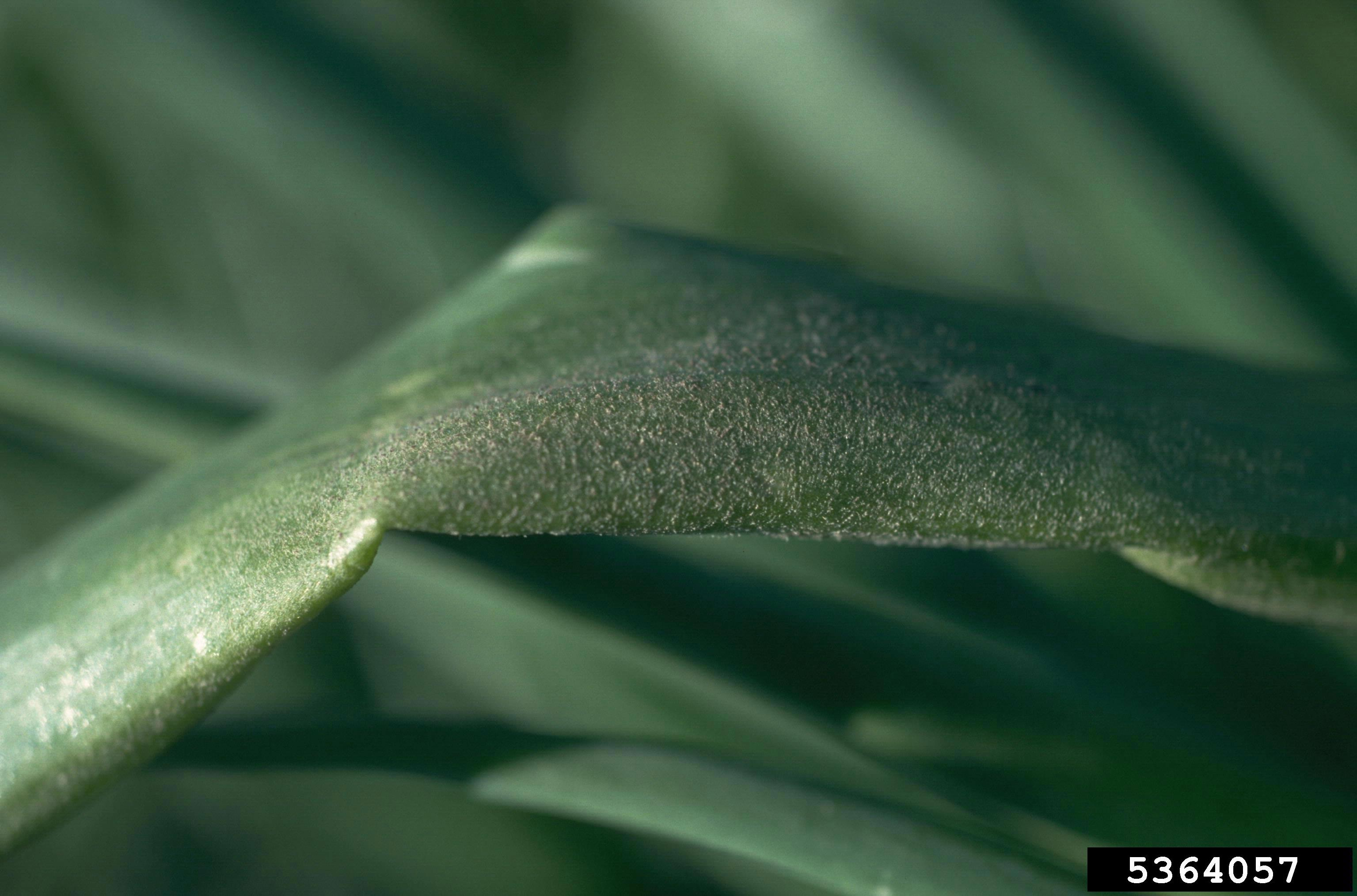
- A close-up shot of downy mildew Peronospora destructor on an onion leaf

Scientific classification
- Domain: Eukaryota
- Supergroup: Stramenopiles
- Division: Oomycota
- Class: Peronosporomycetes
- Order: Peronosporales
- Family: Peronosporaceae
- Genus: Peronospora
- Species: P. destructor

Binomial name
- Peronospora destructor (Berkeley) Caspary, (1849)

= Peronospora destructor =

Species of single-celled organism

Peronospora destructor is a plant pathogen. It causes downy mildew on leaves of cultivated and wild Allium. Allium cepa (onion and shallot) is most often affected, while Allium schoenoprasum (chives) and Allium porrum (leek) are only occasionally affected.

Downy mildew is a major disease of onion. The pathogen persists as mycelium systemically infecting onion bulbs, but is not known to be transmitted in onion seed. The pathogen can persist in the soil for several years as oospores. Systemically infected plants are dwarfed and pale green. Under moist conditions, the pathogen sporulates on the affected tissues and spreads to other plants, on the leaves and stalks of which it forms greyish-violet local lesions. Infected leaves are often entirely killed. Critical periods for infection have been determined. Infected crops yield poorly, and produce distorted bulbs. Control is by crop rotation (at least 3 years between successive onion crops), use of healthy bulbs for planting (heat treatment has been used to eliminate the pathogen from bulbs), fungicide treatment of the bulbs for planting, and fungicide sprays of the foliage if downy mildew infection is nevertheless observed.

== Symptoms ==
Peronospora destructor is an oomycete plant pathogen that affects the Allium genera, including A. cepa (onions), A. sativum (garlic), A. porrum (leeks), A. schoenoprasum (chives), and A. cepa var. aggregatum (shallots). P. destructor causes a wide range of symptoms in onions. From afar, downy mildew of onions can be detected by patches of yellowed plants incapable of growing to the size of surrounding healthy plants.

Leaves: When looking at individual leaves, necrotic spots begin as yellowing spots that eventually turn brown or black as the leaf tissue dies. Older and outer leaves often show symptoms earlier than younger leaves. Leaf tips shrivel as the pathogen moves inward toward the stalk of the plant itself. The symptoms begin as elongated, pale yellow lesions which progress into small patches of fungal colonies that are gray in color. As the disease continues to progress, secondary infection by other pathogens may occur, leading to purple or brown colored spores in the lesions on the leaves, which characterizes the downy mildew disease.

Stalks: The stalks of onion plants can also be infected by Peronospora destructor, with symptoms appearing as yellow or brown necrotic areas along the stalk itself. Although P. destructor does not usually kill the entire onion plant, the pathogen reduces the growth of the onion.

Bulb: The bulb tissue typically becomes soft and watery, lacking the firm quality that typical healthy onions have. The outer portion of the bulb also appears wrinkled and may take on an amber hue.

== Environment ==
Environmental conditions are key to the growth and spread of Peronospora destructor. Spores are generally dispersed during periods of high or low humidity regardless of the temperature at the time. The optimal temperature for P. destructor spore germination is 10 °C, and less sporulation occurs as the temperature increases. Oospores may be produced at up to 27 °C, however, most spores grow when temperatures are cooler. During the summer, oospores induce hyphal growth into the leaf tissue of the onions, in which sporangiophores emerge. The sporangiophores then release sporangia, which are most often spread by wind, in which the pathogen may be capable of traveling several miles before reaching a new host plant. After growing on a host for approximately 9–16 days, the sporangia can sporulate and are available for dispersal to new hosts as part of a secondary disease cycle. As the season ends, Peronospora destructor overwinters in leaf debris as mycelium, and in the soil as oospores. The disease of downy mildew as a whole is most likely to grow on plants that are in cool and damp environments, however, the pathogen has different ways of utilizing environmental factors depending on the condition. For example, if the host plant is in a rainless region, morning dew may create conditions that are suitable for downy mildew to grow. Rainless regions in which Peronospora destructor is found include Saudi Arabia, Iraq, Lebanon, Libya, and Turkey.

== Control ==
Chemical control: One method of control for P. destructor is the use of chemical pesticides. Fungicides such as dithiocarbamates, chlorothalonil, copper, ametoctradin/dimethomorph, and fenamidone may be applied to plants when early symptoms are present. Fungicides should be applied on a more regular basis when the weather is cool and damp (seven-day intervals) compared to when weather is cool and dry (ten-day intervals). By using chemical methods early in the disease cycle, P. destructor is less likely to continue reproducing throughout the plant.

Cultural control: Another method of control is at the field level which includes rotating Allium species with other plants that are not hosts of P. destructor. It is also important to space plants out when planting them and ensure that the soil has adequate drainage to avoid overwatering. Throughout the growing season and after harvest, removing plant debris can be helpful in preventing the spread of P. destructor. Cultivators may also avoid entering the field when it is wet, as well as avoid injuring the plants as they are growing to prevent P. destructor or other pathogens from invading host plants.

Biological control: An additional control mechanism includes selective breeding for plants that are resistant to the pathogen. Qualities of resistant plants include small cells with thick cell walls, flat leaves with pronounced layers, and high cuticular wax content. Cultural control is another method for controlling the spread of P. destructor. This may include avoiding sprinkler irrigation, using bulbs and seeds that are disease free, aligning rows with normal wind patterns, and planting Allium species during times when P. destructor is least likely to infect plants.
