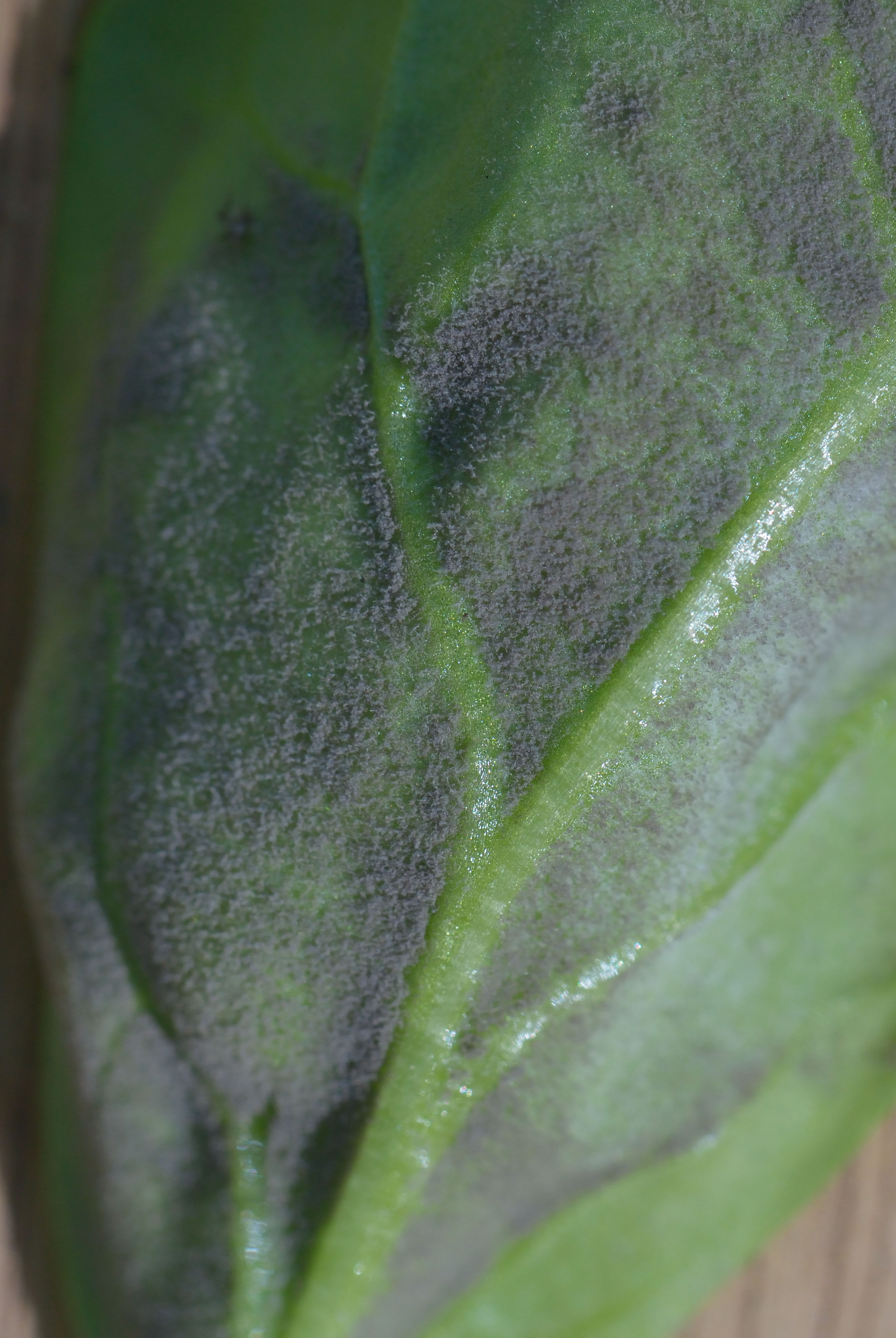
- Pseudoperonospora effusa onSpinacia oleracea 'Breedblad scherpzaad'

Scientific classification
- Domain: Eukaryota
- Clade: Sar
- Clade: Stramenopiles
- Phylum: Oomycota
- Class: Peronosporomycetes
- Order: Peronosporales
- Family: Peronosporaceae
- Genus: Peronospora
- Species: P. effusa

Binomial name
- Peronospora effusa (Grev.) Rabenh. (1854)

Synonyms
- Botrytis effusa Grev. (1824)

= Peronospora farinosa =

Species of single-celled organism

Peronospora farinosa is a species name that has been widely applied to downy mildew on leaves of wild and cultivated Amaranthaceae: Amaranthus, Atriplex, Bassia, Beta, Chenopodium, Halimione, Salsola, Spinacia, etc. However, the species name has been taxonomically rejected (see report 20 from the Nomenclature Committee for fungi) as the original description contained reference to multiple species and could not unequivocally be attributed to a species of Peronospora. In the past, some of the species on important crop plants have been given names as formae speciales, notably f.sp. betae on sugar beet (= P. schachtii) and f.sp. spinaciae on spinach (= P. effusa). However, phylogentic reconstructions have revealed that these "forms" of Peronospora on different genera and their subdivisions, are distinct species, most of which already have previously published scientific names (see Index Fungorum). Such host specialization possibly also exists with respect to the various wild amaranthaceous species given as hosts of P. farinosa.

Downy mildew is a moderately important disease of sugar beet (Beta vulgaris). The pathogen persists as oospores in the soil, or on beet seed crops, or on overwintered volunteer beet plants. Attacks are most important at the seedling stage. The cotyledons are systemically infected, becoming discoloured and distorted. Loss of seedlings causes uneven crop development. Beet leaves are less affected, so a crop can to a substantial effect recover from an attack on seedlings. Control relies on adequate crop rotation and avoidance of sources of infection (e.g. adequate control of the disease on beet seed crops), as oospores survive only 2–3 years in the soil. Individual infected plants may also be removed. It is not generally necessary to apply fungicides.

Downy mildew has more direct importance on spinach (Spinacia oleracea), since it affects the harvested part (leaves). Yellow lesions appear on the older leaves. If rotating crops and removing individual infected plants fails, fungicide treatments are effective, and resistant cultivars are available.
