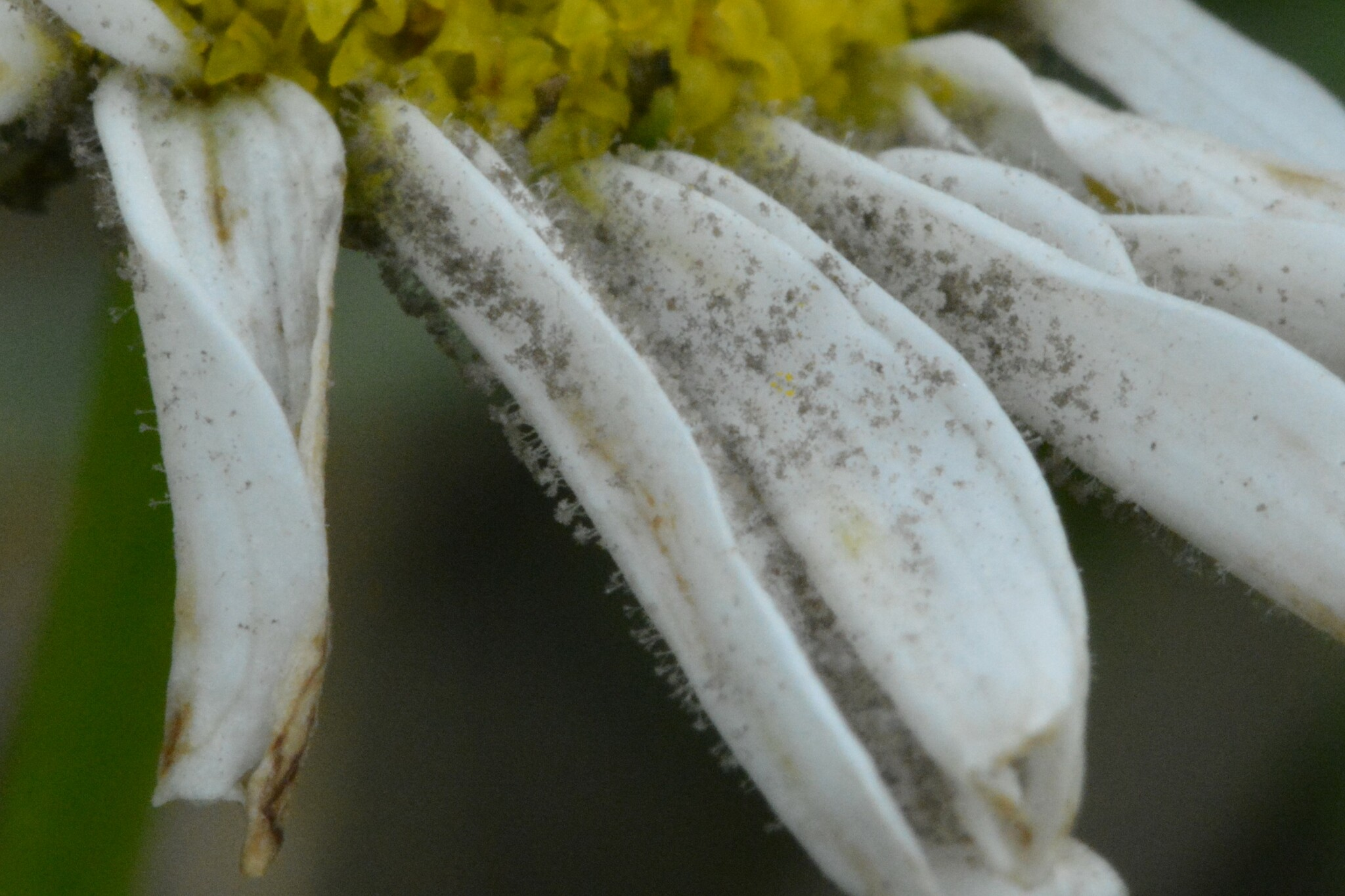
- Grey conidiophores of Peronospora radii on an inflorescence of Tripleurospermum maritimum.

Scientific classification
- Domain: Eukaryota
- Clade: Sar
- Clade: Stramenopiles
- Phylum: Oomycota
- Class: Peronosporomycetes
- Order: Peronosporales
- Family: Peronosporaceae
- Genus: Peronospora
- Species: P. radii

Binomial name
- Peronospora radii de Bary, 1864

Synonyms
- Peronospora danica Gäumann, 1923

= Peronospora radii =

Downy mildew

Peronospora radii is a floricolous downy mildew which infects plants in the Asteraceae. It disfigures the inflorescence, mainly causing symptoms in the ray florets, but can also be visible on the leaves. It forms greyish-violet conidia. It has been reported from hosts in the genera Achillea, Anthemis, Argyranthemum, Chrysanthemum, Coleostephus, Cota, Glebionis, Leucanthemum, Matricaria, and Tripleurospermum.

== Symptoms ==
When Peronospora radii infects chamomile it causes more inflorescences to be produced by the plant, and the inflorescences to be larger and malformed. In some plants it causes more severe malformations like the absence of disc florets, and indeterminate growth resulting in a branched inflorescence.

== Economic impact ==
Since appearing in northern Serbia in 2004, Peronospora radii has become a threat to chamomile cultivation there.
