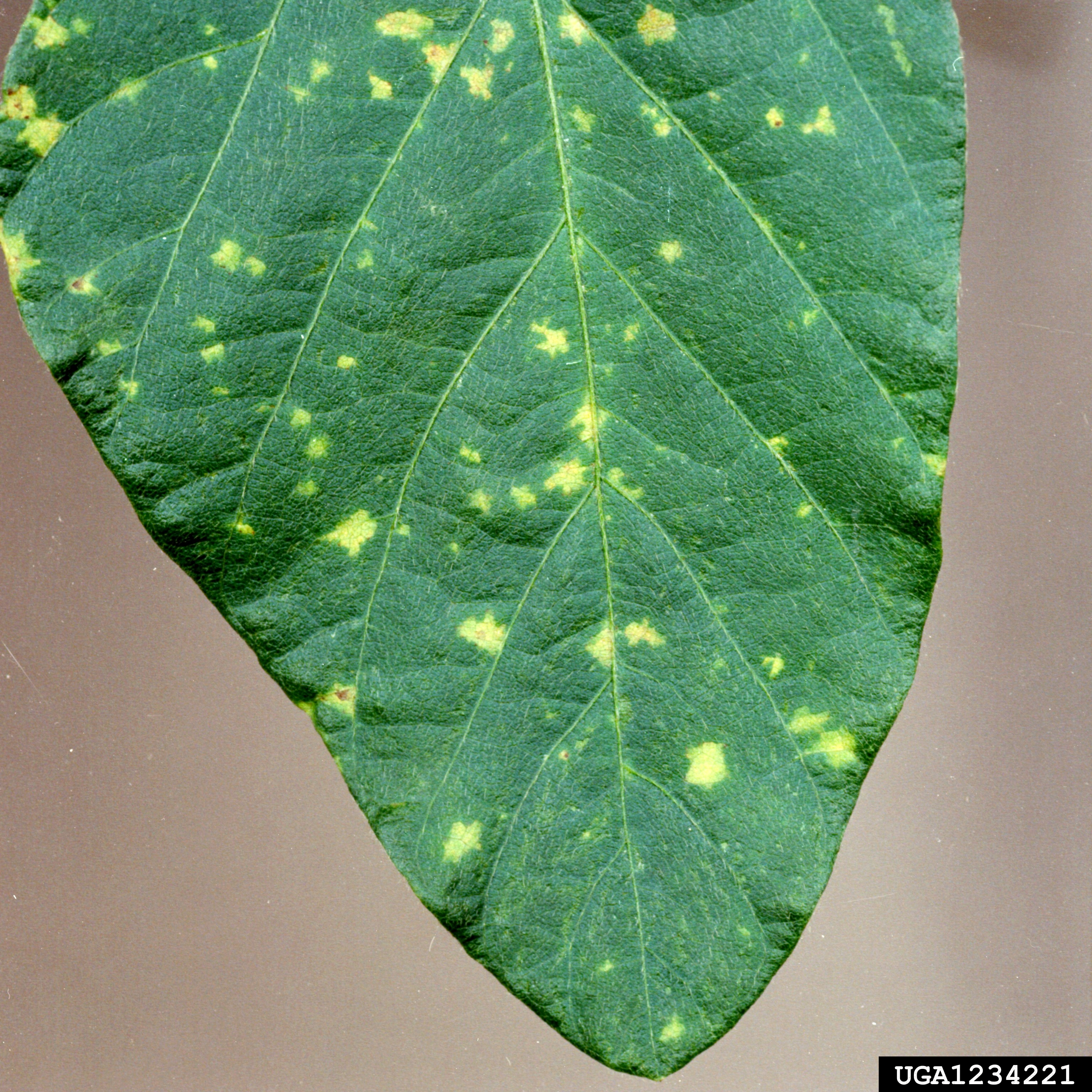
- Peronospora manshurica on soybean leaf

Scientific classification
- Domain: Eukaryota
- Clade: Sar
- Clade: Stramenopiles
- Phylum: Oomycota
- Class: Peronosporomycetes
- Order: Peronosporales
- Family: Peronosporaceae
- Genus: Peronospora
- Species: P. manshurica

Binomial name
- Peronospora manshurica (Naumov) Syd., (1923)

Synonyms
- Peronospora sojae F. Lehm. & F.A. Wolf, (1924); Peronospora trifoliorum var. manshurica Naumov, (1914)

= Peronospora manshurica =

Species of single-celled organism

Peronospora manshurica is a plant pathogen. It is a widespread disease on the leaves of soybeans and other crop plants. The fungi is commonly referred to as downy mildew, "leafspot", or "leaf-spot".

== Symptoms ==
The most visible symptoms of P. manshurica are pale green to light yellow spots that enlarge into pale to bright yellow lesions of variable size and shape. Lesions later turn grayish-brown to dark-brown with a yellowish-green margin that may eventually become entirely brown. Tufts of grayish to pale-colored sporangiophores on the underside of leaves easily distinguish the infection from other foliar diseases.

== Disease cycle ==
Peronospora manshurica commonly begins its disease cycle in the spring, with overwintering oospores mainly serving as the primary inoculum. This primarily occurs by the use of oospore encrusted seeds for planting. Oospores, and sometimes even mycelium, surviving on plant material can also serve as the primary inoculum. After the first infection by the oospores, the secondary dispersal of infection is accomplished by conidia originating from conidiophores. Secondary lesions appear after about 10 days, allowing the fungus to sporulate once more. This cycle can occur many times during one season, making Peronospora manshurica’s disease cycle is polycyclic. About 20 days after inoculation, oospores are formed within infected plant tissues. Like other oomycetes, this is accomplished by the fertilization of oogonia by antheridia. This oospore will function as a survival structure for the pathogen over the winter, and serve as the primary inoculum the following spring.

== Pathogenesis ==
Peronospora manshurica is biotrophic, meaning that a living host (most commonly the soybean) is required in order for the fungus to survive. In order to initiate infection of its host, the pathogenic conidial spores are dispersed by wind, rain-splash, and run-off. The conidia then land on new leaves and invade through stomata or more directly by a germ tube The germ tube will form an appresorium and penetration peg to pierce the epidermis of the leaf, allowing the pathogen to incite infection. Generally, older leaves are resistant to infection, while younger leaves are more susceptible.

Peronospora manshurica can cause systemic infection. This predominantly occurs when seeds and surrounding soil contain oospores, causing seedling hypocotyls to be infected upon germination. Systemic infection can also occur during a dense secondary dispersal of inoculum, when newly formed leaves are infected right after their formation.

== Risk factors ==
The fungus spreads by oospores on diseased leaves and/or on infected seed. The disease spreads in environments with high humidity and favors temperatures between 20-22 °C.

== Importance ==
Downy mildews are common and widespread pathogens, existing worldwide. P. manshurica exists anywhere soybeans are cultivated. Historically, this pathogen has been rather low risk, because infected crops do not typically exhibit significant yield loss. A 2016 study showed that infected plants did not exhibit decreased numbers of soybean pods or grains per pod, however seed weight decreased linearly with increasing downy mildew severity. It has also been shown to cause 9-18% yield losses during epidemics. Despite this, yields are still not impacted significantly enough by P. manshurica to warrant fungicide treatment in the United States. If a control measure is used, it is likely that seed quality is of particular concern, in which case cultural measures or resistance will be implemented.

Thirty three races of P. manshurica have been recorded. This pathogen is closely associated with its host, and therefore is able to quickly change its gene expression in response to its host. Because of this, P. manshurica is carefully monitored, despite its lesser ability of inflicting serious damage. With the pathogens extensive prevalence, the emergence of a particularly destructive race could be detrimental to a susceptible host population under favorable conditions.

== Control ==
The disease is often controlled using fungicides such as mancozeb, maneb, or zineb.
