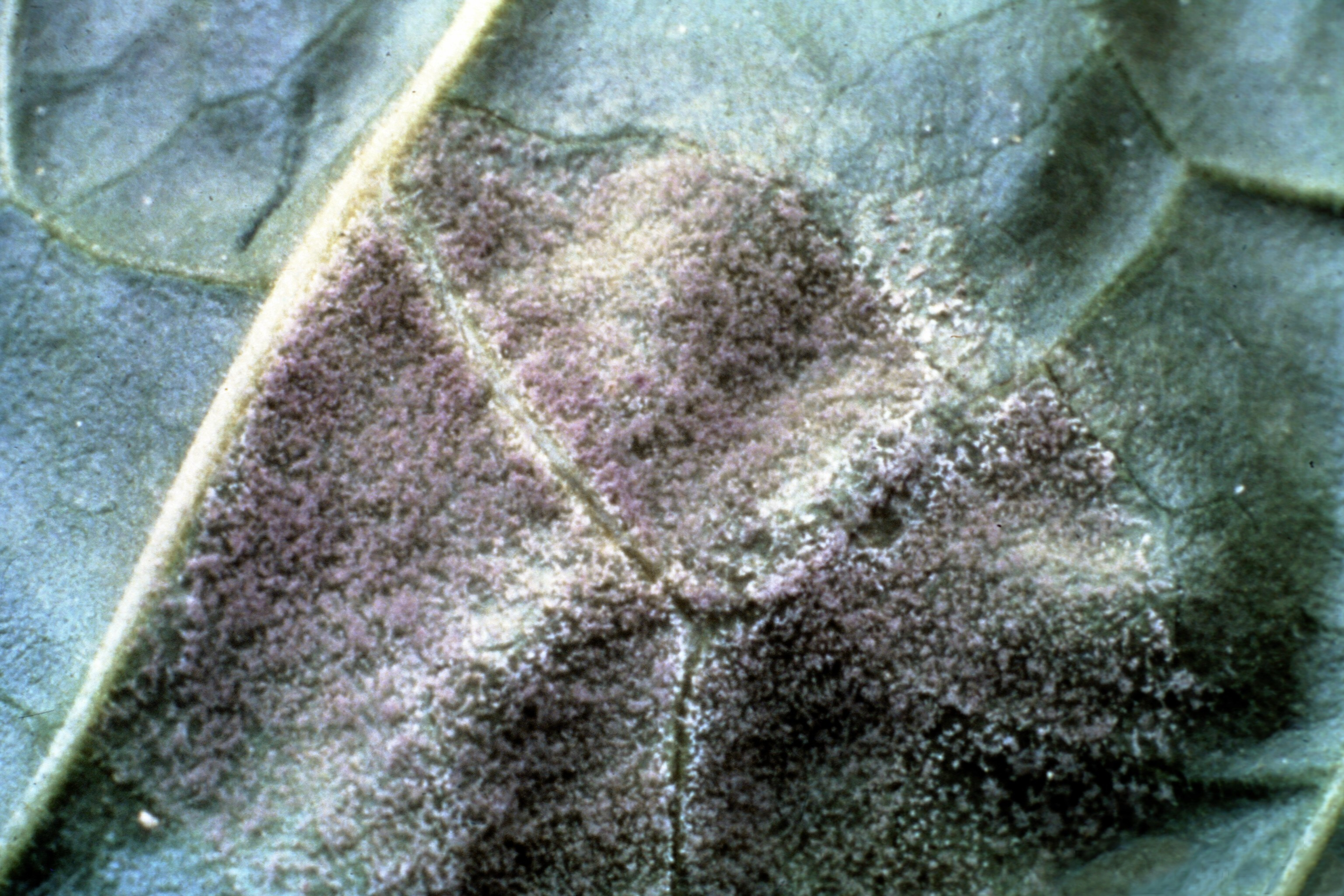

Scientific classification
- Domain: Eukaryota
- Clade: Sar
- Clade: Stramenopiles
- Phylum: Oomycota
- Class: Peronosporomycetes
- Order: Peronosporales
- Family: Peronosporaceae
- Genus: Peronospora
- Species: P. hyoscyami
- Forma specialis: P. h. f.sp. tabacina

Trionomial name
- Peronospora hyoscyami f.sp. tabacina Skalický, (1964)

Synonyms
- Peronospora effusa var. hyoscyami Rabenh.; Peronospora hyoscyami de Bary, (1863); Peronospora hyoscyami sensu Thümen, (1863); Peronospora nicotianae Speg., (1891); Peronospora tabacina D.B. Adam, (1933)

= Peronospora hyoscyami f.sp. tabacina =

Subspecies of single-celled organism

Peronospora hyoscyami f.sp. tabacina is a plant pathogen infecting tobacco that causes blue mold. It is an oomycete (a fungus-like organism) that is highly destructive toward seed plants. It is very prevalent in humid farming zones, like the southeastern and Eastern U.S., Canada, and countries bordering the Caribbean. The disease was first identified in 1921 in Florida and Georgia. Ten years later the same disease was found once again in the same region of the U.S. The disease began to spread into Virginia, Maryland, and North Carolina. A few years later, the disease reached Kentucky and Tennessee. In 1960, a blue mold epidemic spread in approximately eleven countries. There was approximately twenty five million dollars in losses which is nearly thirty percent of tobacco plants at the time. Each year, Peronospora hyoscyami is introduced as blue mold as windblown spores from outside the region by infected transplants.

== Symptoms ==
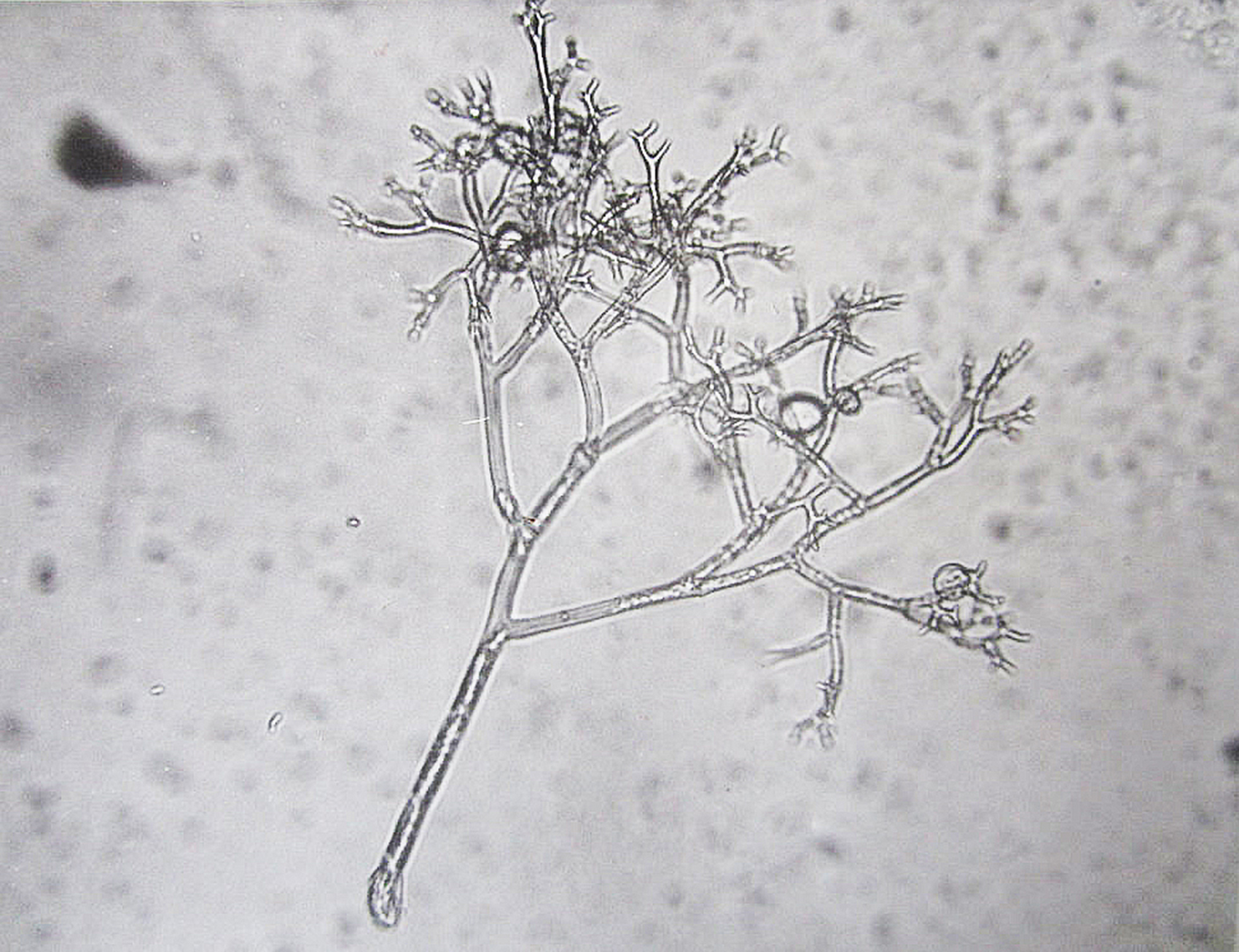
Conidophores of P. hyoscyami f.sp. tabacina. Conidiophores with this pathogen are dichotomous branched, eventually end with two teeth or sterigmata and on each sterigma is formed one conidia.

Tobacco plants with an upright position of small patches of the seed bed are typically early signs of blue mold. These leaves are usually 2–4 centimetres (0.79–1.57 in) in diameter, and normally spotted with yellow, gray, or a bluish mold in the lower surface. Younger plants that are up to four weeks old and are affected by the disease are easily killed by the oomycete. Older plants become deformed and dark, indicating that parts of the plant are dead. In more severe cases the stem and root become infected and turn to a brownish color. The observation of downy mold in the lower surface of the leaf is the most reliable symptom of blue mold. Downy mold carries thousands of small reproductive units called conidia If conidia forms at different spots in the seedbed an outbreak is more than likely to occur. The symptoms usually take place before it's obvious. The symptoms evolve rapidly and are typically noticeable over night.

The oomycete frequently takes place when the vein of the leaves reaches vascular tissue of the stem, causing weakness and lodging. This infection is called "systemic infection". The infection causes a stunt in growth and the leaves become narrow and short. The vascular system of the plants usually turns brown in color and the weakened stalk usually causing the stalk to fall over.

The mould is highly weather sensitive. During the time when the weather is cool, wet, or overcast the disease can evolve in a greenhouse or field. The disease spreads rapidly because of the pathogen. The rate of continental spread is based on the potential for high levels of inoculum and effective wind spores. When the weather is clear, dry, and hot the disease usually stops spreading and more than likely stops all together.

== Spreading the disease ==
A major way blue mold spreads is by the distribution of infected transplants. Even though they may appear to be healthy, they can still harbor the infection. Farmers generally buy transplants from other growers, and take risks of possibly buying diseased plants. If these plants are diseased they are risking their other plants' getting blue mold.

A plant may remain symptom-free for five to seven days, before the first appearance of disease. When weather conditions are reasonable, a second set of spores evolves in seven to ten days. If these plants are not chemically treated, the cycle may be repeated several times during the growing season. This can cause a huge epidemic causing many plants to be infected. Blue mold has been found to appear three times each week from March to August.

== Host-pathogen interaction ==
After the germination of conidia, the initial penetration of the host depends on the formation of appressoria near the stomata. This is largely due to a response of P. hyoscyami f.sp. tabacina to topographical cues of the host such as stomatal openings. Upon entry of an infection peg through a stomatal opening, hyphae grow and develop between plant cells. When hyphae reach a photosynthetic mesophyll cell a peg penetrates the cell and establishes a haustorium which the oomycete uses to absorb the necessary nutrients for its own growth. Through the establishment of haustoria the pathogen develops an intimate relationship with the host. In doing so P. hyoscyami f.sp. tabacina efficiently redirects the nutrients of the host and delivers effector proteins into the host cytoplasm that suppress the host defense response.

=== Tobacco defense to P. hyoscyami f.sp. tabacina ===
The activation of systemic acquired resistance (SAR) has shown to be an effective management strategy for P. hyoscyami f.sp. tabacina. It has been documented that an accumulation of pathogenesis-related proteins (PR proteins) and increased activities of peroxidase, β-1, 3-glucanase, and chitinases have been shown to be associated with induced resistance in tobacco to P. hyoscyami f.sp. tabacina. In addition, PR proteins have been shown to have antifungal activities in vitro and thus are thought to be a key component in the resistance of tobacco to blue mold. Of the tobacco defense responses to P. hyoscyami f.sp. tabacina SAR has been characterized as the best activated response to blue mold.

In addition to SAR, tobacco plants have been found to secrete β–ionone and T-phylloplanin which both inhibit the sporulation and growth of P. hyoscyami f.sp. tabacina. T-phylloplanin proteins are secreted by tall glandular trichomes on the aerial surface of tobacco leaves and may be a novel leaf surface defense molecule in tobacco.

== Prevention ==
The disease is getting harder to manage and is becoming a problem. The way to prevent the disease is to manage crops and protect plants with fungicides when they are most vulnerable while taking control of the crops early on. Making the environment less favorable for the pathogen to survive and protect the tobacco will prevent its growth and spread and it is imperative to always keep the pathogen out of tobacco and the area for as long as possible. Farmers are also always able to grow their own plants rather than purchase them from others which should reduce the chance of planting diseased plants.
