= Peronospora antirrhini =

Scientific classification
- Domain: Eukaryota
- Clade: Sar
- Clade: Stramenopiles
- Phylum: Oomycota
- Class: Peronosporomycetes
- Order: Peronosporales
- Family: Peronosporaceae
- Genus: Peronospora
- Species: P. antirrhini

Binomial name
- Peronospora antirrhini J.Schröt. (1874)

Species of single-celled organism

Peronospora antirrhini is a plant pathogen. It causes downy mildew on leaves of species of Antirrhinum and related genera (e.g. Misopates).

The disease is generally of minor importance, but can be damaging on antirrhinum seedlings in the glasshouse, which may be systemically infected.
