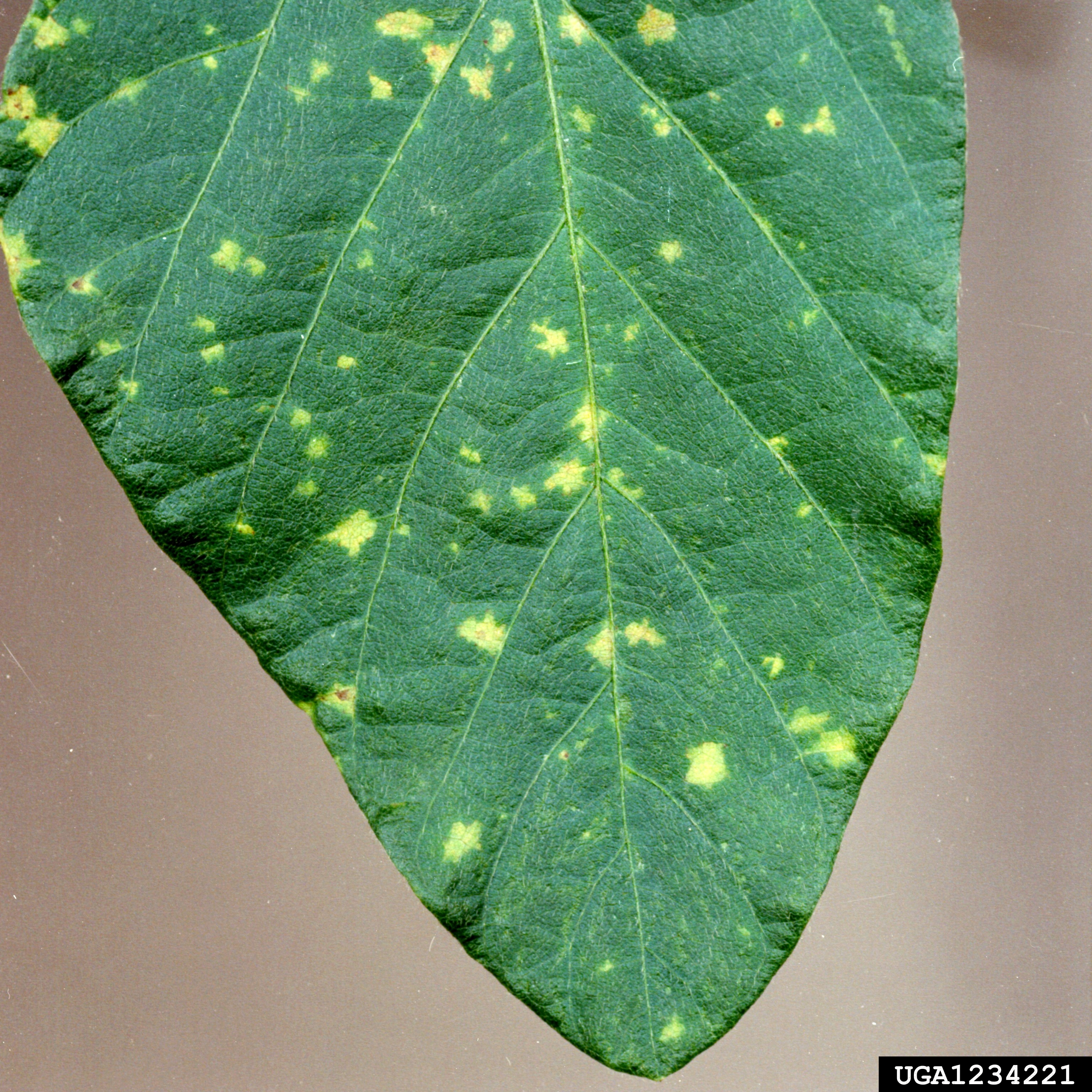
- P. manshurica on soybean leaf

Scientific classification
- Domain: Eukaryota
- Clade: Sar
- Clade: Stramenopiles
- Phylum: Oomycota
- Class: Peronosporomycetes
- Order: Peronosporales
- Family: Peronosporaceae
- Genus: Peronospora; Corda

= Peronospora =

Genus of plant pathogens

Peronospora is a genus of downy mildews that are obligate plant pathogens. They can cause severe damage to many different cultivated crops, as well as wild and ornamental plants. Peronospora is most closely related to Pseudoperonospora, and together they form the clade of downy mildews with coloured conidia. Peronospora has far more species than any other genus of the downy mildews. However, many species have been moved from this genus to other genera based on phylogenetic evidence. Among these are the species now in Hyaloperonospora, important pathogens of the Brassicaceae. Now, the Peronospora species of most importance is likely Peronospora tabacina. Peronospora tabacina causes blue mold on tobacco plants and can severely reduce yields of this economically important crop to the point where it has been classified as a bioweapon.

== History ==
Peronospora was first described in 1837 by August Carl Joseph Corda, a Czech mycologist and physician, in his first of six volumes of his Icones fungorum hucusque cognitorum. Since then, many of the species originally placed in Peronospora have been allocated to other genera or given rise to new genera based on new techniques such as molecular genetics.

There was an epidemic in 1960 of Peronospora tabacina affecting tobacco plants leading to $25 million in losses across eleven countries, which was about 30 percent of the tobacco plants. Another epidemic that was caused by Peronospora destructor reduced the yield of sweet onions by 25 percent in Georgia, USA in 2012, and led to an estimated $18.2 million in losses.

== Habitat and ecology ==
Most of the Peronospora species are highly specific to their hosts and can generally be found anywhere the host plant grows, or is being cultivated. A large portion of their life cycle is spent inside their host plant. Many species of Peronospora are seedborne pathogens, so the worldwide spread of Peronospora crop-plant pathogens is likely to be a result of unknowingly trading infected seeds to new areas. There are also many Peronospora species that are spread by wind currents, which allows them to disperse over large distances. Peronospora species prefer humid air and cool temperatures.

One clade in the genus is known as the floricolous downy mildews. These species produce conidiophores exclusively on the flowers of their hosts.

== General form and structure ==
The first stage in the Peronospora life history is the sporangia. The sporangia are small spore-like structures about 65 um long that germinate a germ-tube when they are near a leaf stoma. A germ tube will come from the sporangium and penetrate the leaf cell where it will form a haustorium. The haustorium absorbs nutrients from the leaf, while hyphae invade the intercellular space, and the leaf will eventually develop a lesion. These lesions often start out yellow and then turn brown as the leaf starts to undergo necrosis. From here, Peronospora can undergo either asexual reproduction or sexual reproduction. Asexual reproduction occurs when the air outside is moist making for favourable conditions. During asexual reproduction, hyphae on the host plant will form sporangiophores, which will produce conidia. The conidia will be dispersed by the wind is able to infect other plants. The asexual cycle only takes five to seven days to complete. Sexual reproduction occurs when the conditions are unfavourable and it needs to withstand harsh environmental conditions. During sexual reproduction, the hyphae will undergo meiosis forming antheridia and oogonia, the only haploid structures in the Peronospora life history. The antheridia will fuse to the oogonia, initiating plasmogamy and then karyogamy, and will result in the production of many oospores. The oospores can then be dispersed by the wind to infect more plants.

Both Peronospora and Pseudoperonospora are characterized by their ability to produce melanized sporangia, but Pseudoperonospora produces zoospores whereas Peronospora cannot.

== Practical importance ==
The model oomycete pathogen, Peronospora parasitica, used to be included in this genus, however it has been reclassified to the genus Hyaloperonospora.

Some species of Peronospora have been considered for their use as a bioweapon or have been classified as potential bioweapons. Peronspora somniferi was considered for its ability to devastate fields of the opium poppy, which could have targeted areas that depend on the crop. The United States has classified Peronospora tabacina as a possible bioweapon, because if it were used to target the US tobacco industry, it would lead to major economic loss.

== Genomics and genetics ==
Only one species in the genus Peronospora has had its genome sequenced and assembled. In 2015, Derevnina et al. performed a de novo sequence assembly of the genome of two Peronospora tabacina isolates using Illumina sequencing. They estimated the genome size to be 68 Mb with a mitochondrial genome of 43 kb. The two assemblies had 61.8x and 128.9x coverage for the nuclear genomes and 6,824x and 43,225x coverage for the mitochondrial genomes. The mitochondrial genome only differed by seven single nucleotide polymorphisms, three small indels, and one copy number variant. Using a program to predict gene models, they found 18,000 potential protein coding genes.

== List of species ==
The following species are placed in genus Peronospora:

- Peronospora aconiti
- Peronospora aestivalis
- Peronospora affinis
- Peronospora agrestis
- Peronospora agrimoniae
- Peronospora alchemillae
- Peronospora alpicola
- Peronospora alsinearum
- Peronospora alta Fuckel
- Peronospora akatsukae Ito & Murayama
- Peronospora anagallidis
- Peronospora antirrhini
- Peronospora aparines
- Peronospora apula
- Peronospora aquatica
- Peronospora arborescens
- Peronospora arenariae
- Peronospora argemones
- Peronospora arthurii
- Peronospora arvensis
- Peronospora asperuginis
- Peronospora astragalina
- Peronospora atriplicis-hastatae
- Peronospora belbahrii
- Peronospora boni-henrici
- Peronospora bulbocapni
- Peronospora calotheca
- Peronospora campestris
- Peronospora canescens Benua
- Peronospora cerastii-anomali
- Peronospora cerastii-brachypetali
- Peronospora chenopodii-polyspermi
- Peronospora chlorae
- Peronospora chrysosplenii
- Peronospora claytoniae
- Peronospora conglomerata
- Peronospora consolidae
- Peronospora coronillae
- Peronospora corydalis
- Peronospora corydalis-intermediae
- Peronospora cristata
- Peronospora cyparissiae
- Peronospora debaryi
- Peronospora destructor
- Peronospora dianthi
- Peronospora dianthicola
- Peronospora dicentrae
- Peronospora digitalis
- Peronospora dipsaci
- Peronospora echii
- Peronospora effusa
- Peronospora elsholtziae
- Peronospora erodii
- Peronospora ervi
- Peronospora esulae
- Peronospora farinosa
  - Peronospora farinosa f. sp. betae
  - Peronospora farinosa f. sp. chenopodii
  - Peronospora farinosa f. sp. spinaciae
- Peronospora ficariae
- Peronospora flava
- Peronospora fulva
- Peronospora galii
- Peronospora glechomae
- Peronospora grisea
- Peronospora hiemalis
- Peronospora holostei
- Peronospora honckenyae
- Peronospora illyrica
- Peronospora jagei
- Peronospora knautiae
- Peronospora kochiae-scopariae
- Peronospora lamii
- Peronospora lapponica
- Peronospora lathyri-verni
- Peronospora lathyrina
- Peronospora lepigoni
- Peronospora linariae
- Peronospora linariae-genistifoliae
- Peronospora lithospermi
- Peronospora litoralis
- Peronospora lotorum
- Peronospora manshurica
- Peronospora mayorii
- Peronospora meconopsidis
- Peronospora medicaginis-minimae
- Peronospora medicaginis-orbicularis
- Peronospora melandryi-noctiflori
- Peronospora meliloti
- Peronospora mesembryanthemi
- Peronospora minor
- Peronospora myosotidis
- Peronospora narbonensis
- Peronospora oblatispora
- Peronospora obovata
- Peronospora ornithopi
- Peronospora orobi
- Peronospora parva
- Peronospora paula
- Peronospora perillae
- Peronospora phacae
- Peronospora plantaginis
- Peronospora polycarpi
- Peronospora polygoni
- Peronospora polygoni-convolvuli
- Peronospora potentillae
- Peronospora potentillae-anserinae
- Peronospora potentillae-reptantis
- Peronospora potentillae-sterilis
- Peronospora pseudostellaria
- Peronospora pulveracea
- Peronospora radii
- Peronospora ranunculi
- Peronospora aff. ranunculi
- Peronospora romanica
- Peronospora rubi
- Peronospora rumicis
- Peronospora salviae-plebeiae
- Peronospora sanguisorbae
- Peronospora saturejae-hortensis
- Peronospora saxifragae
- Peronospora schachtii
- Peronospora scleranthi
- Peronospora scutellariae
- Peronospora sepium
- Peronospora sherardiae
- Peronospora silvatica
- Peronospora silvestris
- Peronospora somniferi
- Peronospora sordida
- Peronospora sparsa
- Peronospora stachydis
- Peronospora statices
- Peronospora stellariae-aquaticae
- Peronospora stellariae-uliginosae
- Peronospora stigmaticola
- Peronospora swinglei
- Peronospora symphyti
- Peronospora tabacina
- Peronospora tetragonolobi
- Peronospora teucrii
- Peronospora tomentosa
- Peronospora tranzscheliana
- Peronospora trifolii-alpestris
- Peronospora trifolii-arvensis
- Peronospora trifolii-hybridi
- Peronospora trifolii-minoris
- Peronospora trifolii-repentis
- Peronospora trifoliorum
  - Peronospora trifoliorum f. trifolii-pratensis
- Peronospora trigonellae
- Peronospora trigonotidis
- Peronospora trivialis
- Peronospora valerianae
- Peronospora valerianellae
- Peronospora variabilis
- Peronospora verbasci
- Peronospora verbenae
- Peronospora verna
- Peronospora vernalis
- Peronospora viciae
  - Peronospora viciae f. sp. pisi
- Peronospora violacea
- Peronospora violae
