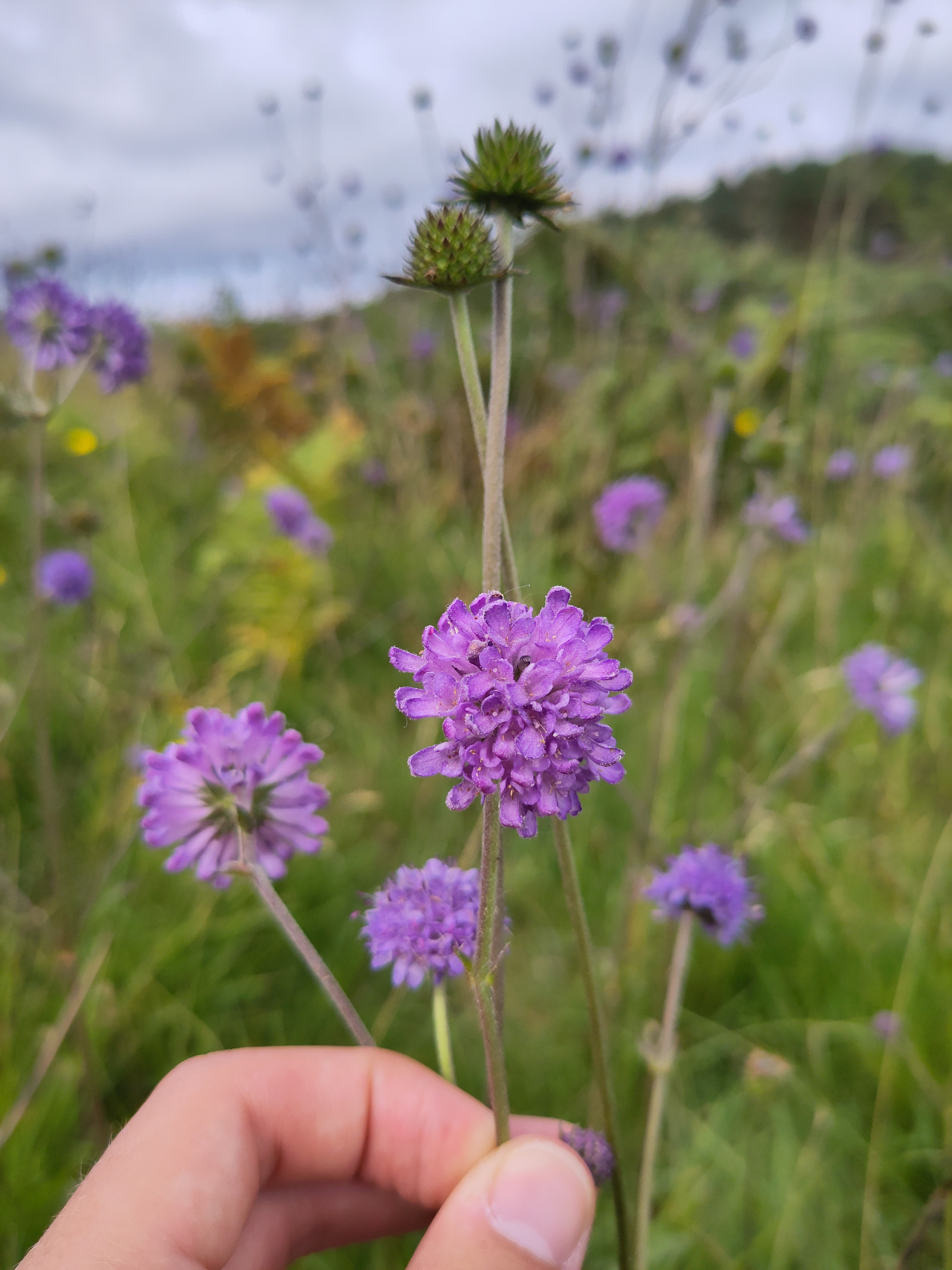
- A flowerhead of Succisa pratensis infected by Peronospora violacea.

Scientific classification
- Domain: Eukaryota
- Clade: Sar
- Clade: Stramenopiles
- Phylum: Oomycota
- Class: Peronosporomycetes
- Order: Peronosporales
- Family: Peronosporaceae
- Genus: Peronospora
- Species: P. violacea

Binomial name
- Peronospora violacea Berkeley, 1860

= Peronospora violacea =

Downy mildew

Peronospora violacea is a floricolous downy mildew which infects plants in the Caprifoliaceae. It has been reported from hosts in the genera Dipsacus, Knautia, Lomelosia, Scabiosa, and Succisa.

It produces conidiophores on the petals and styles of the host, oospores inside the petal and style tissue, and suppresses the development of the anthers. Infection is systemic, with hyphae produced in the xylem of the host rhizomes and stems.

In infected plants of Succisa pratensis the flowers have longer, pinker petals on which the conidophores are produced. However, other authors report that on the same host it causes the host corollas to be brownish and dead-looking.

== Gallery ==
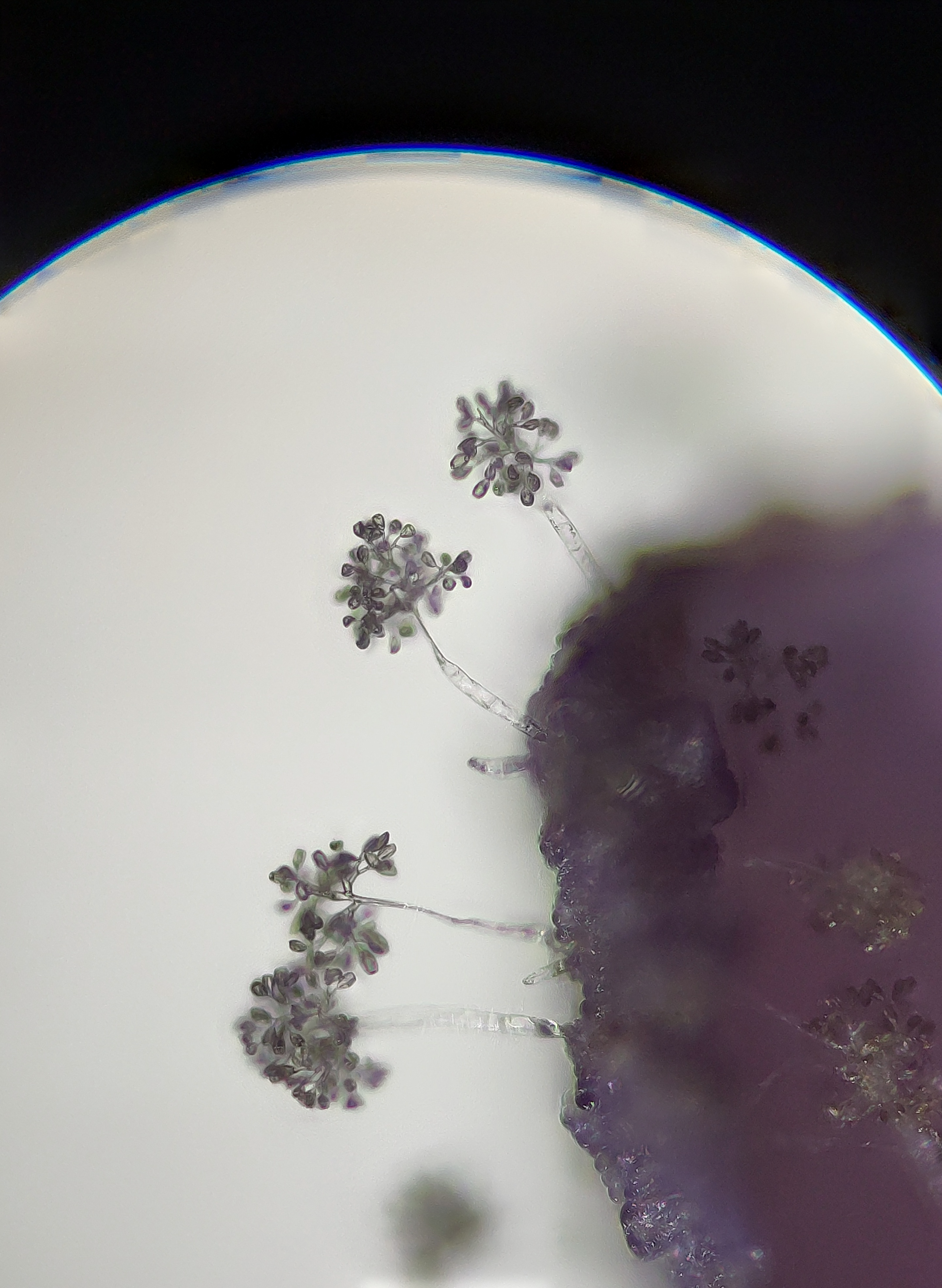
Conidiophores of Peronospora violacea on a petal of Succisa pratensis, viewed under the microscope (focus stacked image).

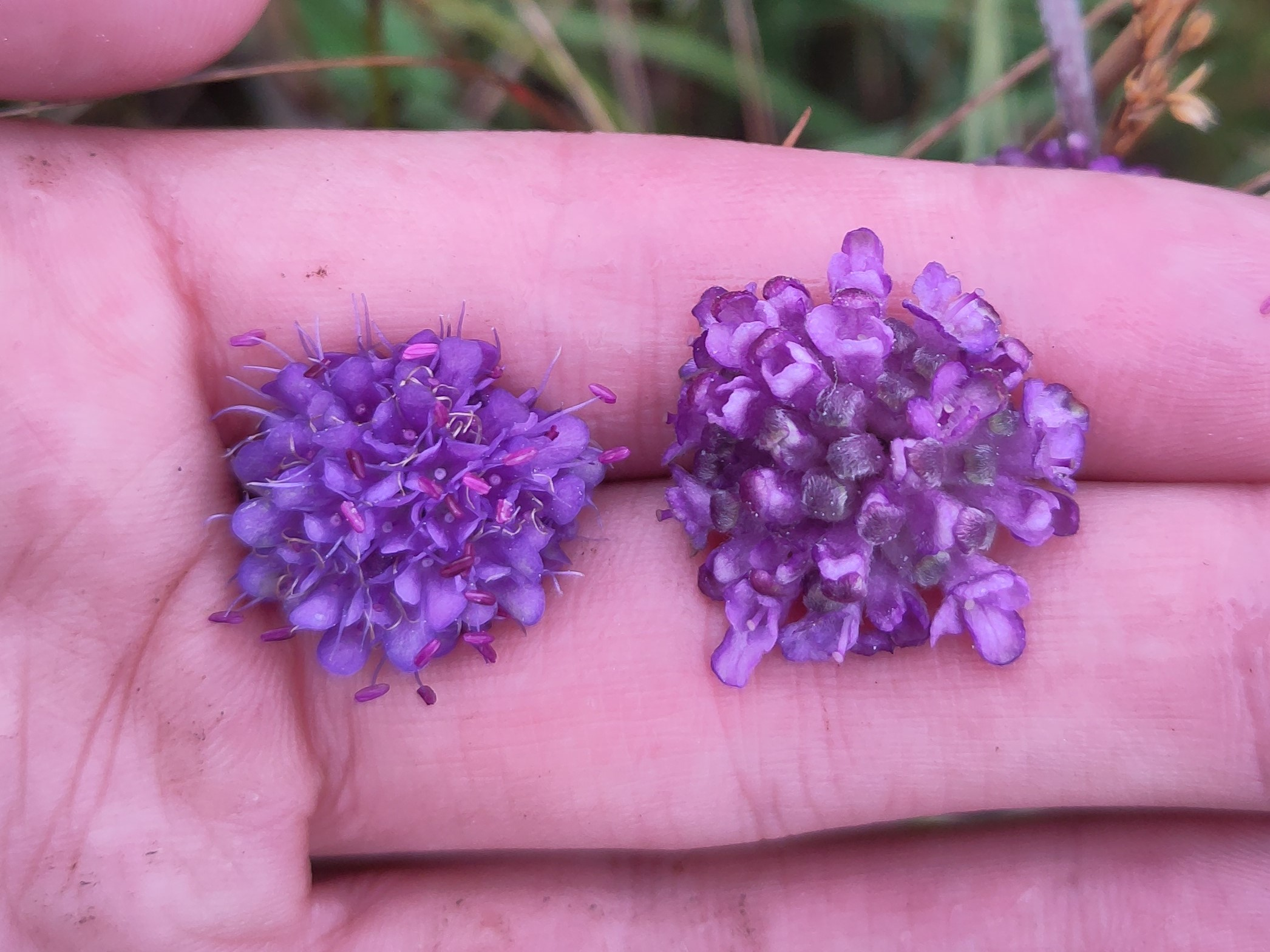
Flowerheads of Succisa pratensis, infected (right) and uninfected (left) with Peronospora violacea.

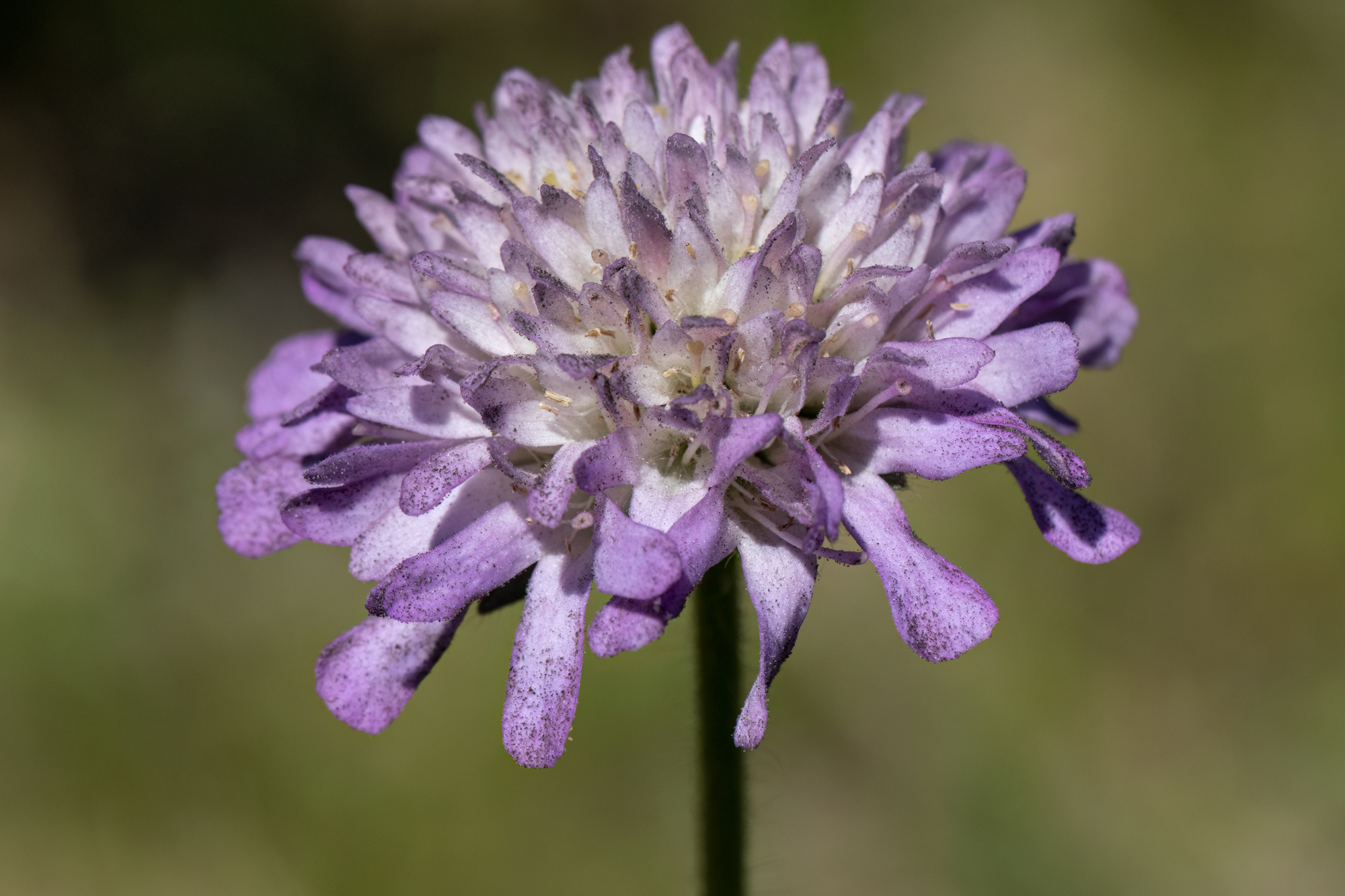
A flowerhead of Knautia arvensis infected with Peronospora violacea.

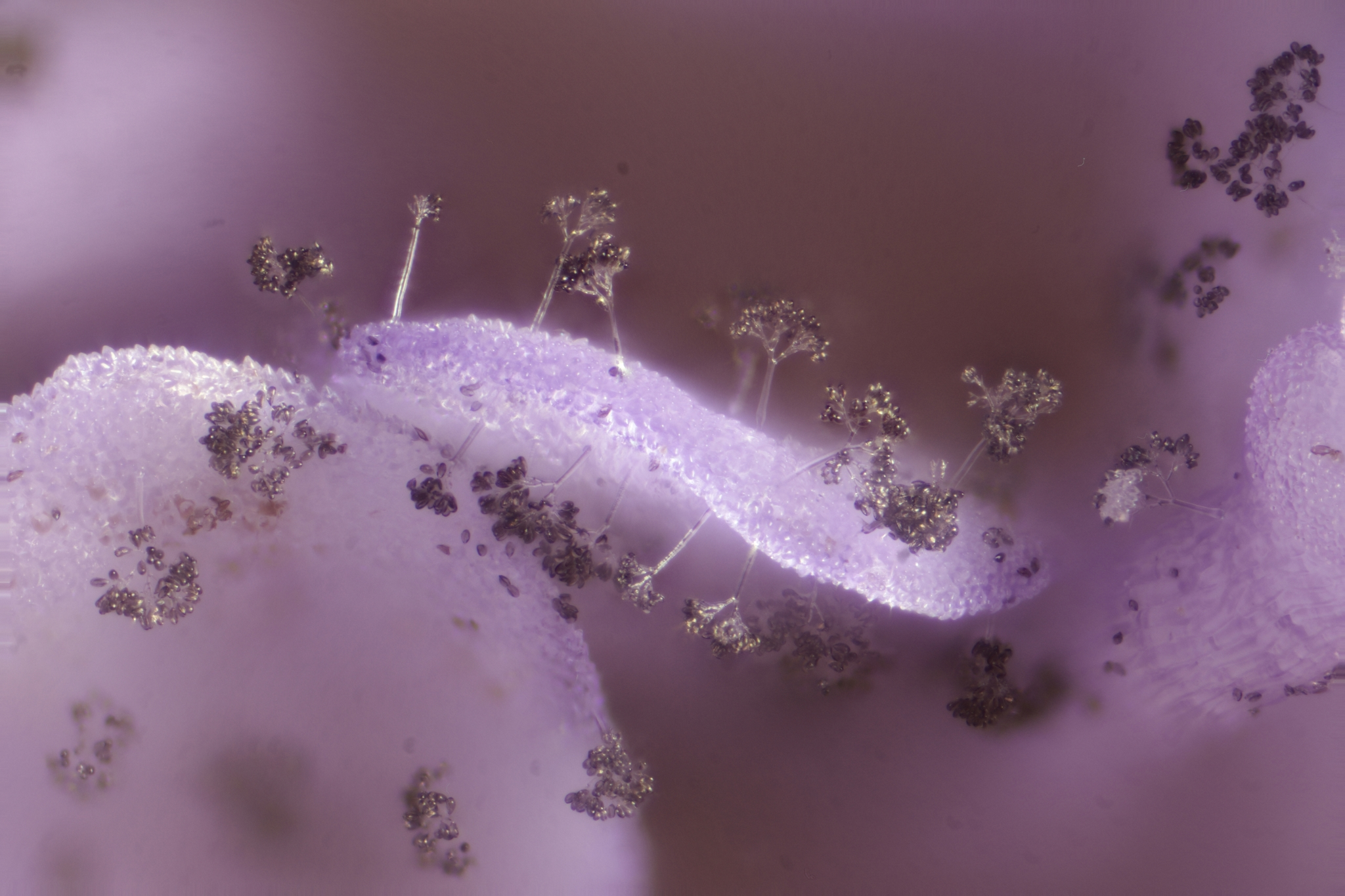
Conidiophores of Peronospora violacea on a petal of Knautia arvensis.
