= Oxathiapiprolin =

Names
- Preferred IUPAC name 1^{2},1^{6}-Difluoro-7^{5}-methyl-7^{3}-(trifluoromethyl)-2^{4},2^{5}-dihydro-4(4,1)-piperidina-2(5,3)-[1,2]oxazola-3(4,2)-[1,3]thiazola-7(1)-pyrazola-1(1)-benzenaheptaphan-5-one

Identifiers
CAS Number	1003318-67-9
3D model (JSmol)	Interactive image
Beilstein Reference	20731698
ChEBI	CHEBI:83271
ChemSpider	32697748
ECHA InfoCard	100.227.885
EC Number	801-263-1
PubChem CID	56945145
UNII	56498AIV8R
- InChI: InChI=1S/C24H22F5N5O2S/c1-13-9-20(24(27,28)29)31-34(13)11-21(35)33-7-5-14(6-8-33)23-30-18(12-37-23)17-10-19(36-32-17)22-15(25)3-2-4-16(22)26/h2-4,9,12,14,19H,5-8,10-11H2,1H3 Key: IAQLCKZJGNTRDO-UHFFFAOYSA-N
- SMILES: CC1=CC(=NN1CC(=O)N2CCC(CC2)C3=NC(=CS3)C4=NOC(C4)C5=C(C=CC=C5F)F)C(F)(F)F

Properties
Chemical formula	C_{24}H_{22}F_{5}N_{5}O_{2}S
Molar mass	539.53 g·mol^{−1}
Density	1.4645 g/cm^{3}
Melting point	146 to 148 °C (295 to 298 °F; 419 to 421 K)
- Except where otherwise noted, data are given for materials in their standard state (at 25 °C [77 °F], 100 kPa). Infobox references

Oxathiapiprolin (trade names Orondis, Zorvec, and Segovis) is a fungicide. In the United States, the Environmental Protection Agency has approved it for use against several plant diseases including downy mildew and various Phytophthora species including late blight on crops including vegetables, ornamentals, and turf.

Its mechanism of action involves binding to the oxysterol-binding protein in Oomycetes.
