= Peronospora arborescens =

Scientific classification
- Domain: Eukaryota
- Clade: Sar
- Clade: Stramenopiles
- Phylum: Oomycota
- Class: Peronosporomycetes
- Order: Peronosporales
- Family: Peronosporaceae
- Genus: Peronospora
- Species: P. arborescens

Binomial name
- Peronospora arborescens (Berkeley) Caspari, (1855)

Species of single-celled organism

Peronospora arborescens is a plant pathogen. It causes downy mildew on leaves of Papaver spp. It has economic importance on Papaver somniferum grown as an oilseed crop, for example in central and eastern Europe. It is controlled by sanitation, crop rotation, use of clean seed and fungicide sprays of the foliage. There are other species of Peronospora which occur on Papaver: Peronospora argemones (Gäum.), Peronospora cristata (Tranzschel), and Peronospora papaveris-pilosi (Vienn.-Bourg.).
