= Peronospora conglomerata =

Scientific classification
- Domain: Eukaryota
- Clade: Sar
- Clade: Stramenopiles
- Phylum: Oomycota
- Class: Peronosporomycetes
- Order: Peronosporales
- Family: Peronosporaceae
- Genus: Peronospora
- Species: P. conglomerata

Binomial name
- Peronospora conglomerata Fuckel, Fungi rhenani: no. 25 (1863)

Species of downy mildew infecting Geraniums

Peronospora conglomerata is a biotrophic plant pathogen (part of the downy mildew taxon) which affects geranium species. Its conidiophores are tree-like and come from the stomata on the leaves. The conidiophores cover the underside of the affected plant's leaves in white patches. These patches may later turn purple or brown. The result of infection by Peronospora conglomerata is scrunched up, yellow leaves that are reduced in size and are prone to falling off.
