= Skalický =

Skalický is a surname. Notable people with the surname include:

- Daniel Skalický (born 1991), Czech ice hockey player
- Pavol Skalický (born 1995), Slovak ice hockey player
- Peter Skalicky (born 1941), rector of TU Wien, Austria.
