= Peronospora dianthi =

Scientific classification
- Domain: Eukaryota
- Clade: Sar
- Clade: Stramenopiles
- Phylum: Oomycota
- Class: Peronosporomycetes
- Order: Peronosporales
- Family: Peronosporaceae
- Genus: Peronospora
- Species: P. dianthi

Binomial name
- Peronospora dianthi de Bary

Species of single-celled organism

Peronospora dianthi is a plant pathogen for which the binomial authority is Heinrich Anton de Bary.
