= Peronospora trifoliorum =

Scientific classification
- Domain: Eukaryota
- Clade: Sar
- Clade: Stramenopiles
- Division: Oomycota
- Class: Peronosporomycetes
- Order: Peronosporales
- Family: Peronosporaceae
- Genus: Peronospora
- Species: P. trifoliorum

Binomial name
- Peronospora trifoliorum de Bary, (1863)

Synonyms
- Peronospora fulva Peronospora lentis Peronospora lotorum Peronospora pratensis Peronospora trifolii-arvensis Peronospora trifolii-hybridi Peronospora trifolii-pratensis Peronospora trifolii-repentis Peronospora trifolii-repentis f. trifolii-hybridi Peronospora trifoliorum f. trifolii-arvensis Peronospora trifoliorum f. trifolii-pratensis Peronospora trifoliorum f. trifolii-rubentis

Species of single-celled organism

Peronospora trifoliorum, commonly known as downy mildew of alfalfa, is an oomycete plant pathogen infecting alfalfa.

== Hosts and symptoms ==
Peronospora trifoliorum commonly infects numerous strains and varieties of alfalfa. On alfalfa, the primary symptoms of Peronospora trifoliorum are chlorotic leaf blotches that range from light green to yellow-green to gray-green; rolled or downturned leaves; and thickened, stunted stems ending in rosette-like growths. The main method of identifying the disease is by the moldy, downy growth on the underside of leaves that appears white, gray, or light purple as this is a diagnostic sign of downy mildew of alfalfa (Davis, Frate, and Putnam, 2017). Only seedlings and young tissue are susceptible to infection which, with proper cultural controls, can limit the development and progression of the disease. There is also the potential for secondary infection, which can occur every five days during ideal conditions (Goldberg, 2000).

Peronospora trifoliorum has been reported from Trifolium repens but it is uncommon.

== Environment ==
Peronospora trifoliorum prefers high humidity and moderate to warm temperatures. Peak spore production and infection occurs around 65 °F (18 °C), though the pathogen is active in temperatures between 40 and 85 °F (4 and 29 °C) (Goldberg, 2000). This means that Peronospora trifoliorum is primarily seen during cool, wet periods in the summer or warmer, dry periods in the spring and fall, and is usually found in the midwestern and southern United States (UW-Extension, 2006). Since Peronospora trifoliorum is an oomycete, free moisture is needed for the disease to spread as well as to infect tissue (Goldberg, 2000). The disease may overwinter in dead leaf debris, in crown buds, or in seeds (UW-Extension, 2006: Pacific Northwest Extension, 2019).

== Management ==
Growing resistant varieties of alfalfa is the most common form of control used against Peronospora trifoliorum (Samac, Rhodes, and Lamp, 2015). A form of cultural control, resistant varieties limit the ability of the disease to infect and survive in the plant. Another cultural control is to cut the alfalfa crop early, which removes the infectious conidia (Samac, Rhodes, and Lamp, 2015) while limiting the amount of foliage lost, removing the infected tissue, and decreasing the moisture and humidity through increased air circulation (Pacific Northwest Extension, 2019). While cultural controls are believed to be the most effective form of control against Peronospora trifoliorum, the use of chemical control in the form of metalaxyl and mefenoxam is common and effective for alfalfa seedlings (Samac, Rhodes, and Lamp, 2015). These systemic fungicides are used to suppress the infectious stage of the disease. Additionally, there have been attempts to find alternative methods to control Peronospora trifoliorum: a 2011 study used various biotic and abiotic compounds to test the use of bio- and chemical controls on different alfalfa diseases. The study found that to some degree, salicylic acid, potassium phosphite, neem oil, Bio-Arec, and Bio-Zaid betaine all protect against downy mildew and numerous other alfalfa diseases (Mohamed Morsy, Fawzy Abdel-Monaim, and Mamoud Mazen, 2011).
