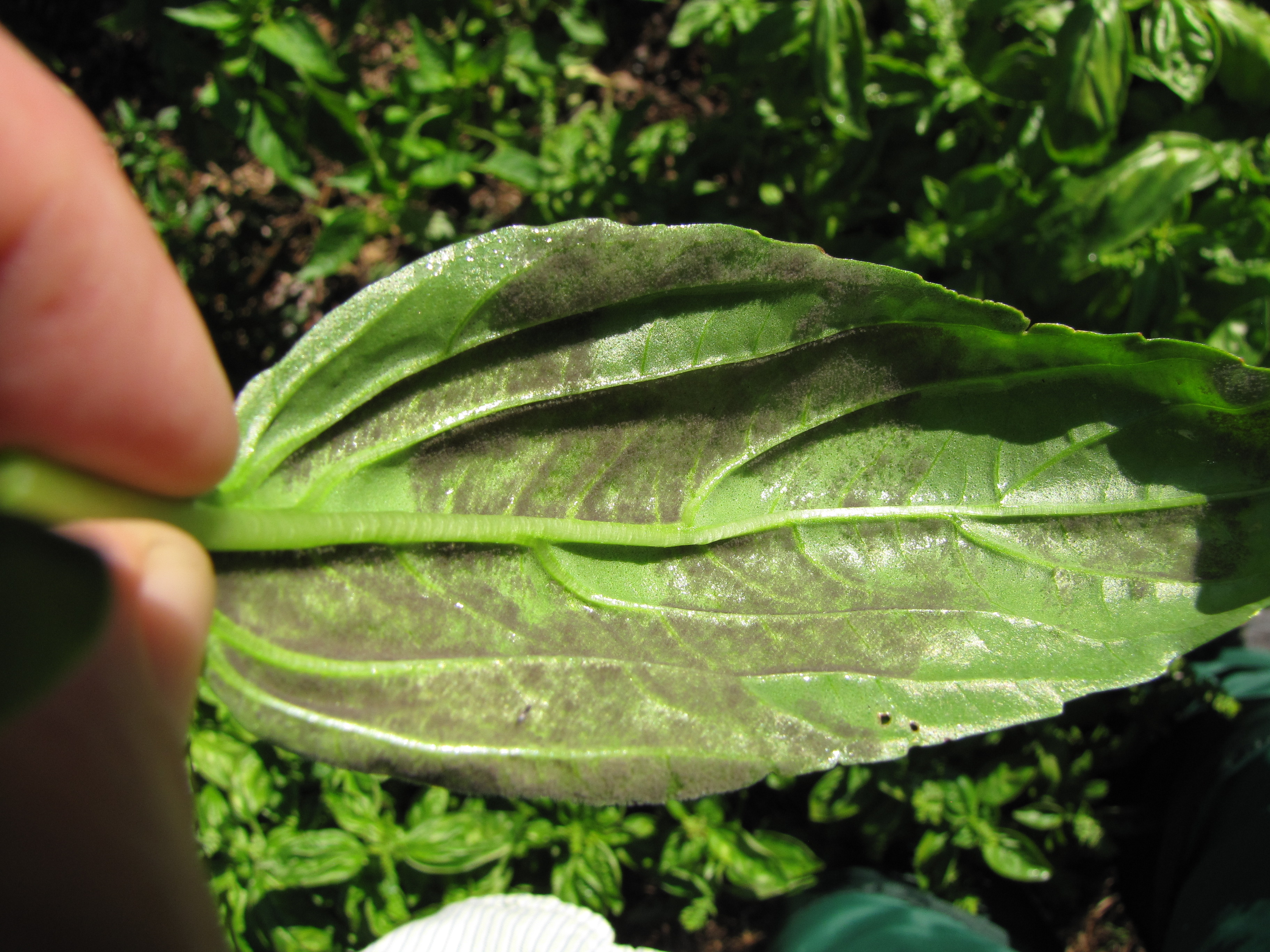
- Basil plant in Hawaii infected with Peronospora belbahrii

Scientific classification
- Domain: Eukaryota
- Clade: Sar
- Clade: Stramenopiles
- Phylum: Oomycota
- Class: Peronosporomycetes
- Order: Peronosporales
- Family: Peronosporaceae
- Genus: Peronospora
- Species: P. belbahrii

Binomial name
- Peronospora belbahrii Thines

= Peronospora belbahrii =

Species of single-celled organism

Peronospora belbahrii, common name basil downy mildew, is a pathogenic water mold that affects basil species. Rapidly spread by windborn spores, the pathogen was first discovered in Italy in 2003. In 2007 it was detected in Florida and by 2008 had already spread to outdoor and greenhouse basil crops in the United States and Canada. Infections are untreatable and usually lead to complete crop loss, although multiple mildew-resistant cultivars have been developed and are now available for commercial and home growers. Leaves from affected plants are unmarketable due to their unappetizing appearance, but remain safe for human consumption.
