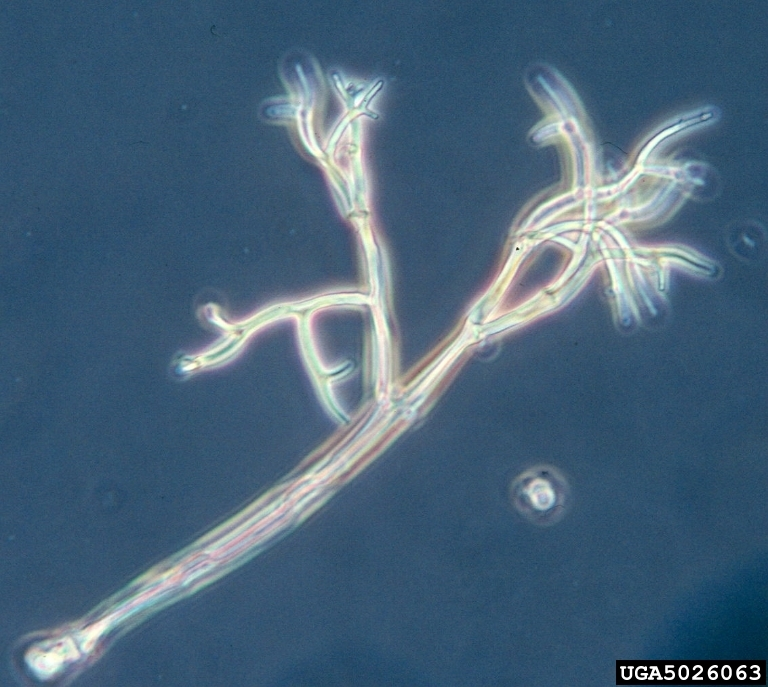

Scientific classification
- Domain: Eukaryota
- Clade: Sar
- Clade: Stramenopiles
- Phylum: Oomycota
- Class: Peronosporomycetes
- Order: Peronosporales
- Family: Peronosporaceae
- Genus: Peronospora
- Species: P. sparsa

Binomial name
- Peronospora sparsa Berk., (1862)

Synonyms
- Peronoplasmopara sparsa (Berk.) Uljan., (1967); Peronospora fragariae Roze & Cornu, (1876); Peronospora rosae-gallicae Savul. & Rayss, (1934); Peronospora rubi Rabenh. ex J. Schröt., (1888); Pseudoperonospora sparsa (Berk.) Jacz., (1928)

= Peronospora sparsa =

Species of single-celled organism

Peronospora sparsa is an oomycete plant pathogen that causes downy mildew in berry producing plants; especially in the genus's Rubus and Rosa. Downy mildew plant pathogens are often host specific and cause problems in cloudberries, blackberries, boysenberries, strawberries, and arctic bramble. Since they are host specific, Peronospora sparsa will not cause downy mildew in grapes because a different plant pathogen causes downy mildew in grapes; Plasmopara viticola. Although it depends on the cultivar, symptoms do not normally start until later stages of disease and can look different on different plants. The most common symptoms include red lesions in the veins of leaves, with dry and deformed berries.

== Importance ==
Peronospora sparsa causes fluctuations in yield of berries. A few examples are downy mildew on the Arctic Bramble issue in Finland and Colombian greenhouse rose production. Finland and Sweden have a great environment for an oomycete to thrive. Oomycetes are watermolds therefore cool, wet, humid conditions are perfect. The Arctic Bramble berries are used to make special Finland spelling liquor. However the irregular yield and “dryberry” effect from downy mildew has restricted the expansion of the industry. Downy mildew can devastate a crop in a short amount of time.

== Environment ==
Oomycetes are watermolds therefore cool, wet, humid conditions are what they prefer. Peronospora sparsa is also an obligate biotroph. This means they require a living host to survive and reproduce. Obligate biotrophs are also commonly called obligate parasites because their existence is detrimental to the host.

== Disease cycle ==
Downy mildew spread mostly by conidia, which are asexual spores. Conidia are often carried by wind or rain onto the leaves, stem, or berries. From there, they develop secondary infections which means this pathogen has a polycyclic life cycle. After the secondary infection the disease will continue to spread very fast if uninterrupted.

== Management ==
The best control of Peronospora sparsa are resistant plant cultivars. Since this is a polycyclic disease that spreads by conidia, it's important to use disease management practices in the early stages of its life cycle. However, it can be hard to do so because symptoms of don't show until the disease has progressed and different cultivars can have different symptoms. The European Union has changed their legislation on pesticide use which is causing farmers to change their ways. "The products ALIETTE (fungicide), PHOSFIK (leaf fertiliser) and BION (pathogen defence elicitor) were effective in downy mildew control, Aliette and Phosfik being more effective than Bion especially in preventing yield losses. No arctic bramble cultivars known to be resistant to downy mildew are available." However, there are some cultivars that are less susceptible to infection. A few rose and blackberries have been found to be more resistant but breeding and other control methods need to be put in place.

The government has changed laws and will likely continue to become more restrictive around the world with pesticides. Constant use of fungicides can cause pathogen mutations and no longer control the downy mildew. Therefore, the best control is plant resistance.
