= Podosphaera curvispora =

Scientific classification
- Kingdom: Fungi
- Division: Ascomycota
- Class: Leotiomycetes
- Order: Helotiales
- Family: Erysiphaceae
- Genus: Podosphaera
- Species: P. curvispora

Binomial name
- Podosphaera curvispora Y. Nomura, 1984

Species of fungus

Podosphaera curvispora is a species of powdery mildew in the family Erysiphaceae. It is found in East Asia and endemic to Japan, where it affects plants in the genus Sorbus.

== Description ==
The fungus forms a thin coating on host leaves, typically on young shoots and new branches. Podosphaera curvispora, like most Erysiphaceae, is highly host-specific and infects only a single genus. Various other species also infect Sorbus, most notably Podosphaera aucupariae in Europe and North America. Podosphaera clandestina has been reported on the same hosts as P. curvispora in Japan.

== Taxonomy ==
The fungus was formally described in 1984 by Y. Nomura.
