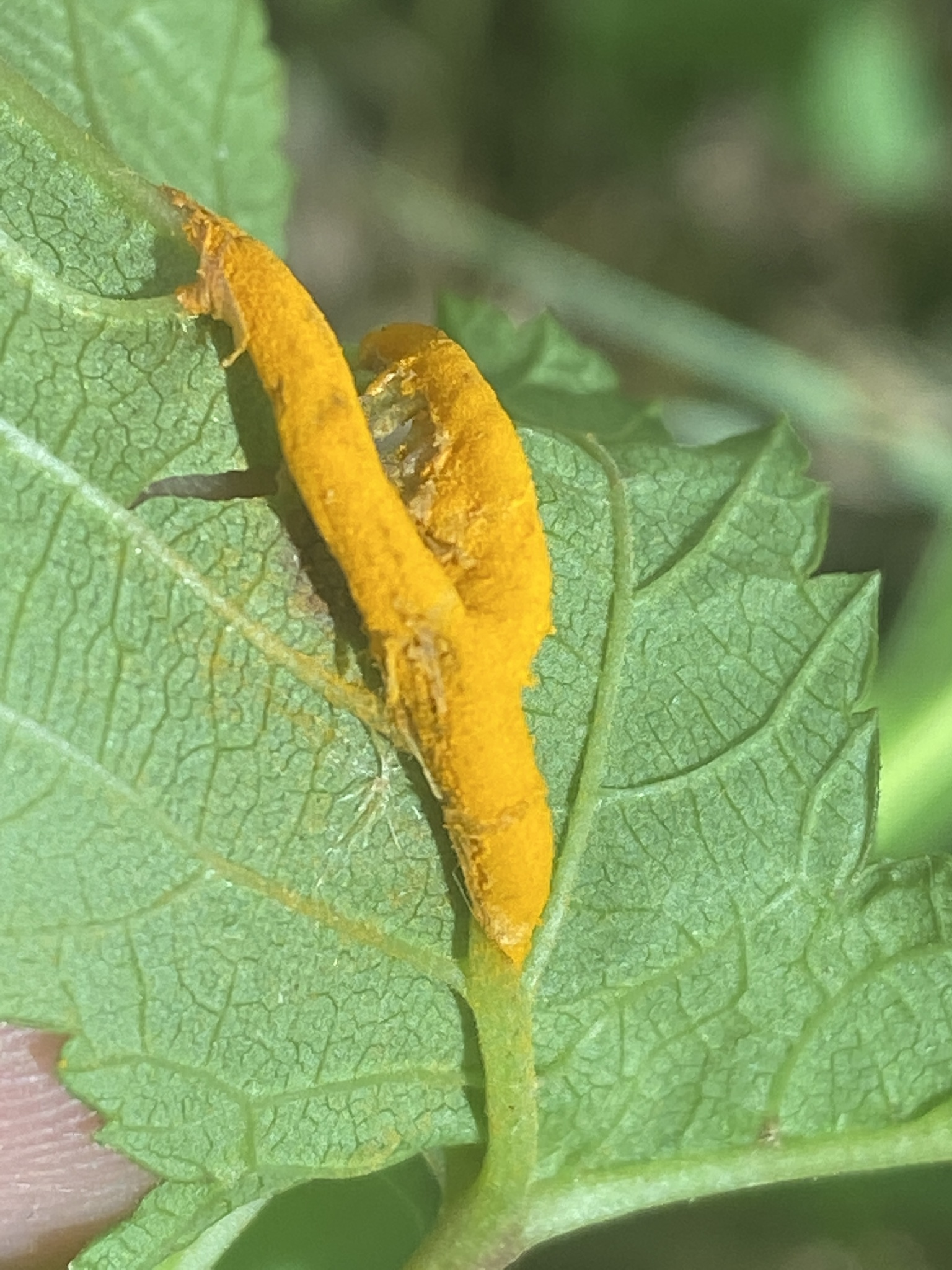
- Triphragmium ulmariae

Scientific classification
- Kingdom: Fungi
- Division: Basidiomycota
- Class: Pucciniomycetes
- Order: Pucciniales
- Family: Raveneliaceae; Leppik (1972)

Type genus
- Ravenelia Berk. (1853)

= Raveneliaceae =

Family of fungi

The Raveneliaceae are a family of rust fungi in the order Pucciniales. The family contains 26 genera and about 323 species.

== Genera ==
- Allotelium
- Anthomyces
- Anthomycetella
- Apra
- Bibulocystis
- Cumminsina
- Cystomyces
- Diabole
- Diabolidium
- Dicheirinia
- Diorchidiella
- Diorchidium
- Endoraecium
- Esalque
- Hapalophragmium
- Kernkampella
- Lipocystis
- Nyssopsora
- Ravenelia
- Reyesiella
- Sphaerophragmium
- Sphenospora
- Spumula
- Triphragmiopsis
- Triphragmium
- Ypsilospora
