= C13H24N4O3S =

The molecular formula C_{13}H_{24}N_{4}O_{3}S (molar mass: 316.42 g/mol, exact mass: 316.1569 u) may refer to:

- Bupirimate
- Timolol
