= Podosphaera longiseta =

Scientific classification
- Kingdom: Fungi
- Division: Ascomycota
- Class: Leotiomycetes
- Order: Helotiales
- Family: Erysiphaceae
- Genus: Podosphaera
- Species: P. longiseta

Binomial name
- Podosphaera longiseta Sawada, 1951

Species of fungus

Podosphaera longiseta is a species of powdery mildew in the family Erysiphaceae. It is found in Japan, where it affects plants in the genus Prunus.

== Description ==
The fungus forms thin white evanescent mycelium on host leaves. Podosphaera longiseta, like most Erysiphaceae, is highly host-specific and is only known from Prunus buergiana and Pr. grayana. Many other species of powdery mildews also infect plants of the genus Prunus, so care should be taken in identification. Podosphaera longiseta differs from other members of the Podosphaera tridactyla complex, to which it is closely related, in having longer appendages with up to six septa.

== Taxonomy ==
The fungus was formally described in 1951 by Sawada. The species was reduced to synonymy with the variable Podosphaera tridactyla (which has since been split by Meeboon et al.) by Uwe Braun in 1987, but was reinstated as a separate species by Braun and Roger T.A. Cook in 2012.
