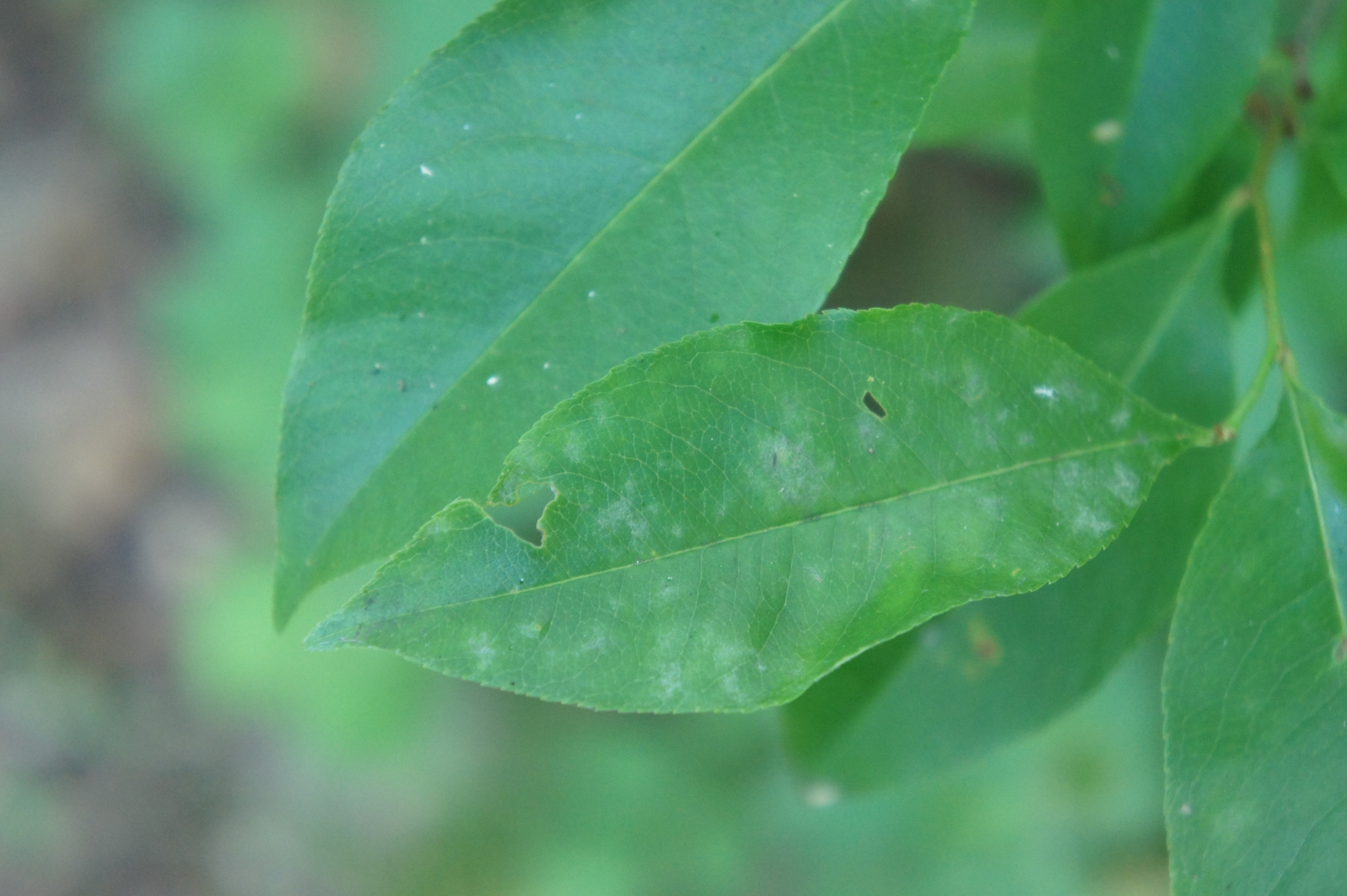
- Podosphaera prunicola on Prunus in the UK.

Scientific classification
- Kingdom: Fungi
- Division: Ascomycota
- Class: Leotiomycetes
- Order: Helotiales
- Family: Erysiphaceae
- Genus: Podosphaera
- Species: P. prunicola

Binomial name
- Podosphaera prunicola U. Braun, 2012

Synonyms
- Podosphaera oxycanthae f. pruni (Juel) S. Bumer, 1933

= Podosphaera prunicola =

Species of fungus

Podosphaera prunicola is a species of powdery mildew in the family Erysiphaceae. It is found in North America and Eurasia, where it affects plants in the genus Prunus.

== Description ==
The fungus forms effuse or patchy, white to greyish mycelium on host leaves. Podosphaera prunicola, like most Erysiphaceae, is highly host-specific and infects only Prunus. There are a great many other species of powdery mildew on Prunus, so care should be taken with identification. In North America, P. prunicola is the most common widespread Prunus powdery mildew species, common on hosts such as Prunus virginiana. In Europe, it occurs on introduced Prunus from North America, most often Prunus serotina.

== Taxonomy ==
Podosphaera prunicola was originally described by Jaczewski in 1927 as Podosphaera oxycanthae f. pruni. The forma was elevated to a species by Uwe Braun in 2012.
