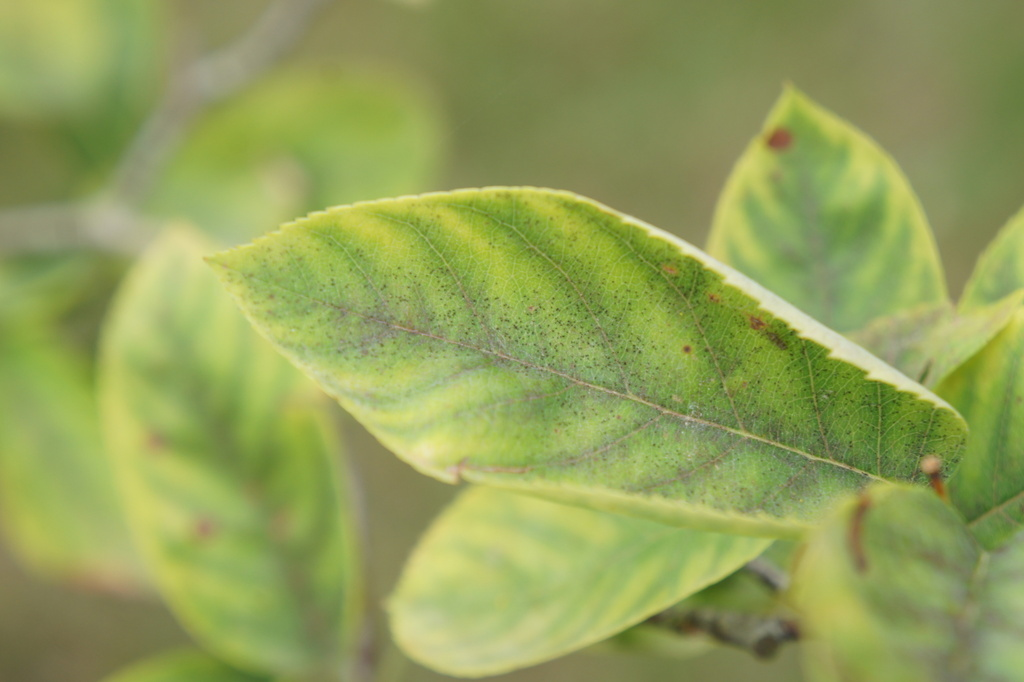
- Podosphaera amelanchieris on Amelanchier

Scientific classification
- Kingdom: Fungi
- Division: Ascomycota
- Class: Leotiomycetes
- Order: Helotiales
- Family: Erysiphaceae
- Genus: Podosphaera; Kunze, 1823

Type species
- Podosphaera myrtillina Kunze, 1823

Synonyms
- Kokkalera Ponnappa, 1970; Leucothallia Trevis., 1853; Sphaerotheca Lév., 1851; Fibroidium (R.T.A. Cook, A.J. Inman & C. Billings) R.T.A. Cook & U. Braun, 2012

= Podosphaera =

Genus of fungi

Podosphaera is a genus of obligate biotrophic fungi in the family Erysiphaceae (powdery mildews). It can be found on all continents except Antarctica, infecting a large number of different genera.

== Description ==
The vast majority of species in the genus Podosphaera infect hosts of the Rosaceae. Symptoms of an infection by Podosphaera species include mycelium on most often the upperside of leaves or on young shoots and twigs.

== Taxonomy ==
The genus was formally described by Kunze in 1823. The genus Sphaerotheca was absorbed into Podosphaera in 2000 by Braun and Takamatsu. The anamorph genus of Podosphaera was Fibroidium. In 2012, due to the 'one fungus, one name' change to the Code, species from this genus were also included in Podosphaera.

== Species ==
- Podosphaera amelanchieris Maurizio, 1927
- Podosphaera aphanis (Wallr.) U. Braun & S. Takam., 2000
- Podosphaera aucupariae Erikss., 1886
- Podosphaera balsaminae
- Podosphaera cercidiphylli Tanda & Y. Nomura, 1986
- Podosphaera clandestina (Wallr.) Lév., 1851
- Podosphaera curvispora Y. Nomura, 1984
- Podosphaera delphinii (P. Karst.) U. Braun & S. Takam., 2000
- Podosphaera dipsacacearum
- Podosphaera erineophila Naumov, 1927
- Podosphaera euphorbiae
- Podosphaera euphorbiae-hirtae
- Podosphaera epilobii (Wallr.) de Bary, 1870
- Podosphaera ferruginea (Schltdl.) U. Braun & S. Takam., 2000
- Podosphaera filipendulae (Z.Y. Zhao) T.Z. Liu & U. Braun, 2010
- Podosphaera fugax (Penz. & Sacc.) U. Braun & S. Takam., 2000
- Podosphaera fuliginea (Schltdl.) U. Braun & S. Takam., 2000
- Podosphaera fusca (Fr.) U. Braun & Shishkoff, 2000
- Podosphaera helianthemi
- Podosphaera leucotricha (Ellis & Everh.) E.S. Salmon, 1900
- Podosphaera longiseta Sawada, 1951
- Podosphaera macularis (Wallr.) U. Braun & S. Takam., 2000
- Podosphaera minor Howe, 1874
- Podosphaera mors-uvae
- Podosphaera myrtillina (C. Schub.) Kunze, 1823
- Podosphaera pannosa (Wallr.) de Bary, 1870
- Podosphaera parietariae
- Podosphaera physocarpi (U. Braun) U. Braun, 2012
- Podosphaera plantaginis (Castagne) U. Braun & S. Takam., 2000
- Podosphaera polemonii
- Podosphaera prunicola U. Braun, 2012
- Podosphaera salatai Heluta, U. Braun & Gvrit., 2005
- Podosphaera spiraeae
- Podosphaera thalictri
- Podosphaera tridactyla (Wallr.) de Bary, 1870
- Podosphaera volkartii
- Podosphaera xanthii (Castagne) U. Braun & Shishkoff, 2000
