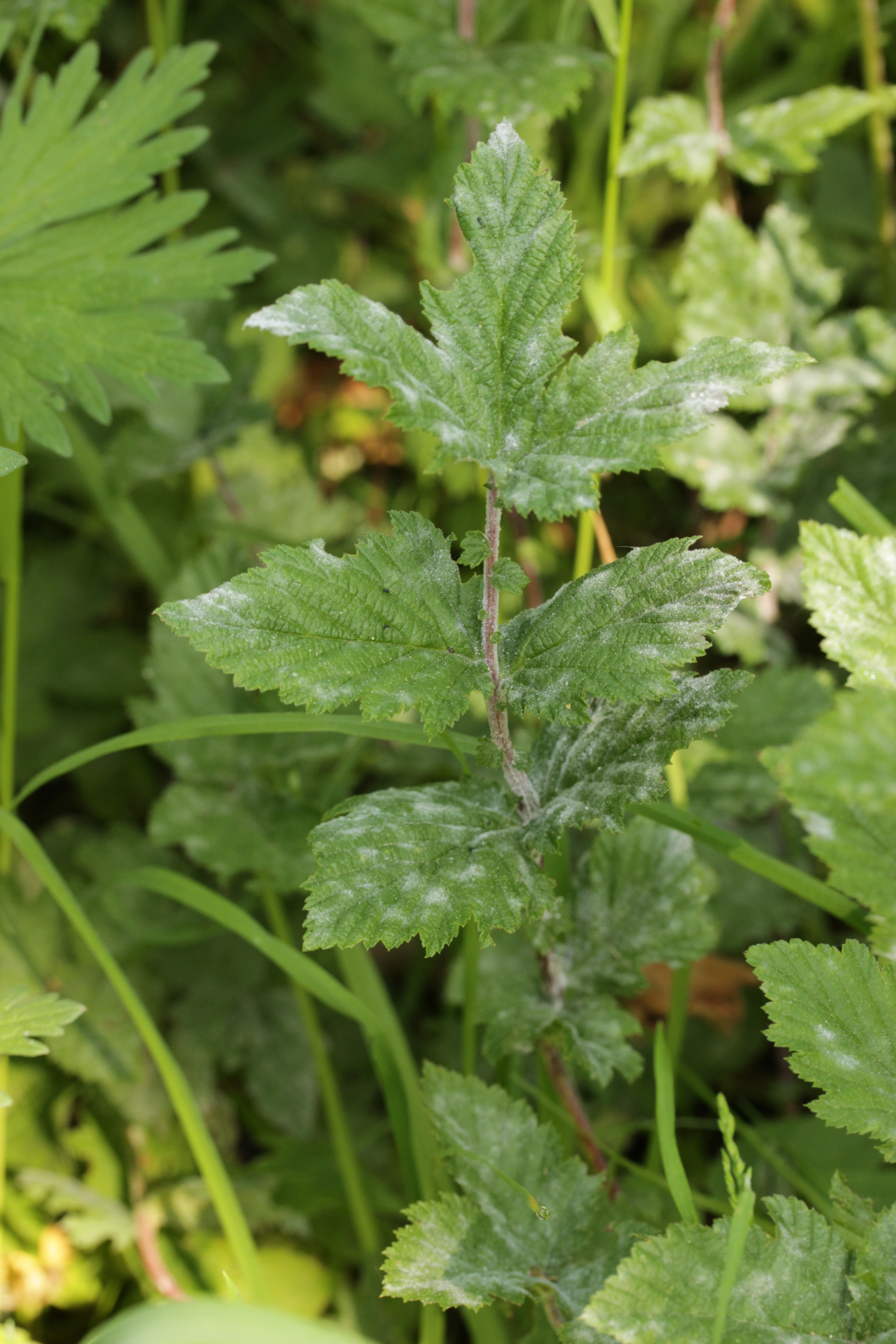

Scientific classification
- Kingdom: Fungi
- Division: Ascomycota
- Class: Leotiomycetes
- Order: Helotiales
- Family: Erysiphaceae
- Genus: Podosphaera
- Species: P. filipendulae

Binomial name
- Podosphaera filipendulae (Z.Y. Zhao) T.Z. Liu & U. Braun (2010)

Synonyms
- Sphaerotheca filipendulae Z. Y. Zhao (1981); Torula botryoides Corda (1829)

= Podosphaera filipendulae =

Species of fungus

Podosphaera filipendulae is a fungal species that belongs to the genus Podosphaera and the order Erysiphaceae. It was first described with meadowsweet (Filipendula ulmaria) as the host plant.

Podosphaera filipendulae is morphologically identical to Podosphaera spiraeae and was considered synonymous. However, DNA sequencing can distinguish between isolates of the two species so they are currently considered separate species.

This fungus is a pathogen of meadowsweet that causes powdery mildew on the plant's leaves and flower heads and distorts their growth. It can be evident throughout the growth cycle from spring to autumn. It produces chains of oval conidia as well as groups of cleistothecia.
