= Phyllactinia amelanchieris =

Scientific classification
- Kingdom: Fungi
- Division: Ascomycota
- Class: Leotiomycetes
- Order: Helotiales
- Family: Erysiphaceae
- Genus: Phyllactinia
- Species: P. amelanchieris

Binomial name
- Phyllactinia amelanchieris M. Bradshaw & J.K. Mitch., 2025

Species of fungus

Phyllactinia amelanchieris is a species of powdery mildew in the family Erysiphaceae. It is found in North America, where it affects the genus Amelanchier.

== Description ==
The fungus forms a weak, very thin, often smooth coating on the undersides of leaves. P. amelanchieris, like most Erysiphaceae, is highly host-specific and infects only the genus Amelanchier. Another species of powdery mildew also infects this genus: Podosphaera amelanchieris, which forms a thin, light, weak coating on host leaves, rarely distorting growth from the underside.

== Taxonomy ==
The fungus was formally described in 2025 by Michael Bradshaw and James Kameron Mitchell.
