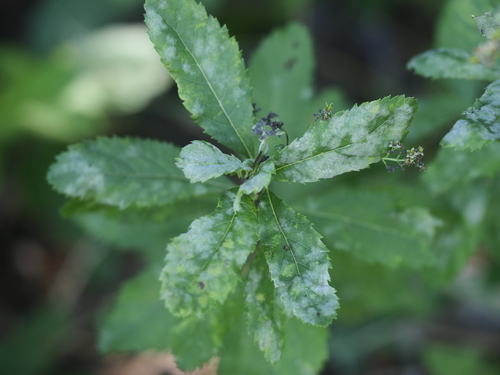
- Podosphaera minor on Spiraea in Canada.

Scientific classification
- Kingdom: Fungi
- Division: Ascomycota
- Class: Leotiomycetes
- Order: Erysiphales
- Family: Erysiphaceae
- Genus: Podosphaera
- Species: P. minor

Binomial name
- Podosphaera minor Howe, 1874

Synonyms
- Microsphaera fulvofulcra Cooke, 1877; Podosphaera oxycanthae f. spiraeae Jacz., 1927

= Podosphaera minor =

Species of fungus

Podosphaera minor is a species of powdery mildew in the family Erysiphaceae. It is found in the Americas and Eurasia, where it affects plants in the genus Spiraea.

== Description ==
The fungus forms greyish, thin mycelium on host leaves. Podosphaera minor, like most Erysiphaceae, is highly host-specific and infects only Spiraea. Other species also infect the same genus, including Podosphaera spiraeae which is common on cultivated Spiraea in the same regions as P. minor, but rather causes dense, whitish, shoot-distorting growth. Podosphaera spiraeae-douglasii can be found on Spiraea douglasii. Podosphaera spiraeicola is found in East Asia.

== Taxonomy ==
The fungus was formally described in 1874 by Howe. The species comprises two varieties: var. minor and var. longissima. The former has shorter chasmothecial appendages than the latter, which is found in North America.
