= Podosphaera physocarpi =

Scientific classification
- Kingdom: Fungi
- Division: Ascomycota
- Class: Leotiomycetes
- Order: Helotiales
- Family: Erysiphaceae
- Genus: Podosphaera
- Species: P. physocarpi

Binomial name
- Podosphaera physocarpi (U. Braun) U. Braun, 2012

Synonyms
- Sphaerotheca aphanis var. physocarpi U. Braun, 1984; Sphaerotheca macularis f. neilliae Jacz., 1927

Species of fungus

Podosphaera physocarpi is a species of powdery mildew in the family Erysiphaceae. It is found across Europe and North America, where it affects the genus Physocarpus.

== Description ==
The fungus forms a chalky coating on the leaves of its host, coating and often significantly distorting leaves and stems up to whole shoots and inflorescences. It is the only species of powdery mildew on its host, and like many Erysiphaceae, only infects one genus.

== Taxonomy ==
The fungus was formally described in 1984 by Uwe Braun, with the basionym Sphaerotheca aphanis var. physocarpi. This was then revised by Braun in 2012 with the name Podosphaera physocarpi.
