= Podosphaera erineophila =

Scientific classification
- Kingdom: Fungi
- Division: Ascomycota
- Class: Leotiomycetes
- Order: Helotiales
- Family: Erysiphaceae
- Genus: Podosphaera
- Species: P. erineophila

Binomial name
- Podosphaera erineophila Naumov, 1927

Species of fungus

Podosphaera erineophila is a species of powdery mildew in the family Erysiphaceae. It is found across Eurasia and North America, where it affects the genera Fagus and Betula. Unusually among powdery mildews, it is almost exclusively found on erineum mite galls such as those of the genus Acalitus.

== Description ==
The fungus forms inconspicuous mycelium on the underside host leaves, on erineum galls. This sort of infection is unique in the genus Podosphaera.

== Taxonomy ==
The fungus was formally described in 1927 by Naumov. The specific epithet derives from the species' habit of infecting erineum mite galls.
