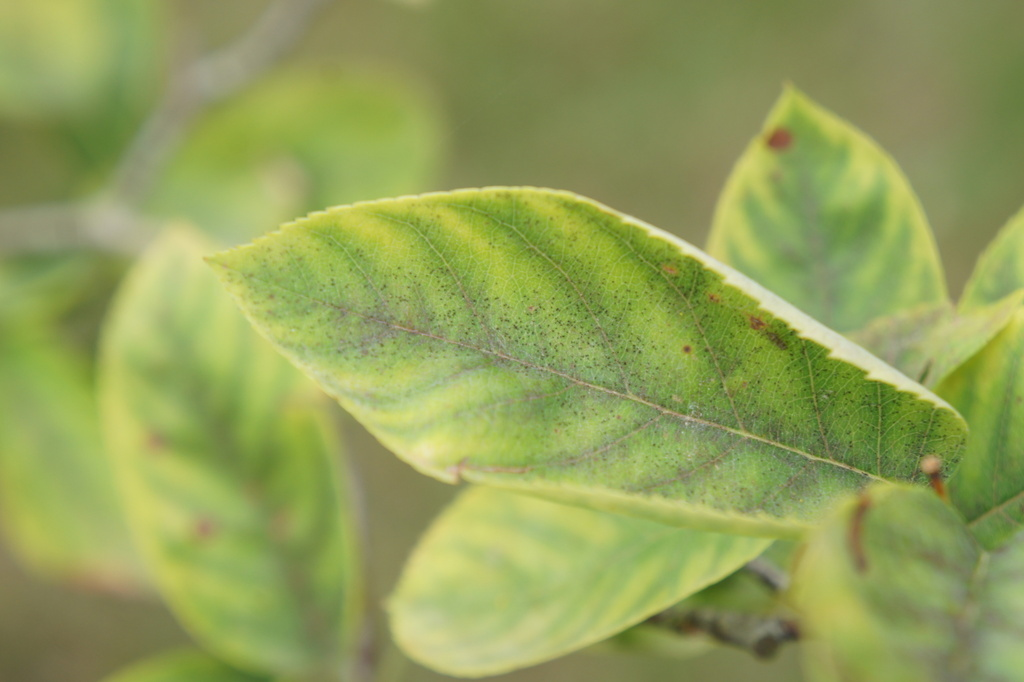
- Podosphaera amelanchieris on Amelanchier in the UK.

Scientific classification
- Kingdom: Fungi
- Division: Ascomycota
- Class: Leotiomycetes
- Order: Helotiales
- Family: Erysiphaceae
- Genus: Podosphaera
- Species: P. amelanchieris

Binomial name
- Podosphaera amelanchieris Maurizio, 1927

Synonyms
- Podosphaera oxyacanthae f. amelanchieris Jacz., 1927

= Podosphaera amelanchieris =

Species of fungus

Podosphaera amelanchieris is a species of powdery mildew in the family Erysiphaceae. It is found across Europe and North America, where it affects the genus Amelanchier.

== Description ==
The fungus forms a thin, light, weak coating on host leaves, rarely distorting growth from the underside. Podosphaera amelanchieris, like most Erysiphaceae, is highly host-specific and infects only the genus Amelanchier. Another species of powdery mildew also infects this genus: Phyllactinia amelanchieris, which has weak, very thin, often smooth growth, on the undersides of leaves.

== Taxonomy ==
The fungus was formally described in 1927 by Maurizio. The specific epithet derives from the host genus.
