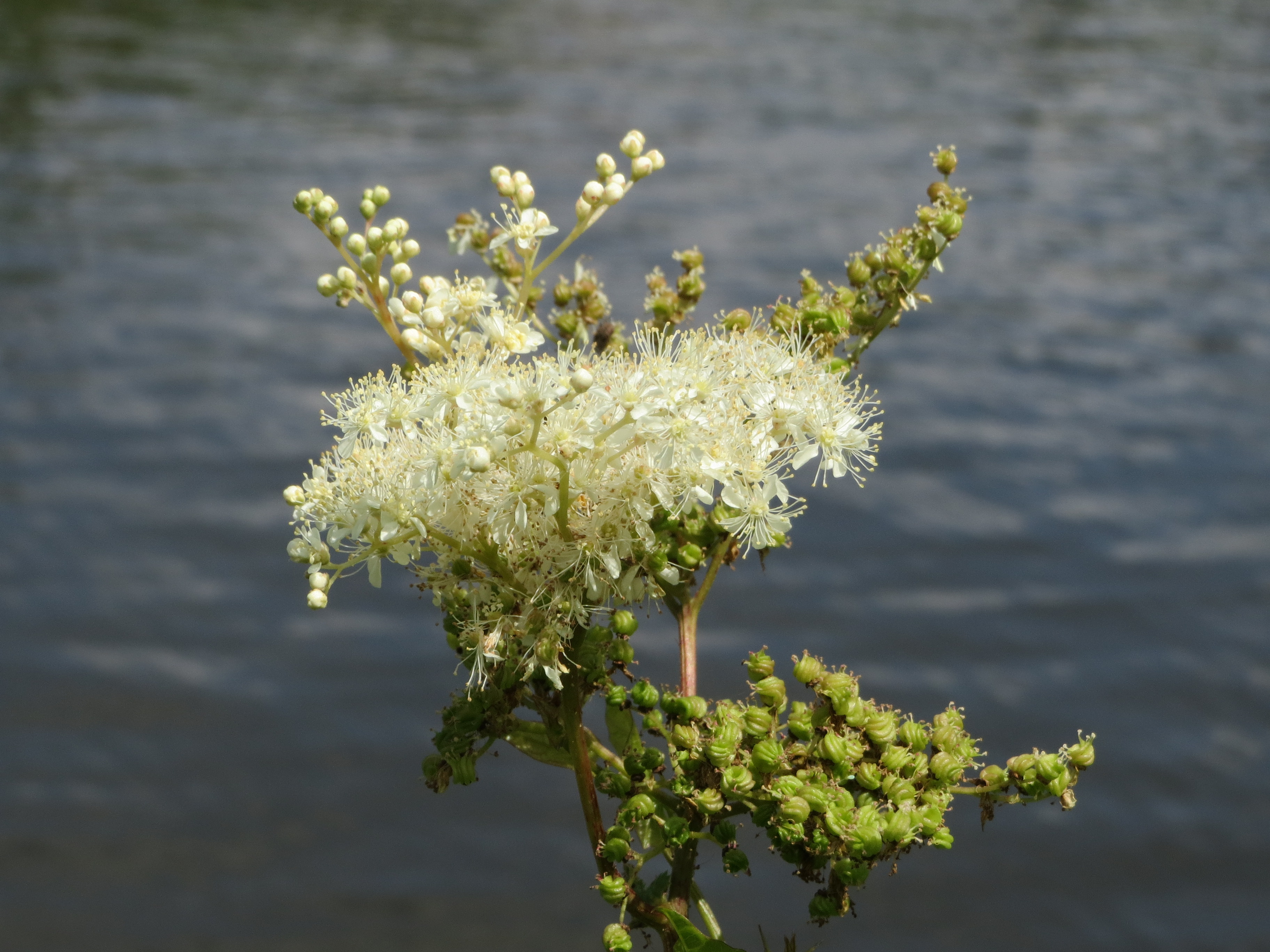

Conservation status
- Least Concern (IUCN 3.1)

- Secure (NatureServe)

Scientific classification
- Kingdom: Plantae
- Clade: Tracheophytes
- Clade: Angiosperms
- Clade: Eudicots
- Clade: Rosids
- Order: Rosales
- Family: Rosaceae
- Genus: Filipendula
- Species: F. ulmaria

Binomial name
- Filipendula ulmaria (L.) Maxim.

= Filipendula ulmaria =

Meadowsweet

Species of plant

Filipendula ulmaria, commonly known as meadowsweet or mead wort, is a perennial herbaceous plant in the family Rosaceae that grows in damp meadows. It is native throughout most of Europe and Western Asia (Near East and Middle East). It has been introduced and naturalised in North America.

Meadowsweet has also been referred to as queen of the meadow, pride of the meadow, meadow-wort, meadow queen, lady of the meadow, dollof, meadsweet, and bridewort.

== Description ==
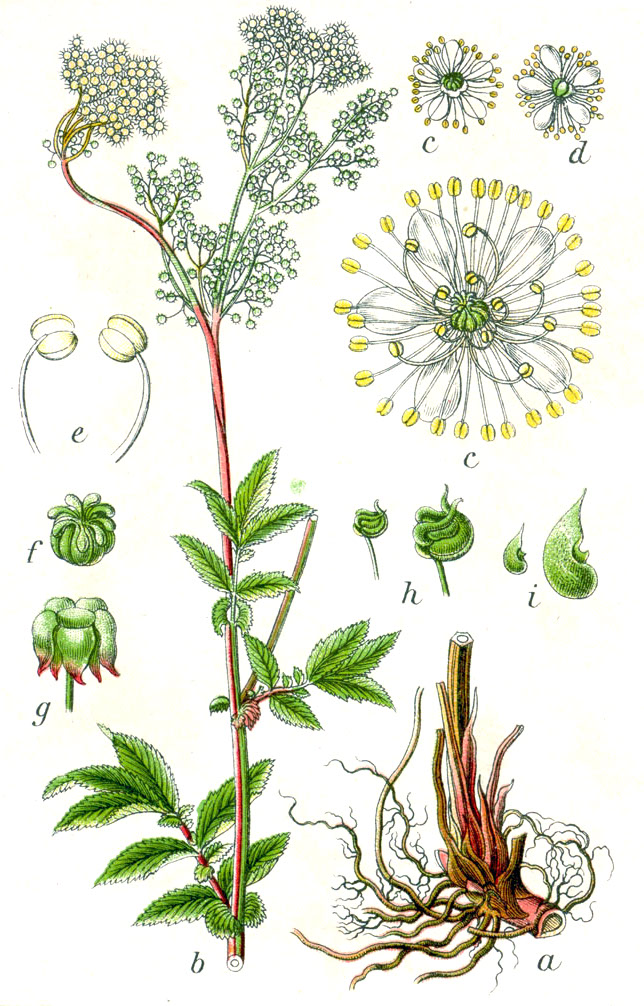
Botanical illustration

The stems, growing to 1–2 metres (3 1/2–6 1/2 ft) tall, erect and furrowed, reddish to sometimes purple. The leaves are dark-green on the upper side and whitish and downy underneath, much divided, interruptedly pinnate, having a few large serrate leaflets and small intermediate ones. Terminal leaflets are large, 4–8 cm long, and three- to five-lobed.

Meadowsweet has delicate, graceful, creamy-white flowers clustered close together in irregularly-branched cymes, having a very strong, sweet smell redolent of antiseptic. They flower from early summer to early autumn and are visited by various types of insects, in particular Musca flies.

The flowers are small and numerous, they show 5 sepals and 5 petals with 7 to 20 stamens.

== Names ==
The English common name meadowsweet dates from the 16th century. It did not originally mean 'sweet plant of the meadow', but a plant used for sweetening or flavouring mead. An earlier common name dating from the 15th century was 'meadsweet'.

Meadowsweet is known by many other names. In Chaucer's The Knight's Tale it is known as meadwort and was one of the ingredients in a drink called "save". It was also known as bridewort, because it was strewn in churches for festivals and weddings, and often made into bridal garlands. In Europe, it took its name "queen of the meadow" for the way it can dominate a low-lying, damp meadow.

The specific epithet ulmaria means "elmlike", possibly in reference to its individual leaves which resemble those of the elm (Ulmus). The generic name, Filipendula, comes from filum, meaning "thread" and pendulus, meaning "hanging". This is said to describe the slender attachment of root tubers, which hang characteristically on the genus, on fibrous roots.

=== Synonyms ===
Filipendula denudata (J.Presl & C.Presl) Fritsch

== Distribution and habitat ==
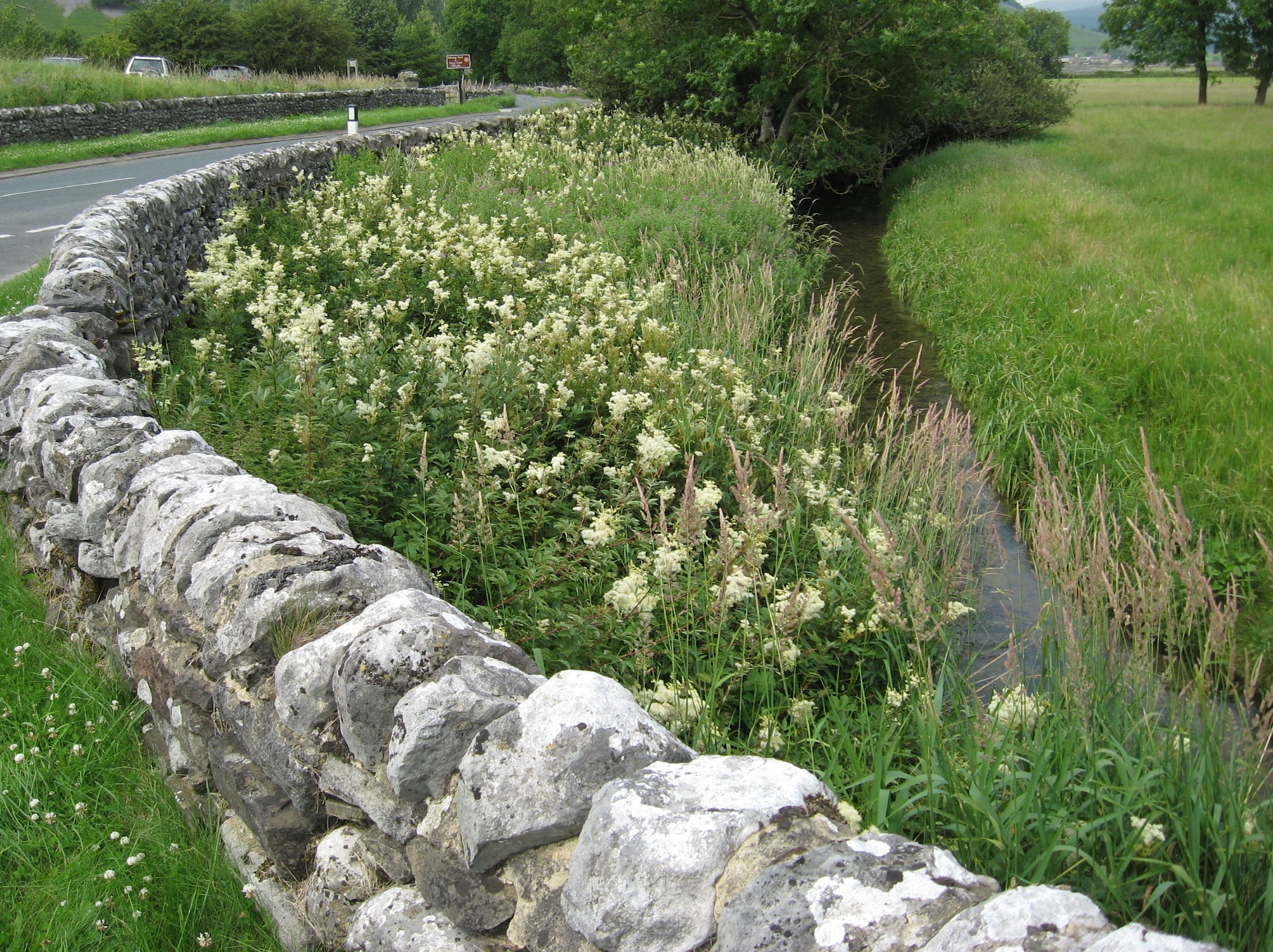
Wild meadowsweet in Wharfedale, near Conistone, North Yorkshire, England

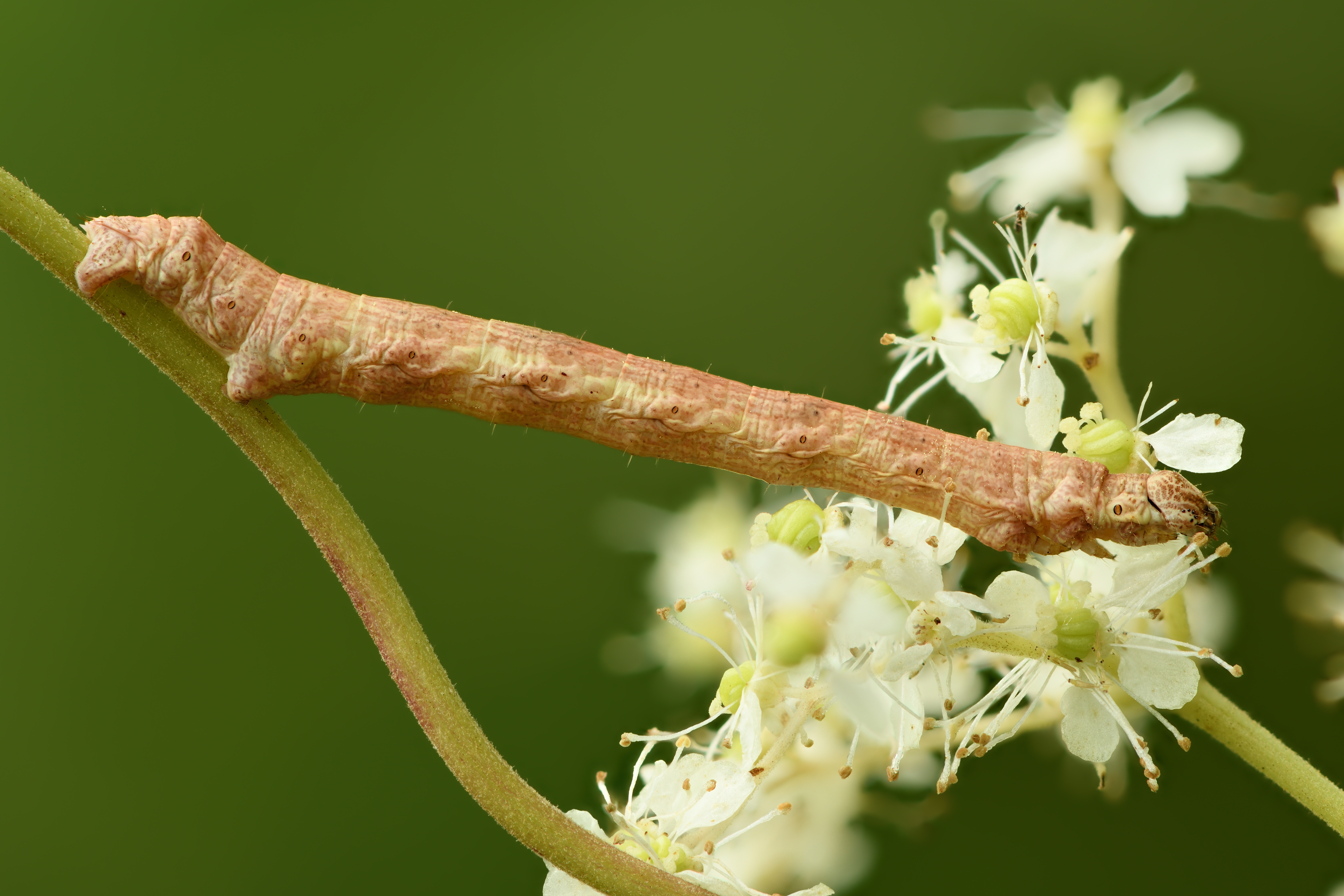
Meadowsweet is the food plant for many species of moth caterpillars

Meadowsweet is common throughout the British Isles in damp areas and is dominant in fens and wet woods.

Juncus subnodulosus-Cirsium palustre fen-meadow and purple moor grass and rush pastures BAP habitat plant associations of Western Europe consistently include this plant.

== Diseases ==
Many insects and fungi cause disease in meadowsweet.

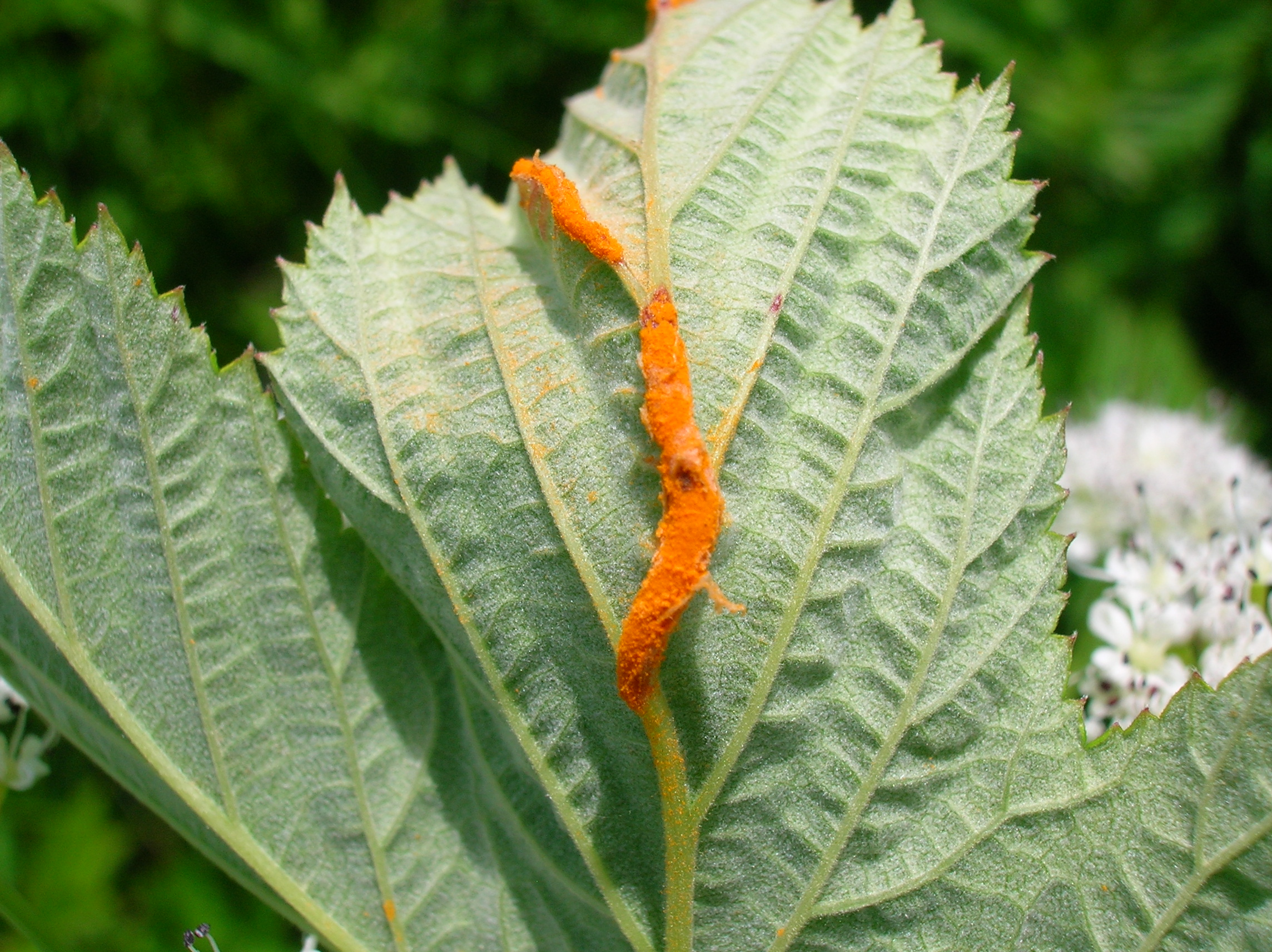
The meadowsweet rust gall on leaf midrib

Meadowsweet leaves are commonly galled by the bright orange-rust fungus Triphragmium ulmariae, which creates swellings and distortions on the stalk and/or midrib.

The fungus Ramularia ulmariae causes purple blotches on the leaves.

The fungus Podosphaera filipendulae causes mildew on the leaves and flower heads, coating them with a white powder.

The midge Dasineura ulmaria causes pinkish-white galls on the leaves that can distort the leaf surface.

== Uses ==
The whole herb possesses a pleasant taste and flavour, the green parts having a similar aromatic character to the flowers, hence the use of the plant as a strewing herb, strewn on floors to give the rooms a pleasant aroma, and its use to flavour vinegar, wine, and beer. The flowers can be added to stewed fruit and jams, giving them a subtle almond flavour. Some foragers also use the flowers to flavour desserts such as panna cotta. It has many medicinal properties. The whole plant is a traditional remedy for an acidic stomach. The dried flowers are used in potpourri. It is also a frequently used spice in Scandinavian varieties of mead.

Chemical constituents include salicin, flavone glycosides, essential oils, and tannins. In 1838, Raffaele Piria obtained salicylic acid from the buds of meadowsweet. Thereafter in 1899, scientists at the firm Bayer used salicylic acid derived from meadowsweet to synthesise acetylsalicylic acid (aspirin), which was named after the old botanical name for meadowsweet, Spiraea ulmaria. The name then became aspirin.

A natural black dye can be obtained from the roots by using a copper mordant.

A tea made from Filipendula ulmaria flowers or leaves has been used in traditional Austrian herbal medicine for the treatment of rheumatism, gout, infections, and fever.

== In culture ==
White-flowered meadowsweet has been found with the cremated remains of three people and at least one animal in a Bronze Age cairn at Fan Foel, Carmarthenshire. Similar finds have also been found inside a beaker from Ashgrove, Fife, and a vessel from North Mains, Strathallan. These could indicate mead or flavoured ale, or might suggest that the plant was placed on the grave as a scented flower.

In Welsh mythology, Gwydion and Math created a woman out of oak blossom, broom, and meadowsweet and named her Blodeuwedd ("flower face").

In the 16th century, when it was customary to strew floors with rushes and herbs (both to give warmth underfoot and to overcome smells and infections), it was a favorite of Elizabeth I of England. She desired it above all other herbs in her chambers.
