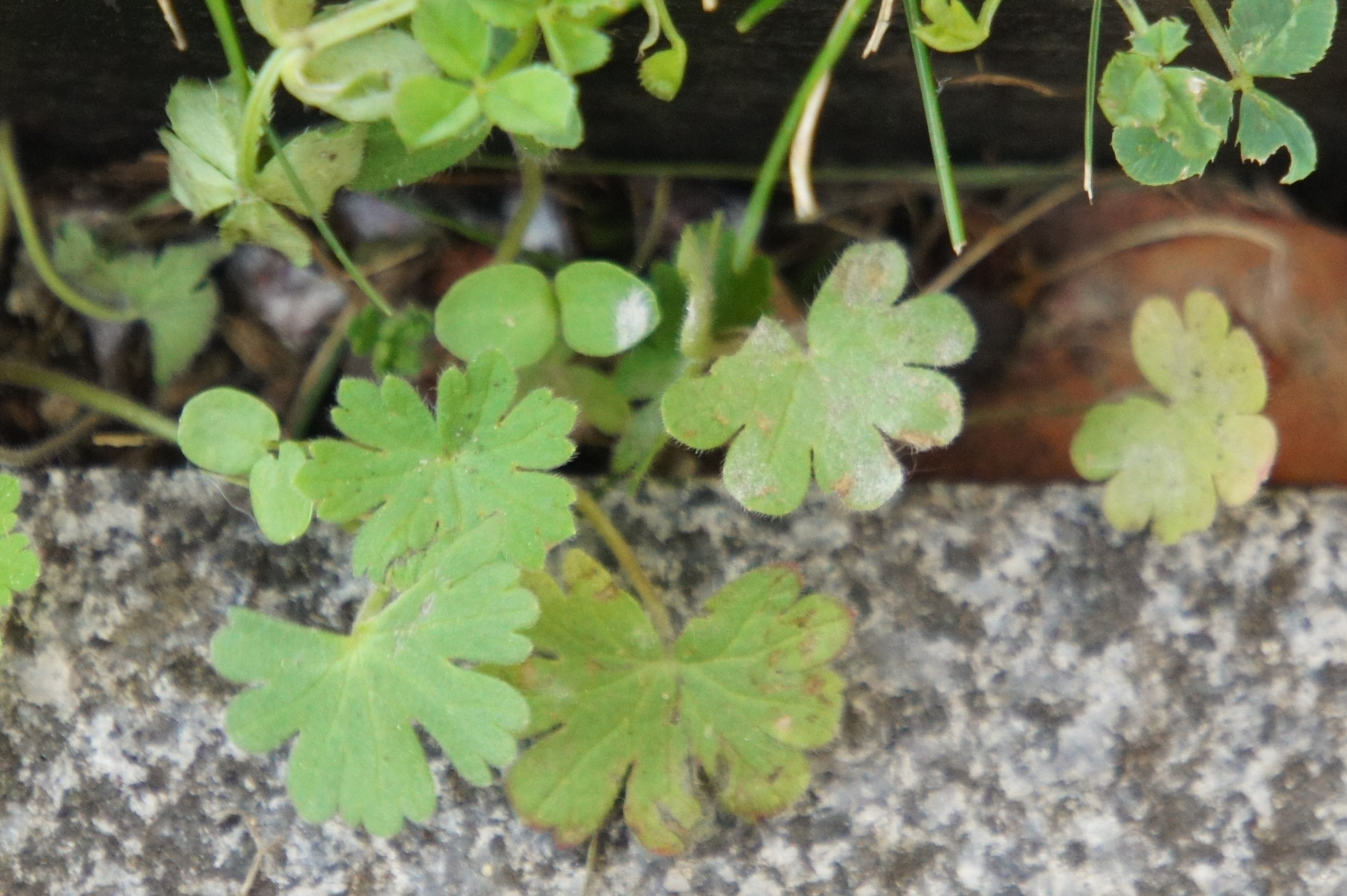

Scientific classification
- Kingdom: Fungi
- Division: Ascomycota
- Class: Leotiomycetes
- Order: Erysiphales
- Family: Erysiphaceae
- Genus: Podosphaera
- Species: P. fugax

Binomial name
- Podosphaera fugax (Penz. & Sacc.) U. Braun & S. Takam., 2000

Synonyms
- Sphaerotheca fugax Penz. & Sacc., 1884; Albigo fugax (Penz. & Sacc.) Kuntze, 1898; Erysiphe communis var. geranii Klotzsch, 1832

= Podosphaera fugax =

Species of fungus

Podosphaera fugax is a species of powdery mildew in the family Erysiphaceae. It is found across the globe, where it affects plants in the genus Geranium.

== Description ==
The fungus forms dense patches, primarily on stems, flowers, and fruits, with small white spots on leaves, eventually turning brown. Podosphaera fugax, like most Erysiphaceae, is highly host-specific and infects only plants in the genus Geranium. There are other species also affecting Geranium, including Neoerysiphe geranii and Erysiphe geraniacearum, which is generally considered to mostly affect smaller geraniums such as G. robertianum. Microscopy is often necessary to determine infections on Geranium to species-level.

== Taxonomy ==
The fungus was formally described in 1884 by Penzig and Saccardo with the basionym Sphaerotheca fugax. The species was transferred to the genus Podosphaera by Uwe Braun and Susumu Takamatsu in 2000.
