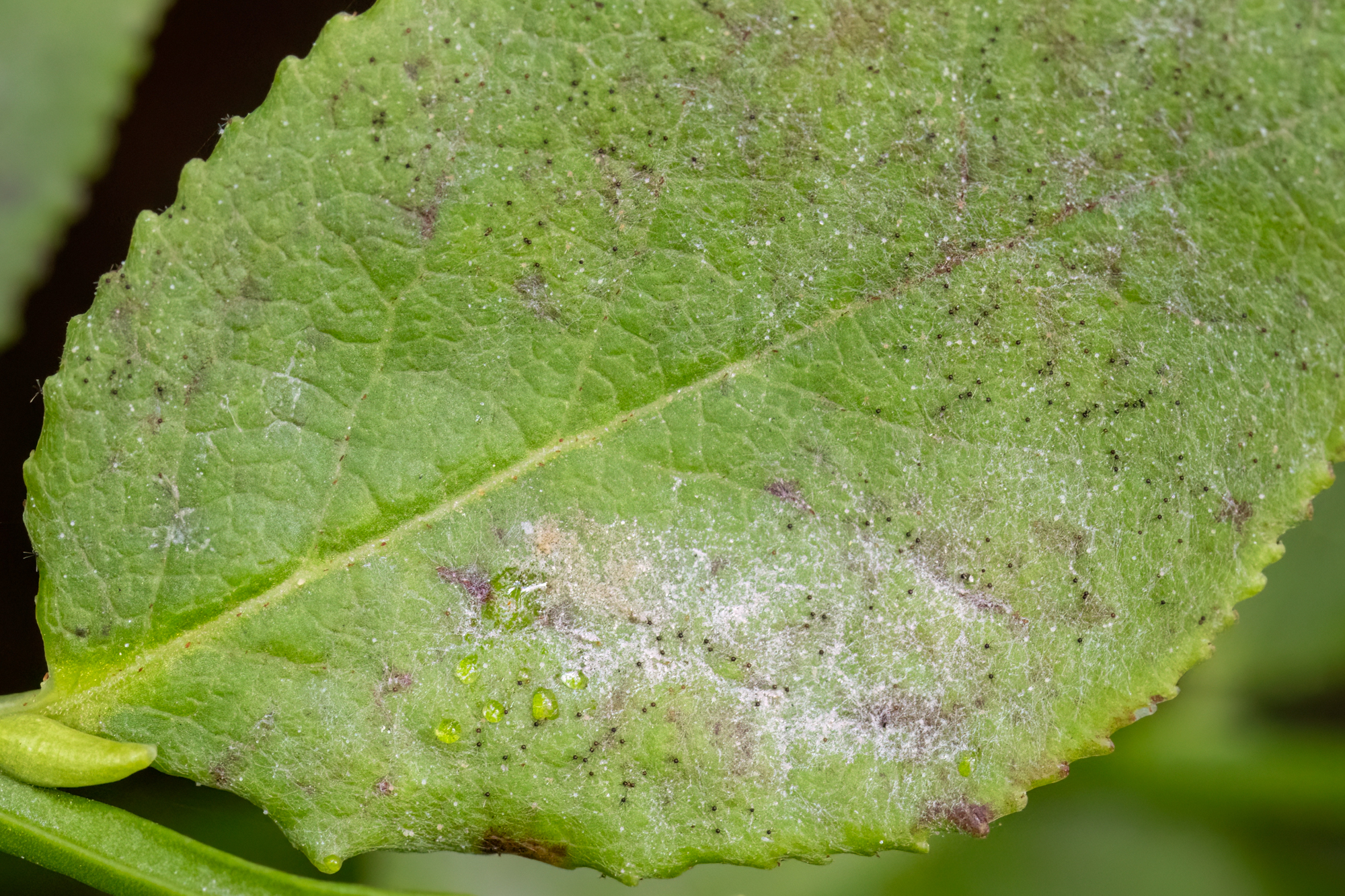
- Podosphaera myrtillina on Vaccinium in Finland.

Scientific classification
- Kingdom: Fungi
- Division: Ascomycota
- Class: Leotiomycetes
- Order: Helotiales
- Family: Erysiphaceae
- Genus: Podosphaera
- Species: P. myrtillina

Binomial name
- Podosphaera myrtillina (C. Schub.) Kunze, 1823

Synonyms
- Sphaeria myrtillina C. Schub, 1823; Erysiphe myrtillina (C. Schub) Fr., 1829; Podosphaera kunzei f. myrtillina (C. Schub) Rabenh., 1863; Podosphaera myrtilli Dufrenoy, 1919; Podosphaera major (Juel) S. Bumer, 1933

= Podosphaera myrtillina =

Species of fungus

Podosphaera myrtillina is a species of powdery mildew in the family Erysiphaceae. It is found in North America and Eurasia, where it affects plants in the genus Vaccinium.

== Description ==
The fungus forms effuse, thin, evanescent mycelium on host leaves, which usually change colour. Podosphaera myrtillina, like most Erysiphaceae, is highly host-specific and infects only Vaccinium. Podosphaera myrtillina is confined to smaller species of Vaccinium, while Erysiphe vaccinii is generally found on larger species.

== Taxonomy ==
The fungus was formally described in 1823 by C. Schubert with the basionym Sphaeria myrtillina. It was transferred to the genus Podosphaera later that year by Kunze. The species comprises two varieties: var. myrtillina and var. major. The latter has longer, more flexuose chasmothecial appendages than the former. The chasmothecia of var. major are said to intertwine their appendages to form clusters which are dispersed by rain or wind.
