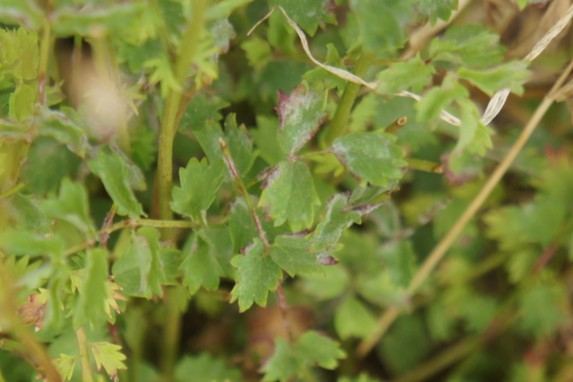

Scientific classification
- Kingdom: Fungi
- Division: Ascomycota
- Class: Leotiomycetes
- Order: Helotiales
- Family: Erysiphaceae
- Genus: Podosphaera
- Species: P. ferruginea

Binomial name
- Podosphaera ferruginea (Schltdl.) U. Braun & S. Takam., 2000

Synonyms
- Alphitomorpha ferruginea Schltdl., 1819; Erysiphe ferruginea (Schltdl.) Link, 1824; Sphaerotheca ferruginea (Schltdl.) L. Junell, 1965

= Podosphaera ferruginea =

Species of fungus

Podosphaera ferruginea is a species of powdery mildew in the family Erysiphaceae. It is found across Eurasia and North America, where it affects burnets (genus Sanguisorba).

== Description ==
The fungus forms thin, white irregular patches on the leaves of its host. P. ferruginea, like most Erysiphaceae, is highly host-specific and infects only the genus Sanguisorba.

== Taxonomy ==
The fungus was formally described in 1819 by Schlechtendal with the basionym Alphitomorpha ferruginea. The taxon was transferred to the genus Podosphaera by Uwe Braun and Susumu Takamatsu in 2000.
