= Bupirimate =

Names
- Preferred IUPAC name 5-Butyl-2-(ethylamino)-6-methylpyrimidin-4-yl dimethylsulfamate
- Other names Nimrod, Roseclear 2

Identifiers
CAS Number	41483-43-6
3D model (JSmol)	Interactive image
ChEBI	CHEBI:81952
ChemSpider	35588
ECHA InfoCard	100.050.339
EC Number	255-391-2
PubChem CID	38884
UNII	MCJ121RIOI
CompTox Dashboard (EPA)	DTXSID6041688
- InChI: InChI=1S/C13H24N4O3S/c1-6-8-9-11-10(3)15-13(14-7-2)16-12(11)20-21(18,19)17(4)5/h6-9H2,1-5H3,(H,14,15,16) Key: DSKJPMWIHSOYEA-UHFFFAOYSA-N; InChI=1/C13H24N4O3S/c1-6-8-9-11-10(3)15-13(14-7-2)16-12(11)20-21(18,19)17(4)5/h6-9H2,1-5H3,(H,14,15,16) Key: DSKJPMWIHSOYEA-UHFFFAOYAP
- SMILES: CCCCC1=C(N=C(N=C1OS(=O)(=O)N(C)C)NCC)C

Properties
Chemical formula	C_{13}H_{24}N_{4}O_{3}S
Molar mass	316.42 g·mol^{−1}
- Except where otherwise noted, data are given for materials in their standard state (at 25 °C [77 °F], 100 kPa). Infobox references

Bupirimate (systematic name 5-butyl-2-ethylamino-6-methylpyrimidin-4-yldimethylsulphamate; brand names Nimrod and Roseclear 2) is an active ingredient of plant protection products (or pesticides), which has an effect as a fungicide. It belongs to the chemical family of pyrimidine sulfamates. Bupirimate has translaminar mobility and systemic translocation in the xylem. It acts mainly by inhibiting sporulation and is used for control of powdery mildew of apples, pears, stone fruit, cucurbits, roses and other ornamentals, strawberries, gooseberries, currants, raspberries, hops, beets and other crops. Bupirimate is not an insecticide. It is of low mammalian toxicity and is non-toxic to bees. However, it is used in many products which also contain insecticides.

== History ==
A research programme at ICI's Jealott's Hill site during the 1960s had the objective of discovering fungicides which could penetrate into and move within plants and hence could cure established infections. The outcome of the research was three related compounds: dimethirimol, ethirimol and bupirimate which were first marketed in 1968, 1970 and 1975 respectively. The key target for these fungicides are the mildews but each compound differs in its effect on individual mildew species. In particular, bupirimate is effective on apple powdery mildew caused by the fungus Podosphaera leucotricha, which the earlier materials were not.

== Regulation ==
In terms of the regulation of plant protection products in the European Union, this active substance is in revision of the inclusion in Annex I of the 91/414/EEC Directive. In France, the active substance is permitted in the composition of preparations with an authorization on the market.
