= Sorus =

Cluster of sporangia in ferns and fungi

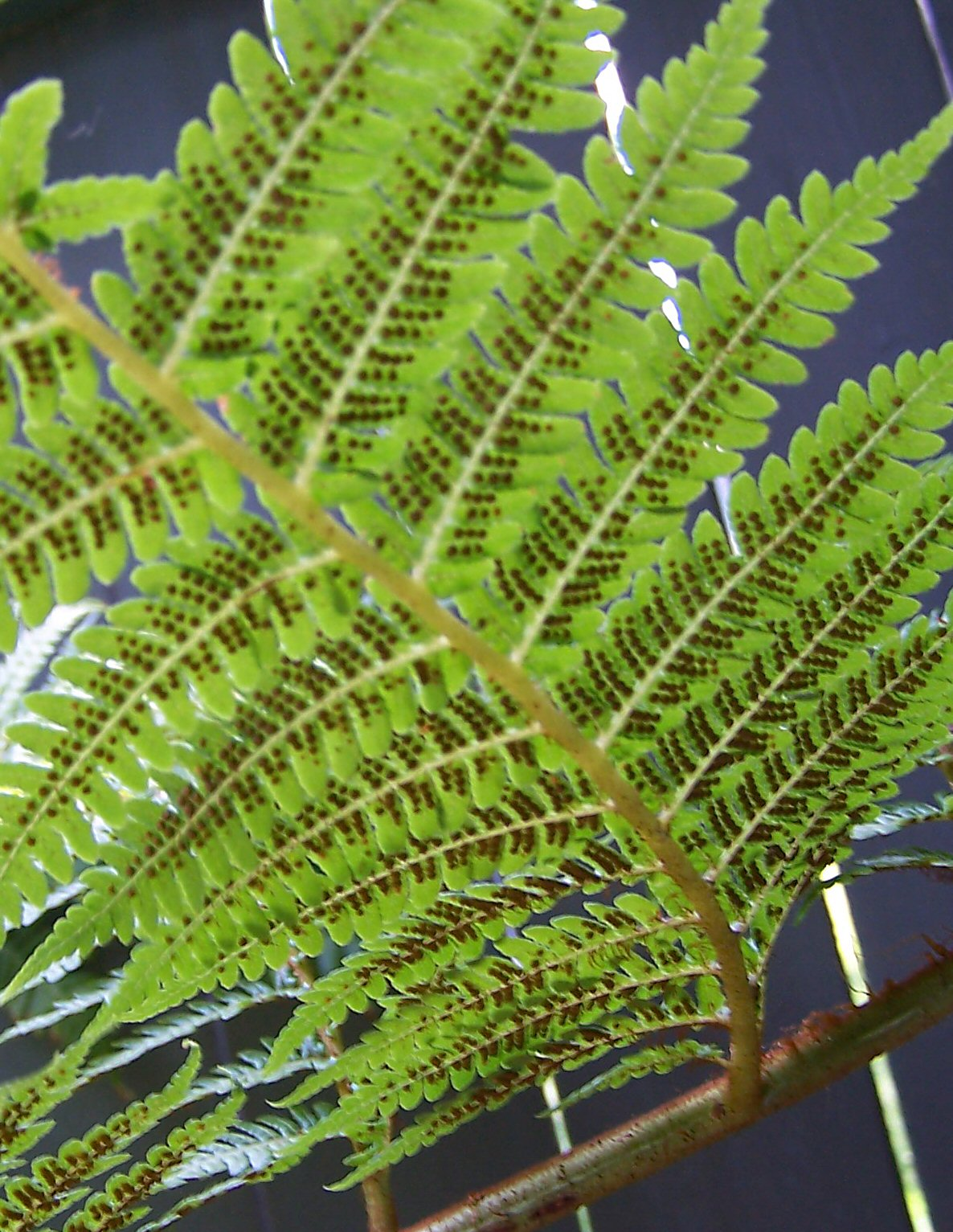
The underside of a fertile frond of Dicksonia antarctica. Each circular brown structure is an individual sorus.

A sorus (pl.: sori) is a cluster of sporangia (structures producing and containing spores) in ferns and fungi. A coenosorus (pl.: coenosori) is a compound sorus composed of multiple, fused sori.

== Etymology ==
This Neo-Latin word comes from the Ancient Greek word σωρός (sōrós), meaning "stack, pile, heap, etc.".

== Structure ==
In lichens and other fungi, the sorus is surrounded by an external layer. In some red algae, it may take the form of depression into the thallus.

In ferns, the sori form a yellowish or brownish mass on the edge or underside of a fertile frond. In some species, they are protected during development by a scale or film of tissue called the indusium (pl.: indusia), which forms an umbrella-like cover.

== Life cycle significance ==
Sori occur on the sporophyte generation, the sporangia within producing haploid meiospores. As the sporangia mature, the indusium shrivels so that spore release is unimpeded. The sporangia then burst and release the spores.

== As an aid to identification ==
The shape, arrangement, and location of the sori are often valuable clues in the identification of fern taxa. Sori may be circular or linear. They may be arranged in rows, either parallel or oblique to the costa, or randomly. Their location may be marginal or set away from the margin on the frond lamina. The presence or absence of indusium is also used to identify fern taxa.

== Gallery ==
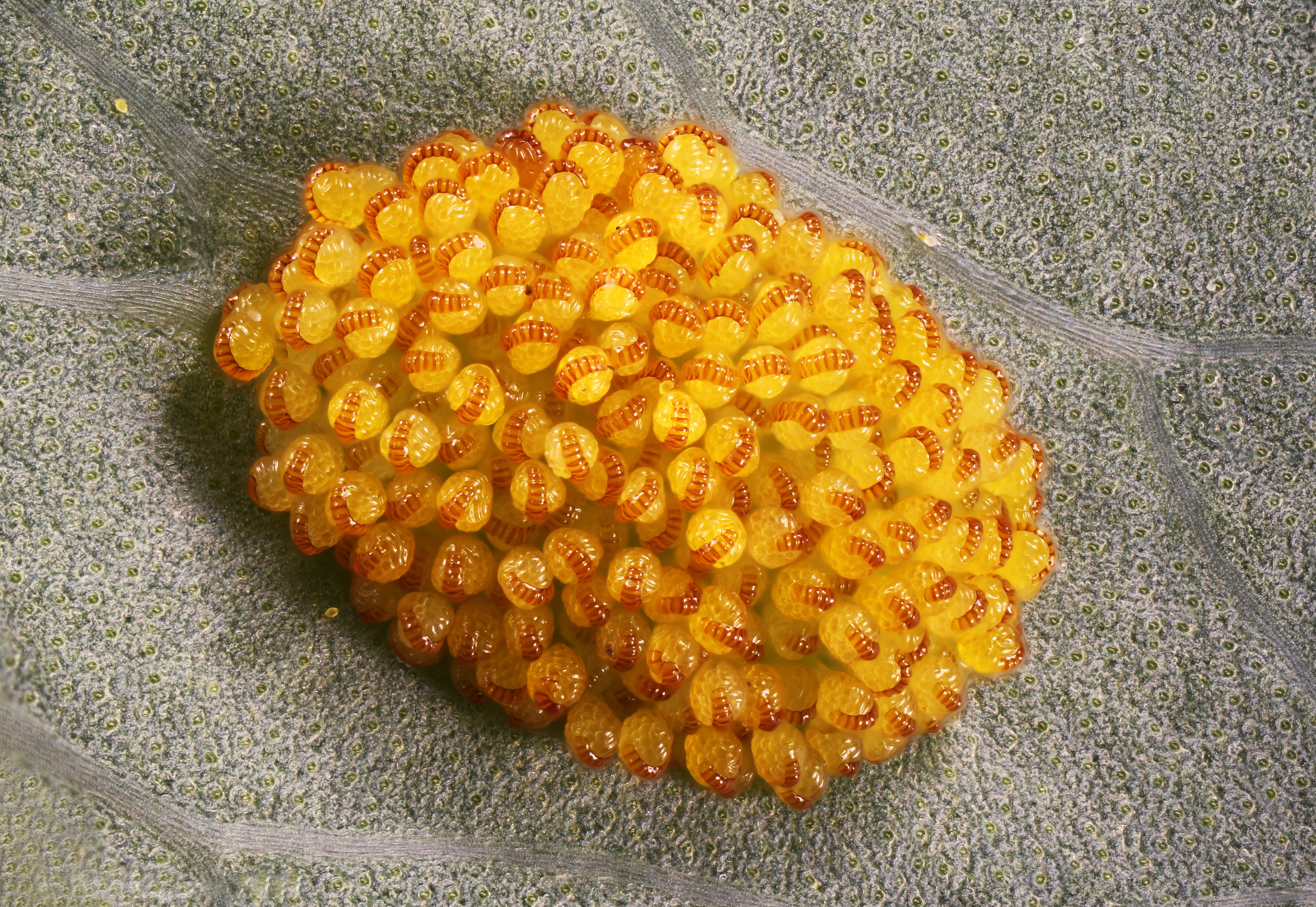
Sorus of Phlebodium aureum

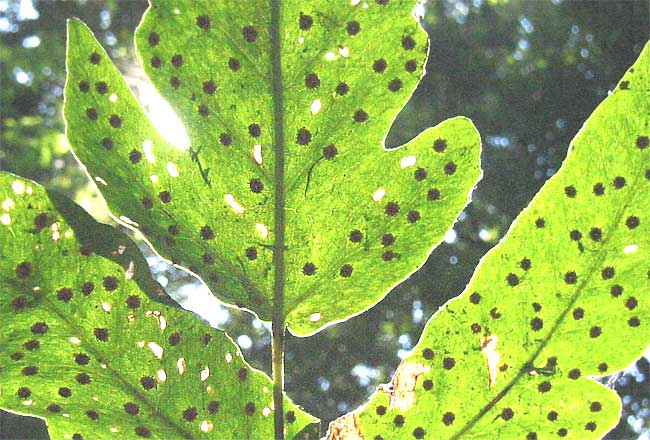
Scattered sori

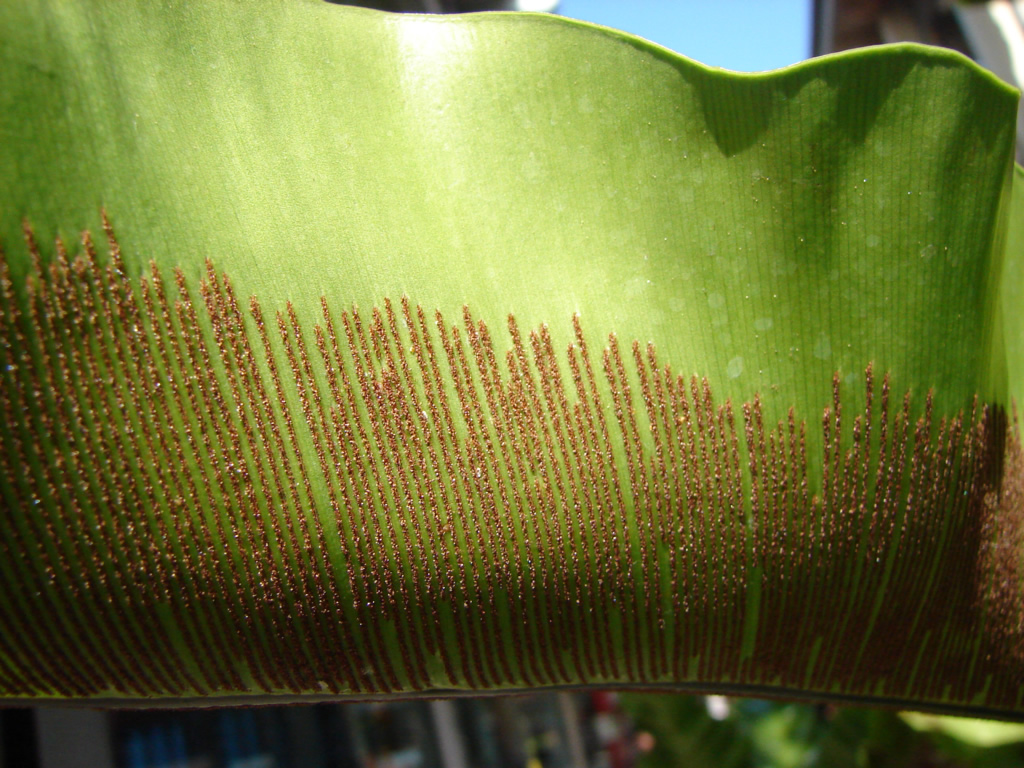
Linear sori

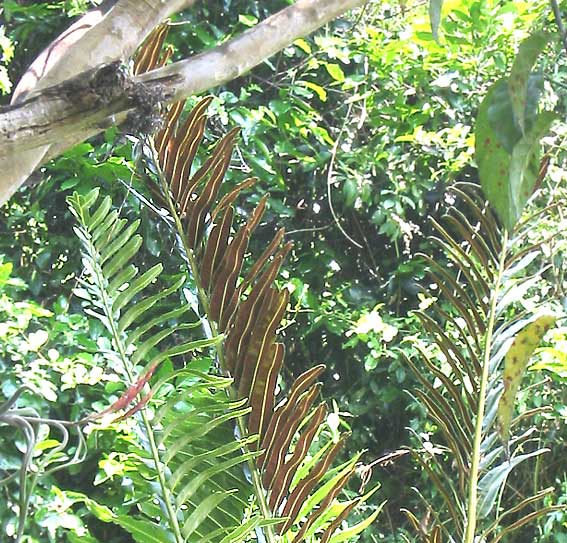
Sori covering a frond's entire underside (acrostichoid)

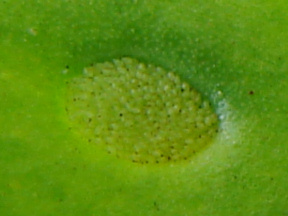
Fern sorus with immature sporangia

Circular sori with mature sporangia

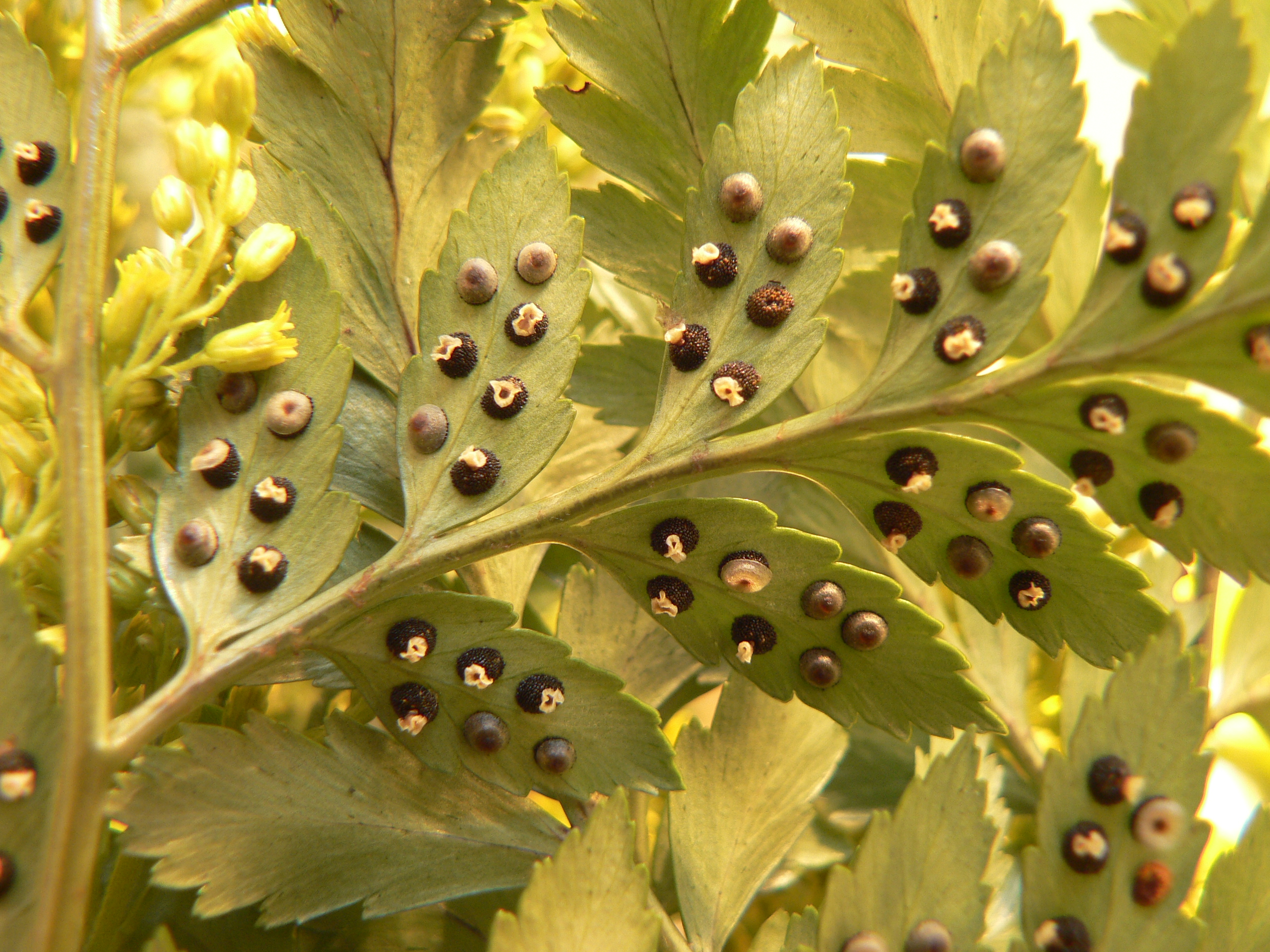
Sori with indusia at different stages of development.

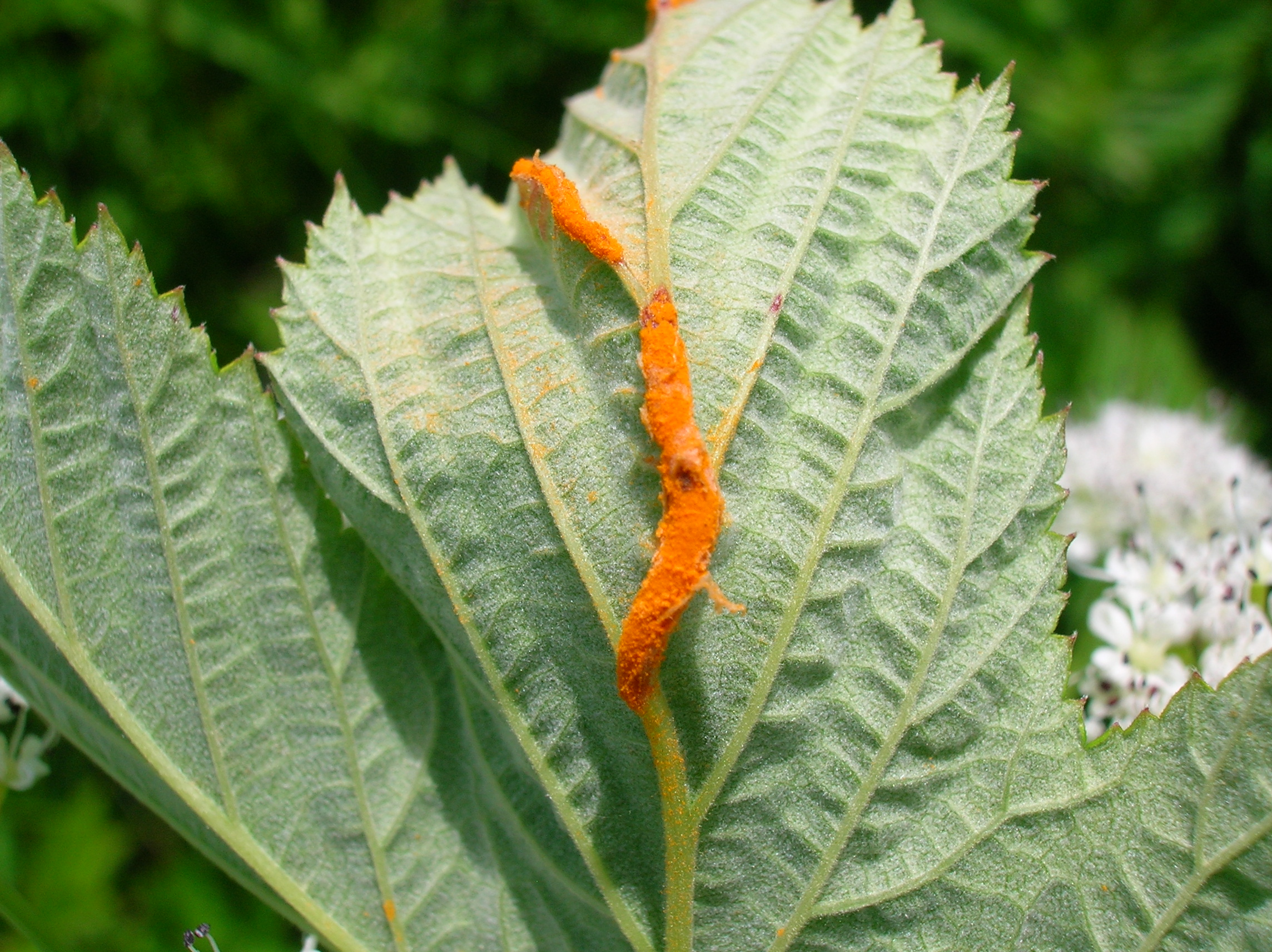
Fungal sori of the meadowsweet rust gall.

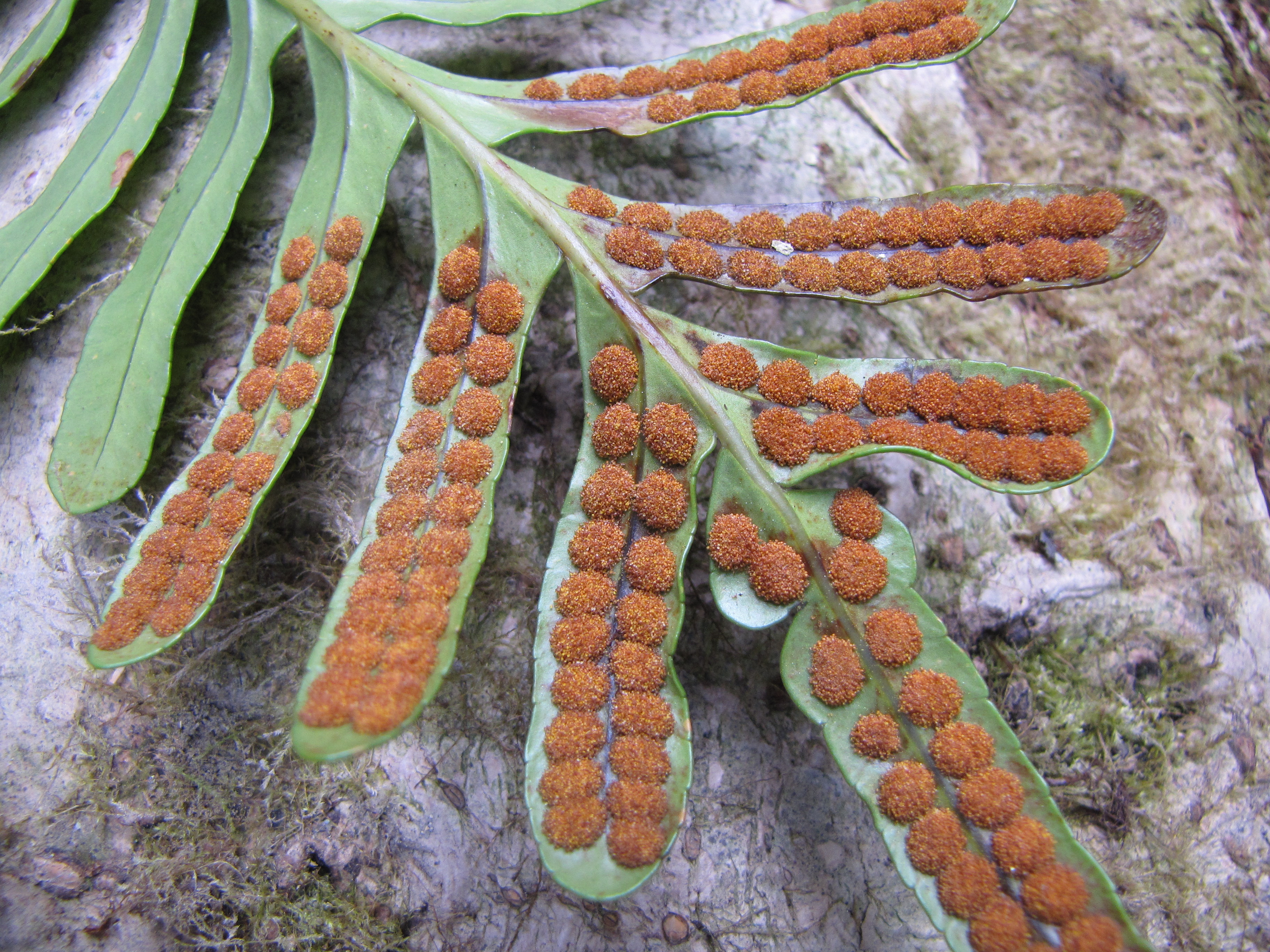
Large sori

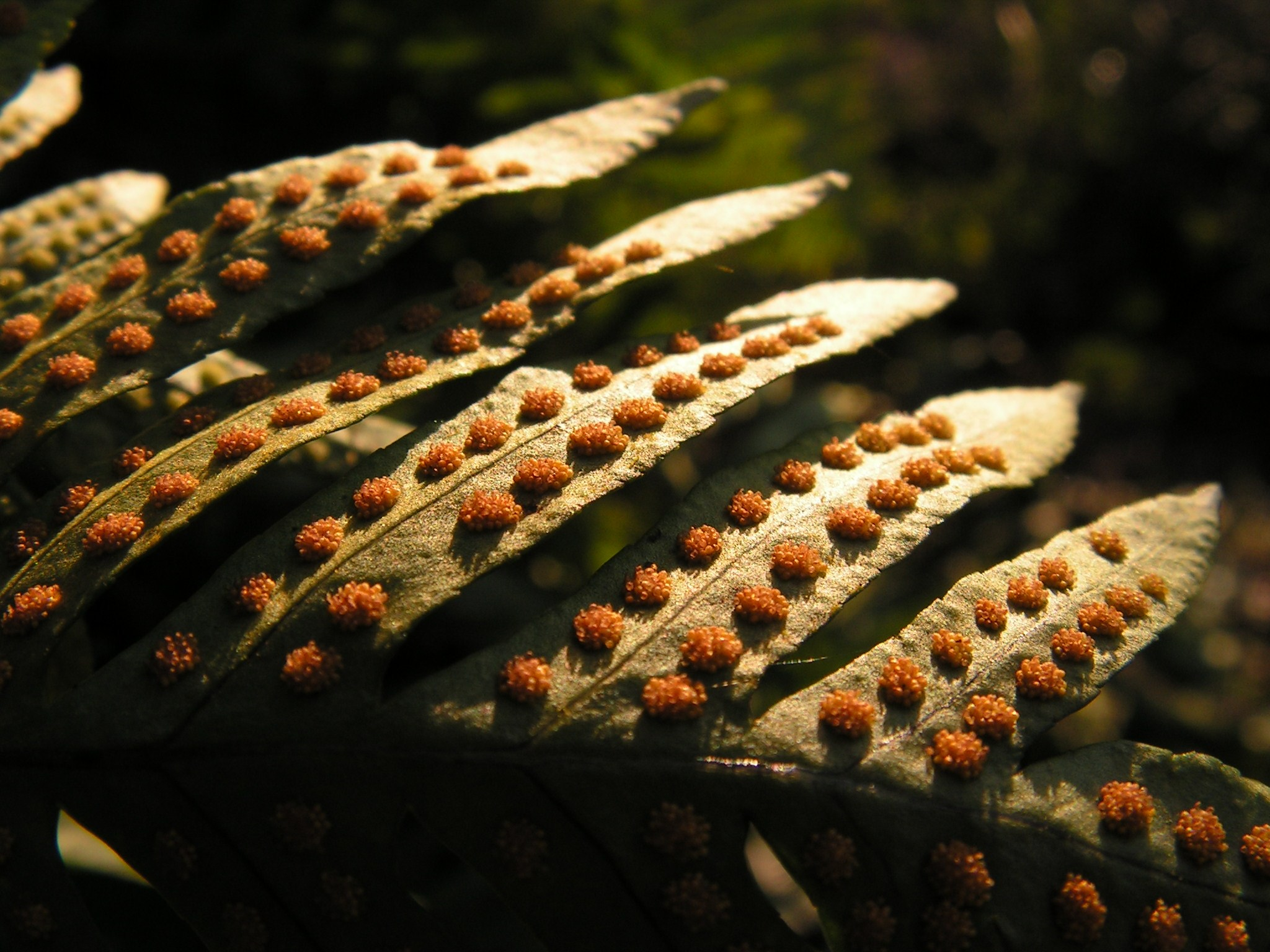
Polypodium vulgare

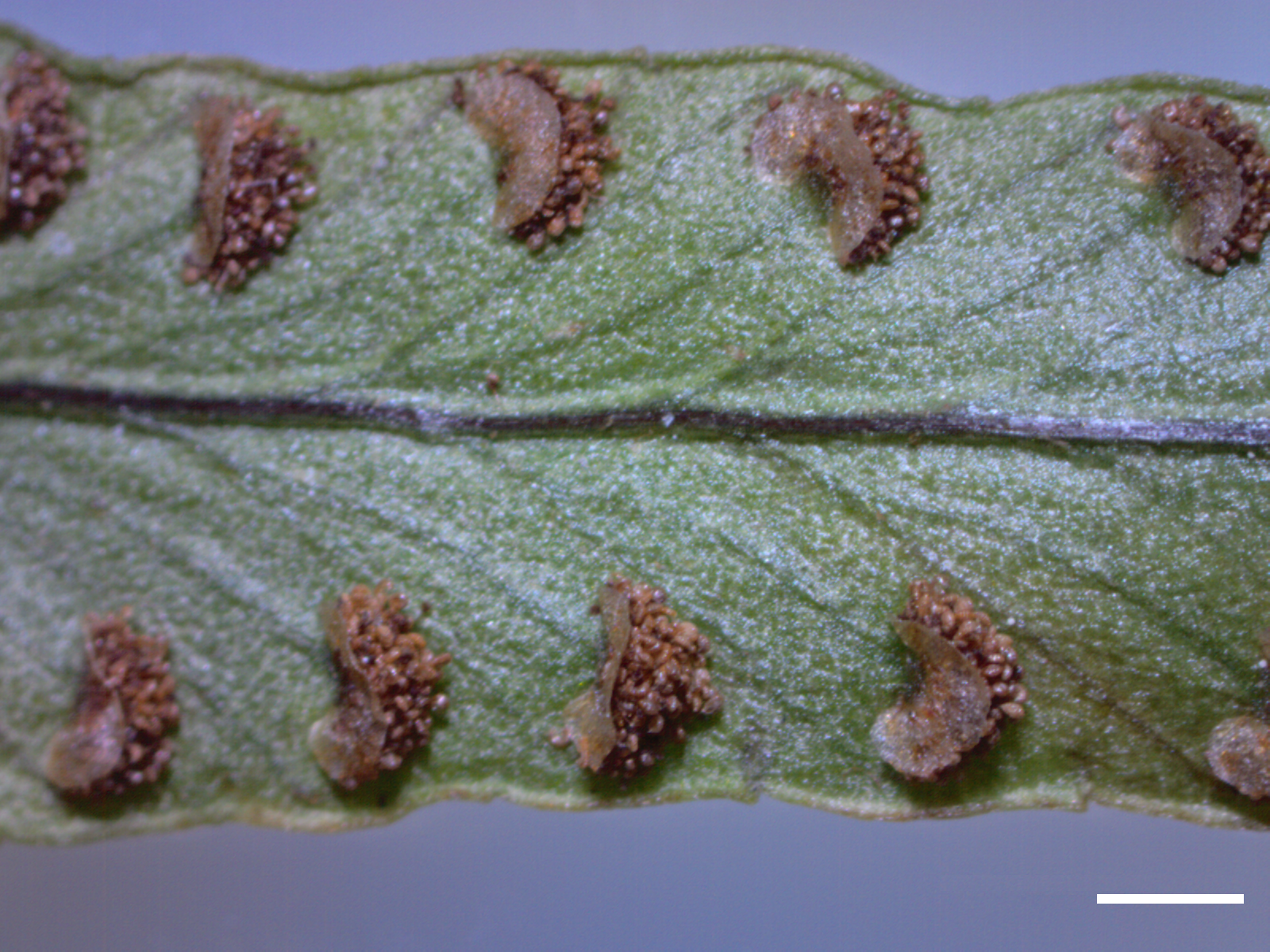
Sword fern. The indusia have opened, revealing the sporangia. Scale bar, 1 mm

== See also ==
- Sorocarp

== References and external links ==
- DiversityOfLife – Fern identification tool.
- Encyclopædia Britannica: sorus 2007. Encyclopædia Britannica Online. Retrieved 20 November 2007.
