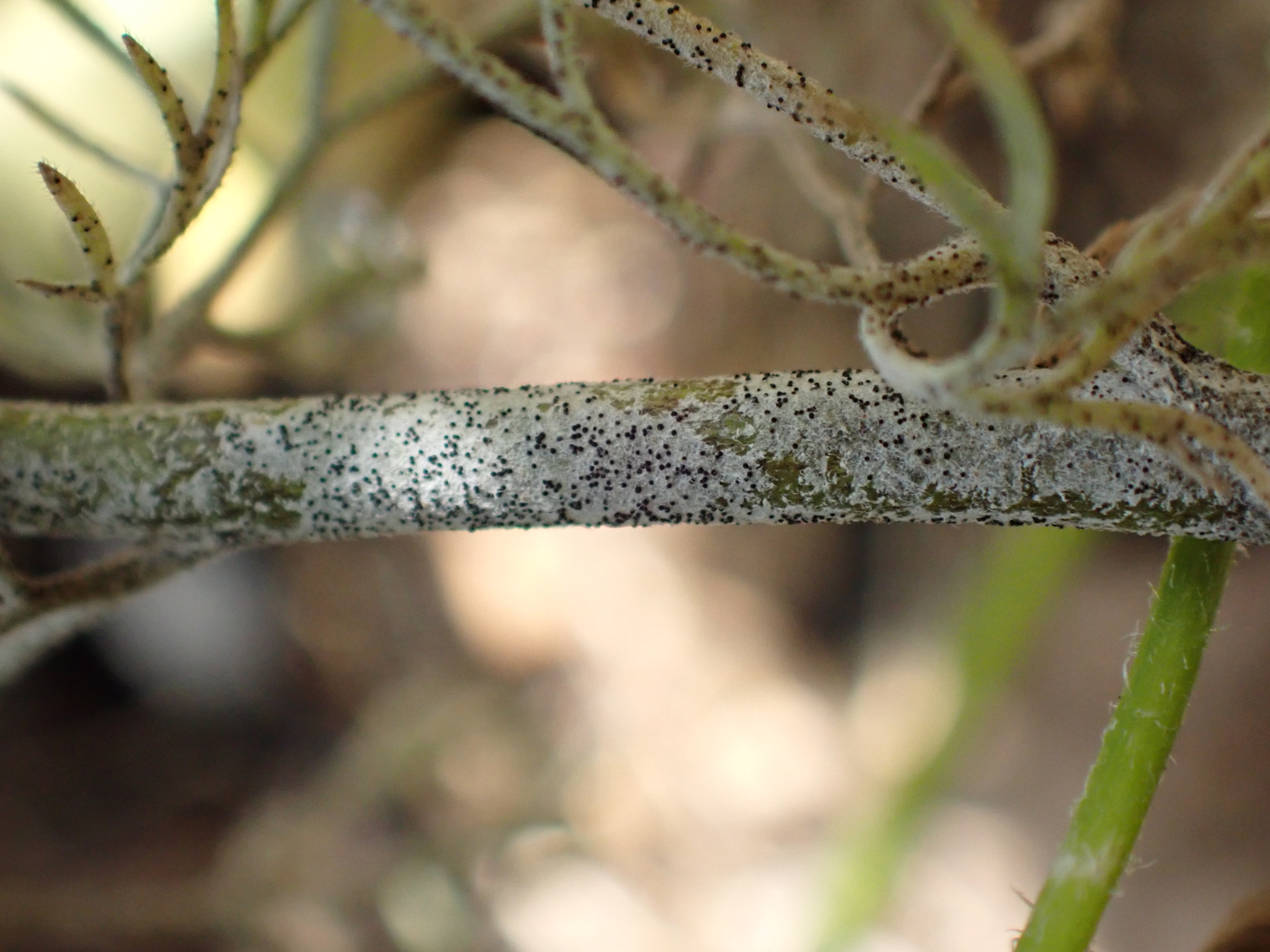
- Podosphaera delphinii on Delphinium ajacis

Scientific classification
- Kingdom: Fungi
- Division: Ascomycota
- Class: Leotiomycetes
- Order: Helotiales
- Family: Erysiphaceae
- Genus: Podosphaera
- Species: P. delphinii

Binomial name
- Podosphaera delphinii (P. Karst.) U. Braun & S. Takam., 2000

Synonyms
- Sphaerotheca castagnei subsp. delphinii P. Karst., 1904; Sphaerotheca delphinii (P. Karst.) S. Blumer, 1933; Sphaerotheca fuliginea f. delphinii (P. Karst.) Jacz., 1927

= Podosphaera delphinii =

Species of fungus

Podosphaera delphinii is a species of powdery mildew in the family Erysiphaceae. It is found in North America and Eurasia, where it infects plants in the genera Adonis, Delphinium and Trollius.

== Description ==
The fungus forms white, often thick, mycelium on the leaves and stems of its hosts. As with most Erysiphaceae, Podosphaera delphinii is strongly host-specific, infecting only plants in two tribes, Adonideae and Delphinieae. Podosphaera delphinii can be found in any habitats where its host species occur, including urban and suburban gardens and parks. Erysiphe nitida also occurs on plants in the Delphinieae.

== Taxonomy ==
Podosphaera delphinii was first described by Karsten in 1904 with the basionym Sphaerotheca castagnei subsp. delphinii. Blumer raised this to specific rank before it was transferred to the genus Podosphaera in 2000. The type specimen was collected in Russia on Delphinium grandiflorum. The specific epithet derives from the type host genus.

== Micromorphology ==
=== Description ===
The mycelium is common on both stems and leaves. The hyphal appressoria are nipple-shaped but frequently rather indistinct. Straight conidiophores arise from the upper surface of superficial hyphae and produce catanescent conidia. Conidia are ellipsoid-ovoid to barrel-shaped. The chasmothecia (fruiting bodies) are often very gregarious. Appendages are found in the lower half and are few and simple, pigmented brown when mature. The peridium of the chasmothecia has rather large cells of irregular shape. Podosphaera epilobii has six to eight colourless spores per ascus. The asci are ellipsoid-ovoid and sessile or almost sessile.

=== Measurements ===
Hyphal cells are 4–7 μm wide. Conidiophores measure 30–80 × 8–13 μm. Conidia are 18–35 × 10–15 μm. The chasmothecia are 65–90 μm in diameter with peridium cells 15–40 μm in diameter. Appendages are 1–4(–6)× the diameter of the chasmothecia and (3–)4.5–10.5 μm wide. Asci are 60–80 × 45–65 μm with ascospores measuring 19–31 × 13–18 μm.
