= Podosphaera cercidiphylli =

Scientific classification
- Kingdom: Fungi
- Division: Ascomycota
- Class: Leotiomycetes
- Order: Helotiales
- Family: Erysiphaceae
- Genus: Podosphaera
- Species: P. cercidiphylli

Binomial name
- Podosphaera cercidiphylli Tanda & Y. Nomura, 1986

Species of fungus

Podosphaera cercidiphylli is a species of powdery mildew in the family Erysiphaceae. It is found in East Asia, where it infects plants in the genus Cercidiphyllum.

== Description ==
The fungus forms thin, white irregular patches on the leaves of its host. Podosphaera cercidiphylli, like most Erysiphaceae, is highly host-specific and infects only the genus Cercidiphyllum.

== Taxonomy ==
The fungus was formally described in 1986 by Tanda and Y. Nomura. The specific epithet derives from the name of the host genus.
