= Podosphaera fusca =

Scientific classification
- Kingdom: Fungi
- Division: Ascomycota
- Class: Leotiomycetes
- Order: Helotiales
- Family: Erysiphaceae
- Genus: Podosphaera
- Species: P. fusca

Binomial name
- Podosphaera fusca (Fr.) U. Braun & Shishkoff, (2000)

Synonyms
- Erysiphe fusca Fr., 1829; Sphaerotheca fusca (Fr.) S. Blumer, 1933; Sphaerotheca codonopsis Z.Y. Zhao, 1979; Erysiphe doronici Duby, 1830

Species of fungus

Podosphaera fusca is a fungus that parasitically infects plants (a phytopathogen). It is the cause of powdery mildew in the genus Doronicum.

P. fusca was formerly considered synonymous with Podosphaera xanthii, but due to, mainly, the smaller ascomata and smaller oculi than P. xanthii, it was deemed a separate species. While P. xanthii remains a large species complex (with P. xanthii s.s. on Xanthium), P. fusca is now very narrowly defined.
