= Podosphaera salatai =

Scientific classification
- Kingdom: Fungi
- Division: Ascomycota
- Class: Leotiomycetes
- Order: Helotiales
- Family: Erysiphaceae
- Genus: Podosphaera
- Species: P. salatai

Binomial name
- Podosphaera salatai Heluta, U. Braun & Gvrit., 2005

Species of fungus

Podosphaera salatai is a species of powdery mildew in the family Erysiphaceae. It is found in the Caucasus region, where it affects the species Prunus incana.

== Description ==
The fungus forms white patches of mycelium on host leaves. It most often infects the leaf undersides and is often hidden by the leaf trichomes. Podosphaera salatai, like most Erysiphaceae, is highly host-specific and infects only one species of Prunus. There are a great many other species of powdery mildew on other species of Prunus.

== Taxonomy ==
Podosphaera salatai was described by V.P. Heluta, Uwe Braun and Gvritischvili in 2005 based on collections from Georgia.
