= Podosphaera xanthii =

Scientific classification
- Kingdom: Fungi
- Division: Ascomycota
- Class: Leotiomycetes
- Order: Helotiales
- Family: Erysiphaceae
- Genus: Podosphaera
- Species: P. xanthii

Binomial name
- Podosphaera xanthii (Castagne) U. Braun & Shishkoff, 2000

Species of fungus

Podosphaera xanthii is a species complex of fungal plant pathogens that causes powdery mildew disease of a range of different host species. The primary symptoms are white, powder-like spots on the leaves and stems. P. xanthii sensu stricto affects plants in the genus Xanthium (cocklebur).

== Description ==
The fungus appears as white patches of mycelium on its host plant. Like most powdery mildews, Podosphaera xanthii is highly host-specific and is only found on a single genus of plants (Xanthium). However, the species was formerly very broadly defined, and was recorded as occurring on a vast array of hosts, including ones commonly planted in gardens such as Cucurbita. These records are not assigned to a strict species, and are said to belong to the Podosphaera xanthii complex, rather than the species sensu stricto.

== Taxonomy ==
The species was described in 1845 by Castagne with the basionym Erysiphe xanthii. The species was transferred to the genus Podosphaera in 2000 by Braun and Shishkoff. Some researchers formerly considered P. xanthii to be a synonym of Podosphaera fusca.
