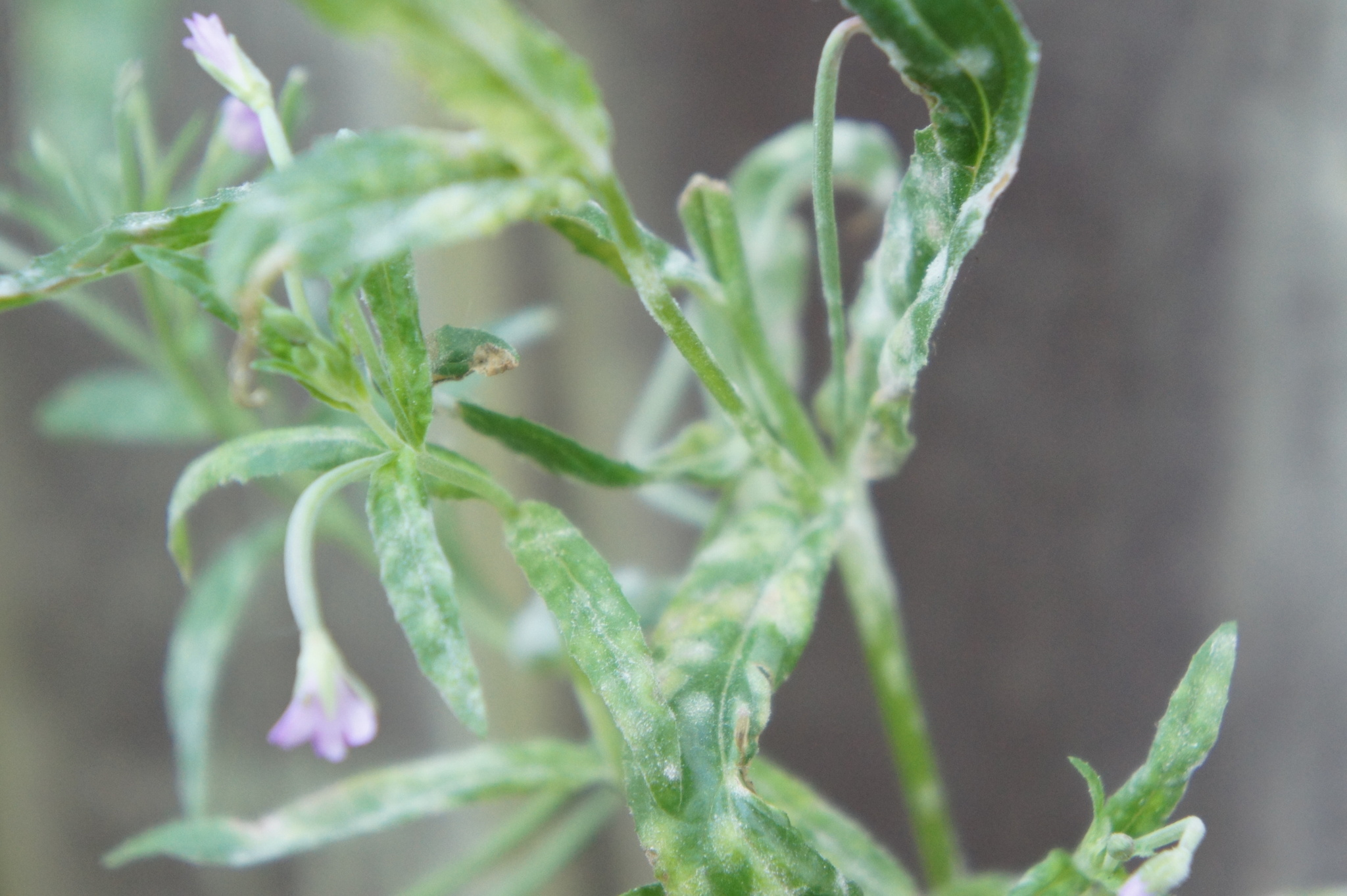
- Podosphaera epilobii on Epilobium in the UK

Scientific classification
- Kingdom: Fungi
- Division: Ascomycota
- Class: Leotiomycetes
- Order: Helotiales
- Family: Erysiphaceae
- Genus: Podosphaera
- Species: P. epilobii

Binomial name
- Podosphaera epilobii (Wallr.) de Bary, 1870

Synonyms
- Alphitomorpha epilobii Wallr., 1819; Alphitomorpha macularis var. epilobii Wallr., 1819; Erysiphe epilobii (Wallr.) Link, 1824; Sphaerotheca epilobii (Wallr.) de Bary, 1871; Desetangsia epilobii (Wallr.) Nieuwl., 1916; Albigo epilobii (Wallr.) Kuntze, 1898; Oidium epilobii (Corda) Lindau, 1907; Torula epilobii Corda, 1840; Oospora epilobii (Corda) Lindau, 1886

= Podosphaera epilobii =

Species of fungus

Podosphaera epilobii is a species of powdery mildew in the family Erysiphaceae. It is found in North America, Eurasia and New Zealand, where it infects plants in the genera Chamaenerion and Epilobium (willowherbs).

== Description ==
The fungus forms white, often thick, mycelium on the leaves of its hosts. It has also been reported as causing galls. As with most Erysiphaceae, Podosphaera epilobii is highly host-specific, infecting only plants in two genera (reported as one in older literature as Chamaenerion was formerly part of Epilobium). Podosphaera epilobii can be found in any habitats where its host species occur, including urban and suburban gardens and parks.

== Taxonomy ==
Podosphaera epilobii was first described by Wallroth in 1819 with the basionym Aphitomorpha epilobii. The type specimen was collected in France on Epilobium montanum. The specific epithet derives from the type host genus.

== Micromorphology ==
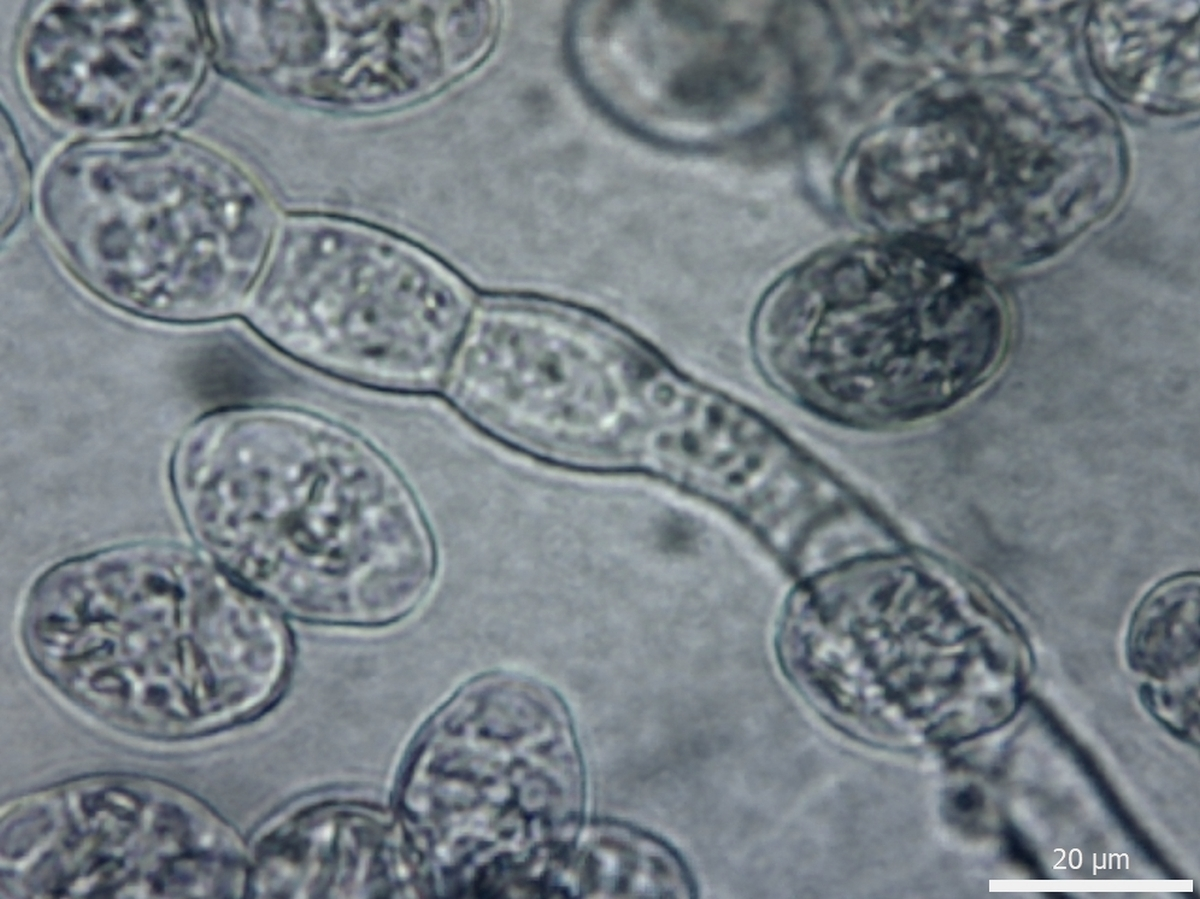
Chain conidia of Podosphaera epilobii as seen under the microscope

=== Description ===
The mycelium is amphigenous (found on both sides of the leaf) and can be dense and patchy or more effuse. It often turns brown with age. The hyphal appressoria are nipple-shaped but frequently rather indistinct. Straight conidiophores arise from the upper surface of superficial hyphae. They have long foot cells that are straight with a basal septum not elevated. The conidiophores produce catanescent conidia. Conidia are ellipsoid to doliiform. The chasmothecia (fruiting bodies) are common especially on stems, where they can be very gregarious. They have rather long appendages typically in the lower half. The peridium of the chasmothecia has rather large cells of irregular shape. Podosphaera epilobii has eight spores per ascus which are colourless. The asci are ellipsoid and sessile.

=== Measurements ===
Conidiophores are 30–80 μm long and 8–13 μm wide. Conidia are 19–38 × 11–20 μm. The chasmothecia are 60–105 μm in diameter with peridium cells 10–30 μm in diameter. Appendages are 0.5–5× the diameter of the chasmothecia and (3.5–)4.5–10.5(–12) μm wide near the base. Asci are (50–)60–80(–100) × (40–)50–70 μm with ascospores measuring (15–)16–24(–26) × 9–16 μm.
