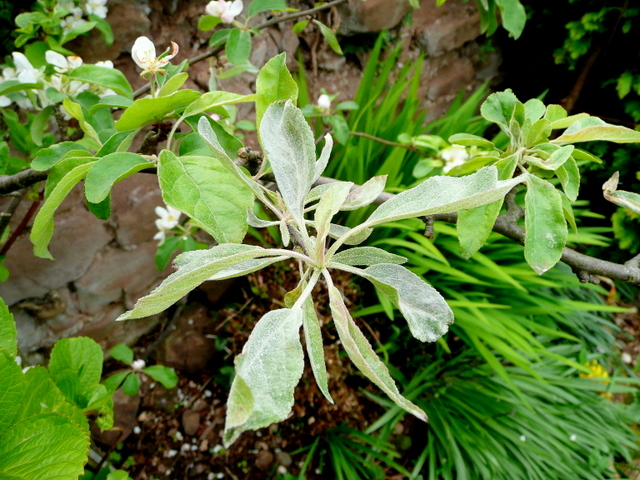
- Podosphaera leucotricha on Malus.

Scientific classification
- Kingdom: Fungi
- Division: Ascomycota
- Class: Leotiomycetes
- Order: Helotiales
- Family: Erysiphaceae
- Genus: Podosphaera
- Species: P. leucotricha

Binomial name
- Podosphaera leucotricha (Ellis & Everh.) E.S. Salmon, 1900

Synonyms
- Sphaerotheca leucotricha Ellis & Everh., 1888; Albigo leucotricha (Ellis & Everh.) Kuntze, 1892; Oidium farinosum Cooke, 1887

= Podosphaera leucotricha =

Species of fungus

Podosphaera leucotricha is a species of powdery mildew, a fungal plant pathogen, that infects species in the genera Malus (apples)and Pyrus (pears). It has an almost circumglobal distribution, being found on every continent bar Antarctica.

== Description ==
The fungus forms a white, thin to dense coating on leaves, shoots, fruits, stalks, flowers and buds. Podosphaera leucotricha is one of the most significant pathogens of cultivated apple throughout the world. The main hosts of P. leucotricha are Malus and Pyrus, although the species has been reported in the past (with varying degrees of likelihood) from various hosts including Cydonia, Photinia, Prunus and Spiraea. Infected plants are characterized by reduced photosynthesis and transpiration, resulting in reduced growth. Blossom may be deformed, and shoots stunted with leaves that fall faster.

== Disease cycle ==
Podosphaera leucotricha has a polycyclic disease cycle. Mycelium overwintering in dormant buds typically produces primary infection on young leaves. In spring, the overwintered fungus is evident as 'primary' mildew on leaves emerged from buds infected during the previous growing season. Conidia are released from the primary mildew and disperse through the air to initiate 'secondary' mildew on growing shoots. Young developing fruitlets may also be infected. Apple shoots have a long growing season causing the tree to stay susceptible for several months. Despite generally spreading almost exclusively asexually, the sexual state of P. leucotricha occurs as small chasmothecia among mycelium on infected shoots or leaves. Although the mycelium can overwinter in dormant buds, overwintering potential is limited primarily by temperature. In severe winters, infected buds are killed as they are more susceptible to the cold than healthy buds.

== Management ==
Commercial growers of apples and pears usually apply fungicides rigorously in order to control this powdery mildew species. In some countries, most commercial apple orchards receive routine sprays, as powdery mildew rarely disappears from an orchard entirely. Once primary mildew levels are high, effective control becomes difficult. Therefore, control strategies depend on maintaining primary mildew at a low level. Without using fungicides, mildew may be kept to a low level by pruning the trees. It is recommended to prune out silvered shoots in winter and at pink bud and petal fall stages, to prune out primary blossom and primary vegetative mildew. June is said to be a critical time for monitoring and mildew control as this is the period for rapid extension growth and also when fruit buds are forming and sealing for next spring. The development of apple varieties displaying durable resistance to Podosphaera leucotricha is one of the major aims of apple breeding programs worldwide, which also focus on genetic modification.

== Taxonomy ==
The fungus was formally described in 1888 by Ellis and Everhart with the basionym Sphaerotheca leucotricha. The species was transferred to the genus Podosphaera in 1900 by E.S. Salmon.
