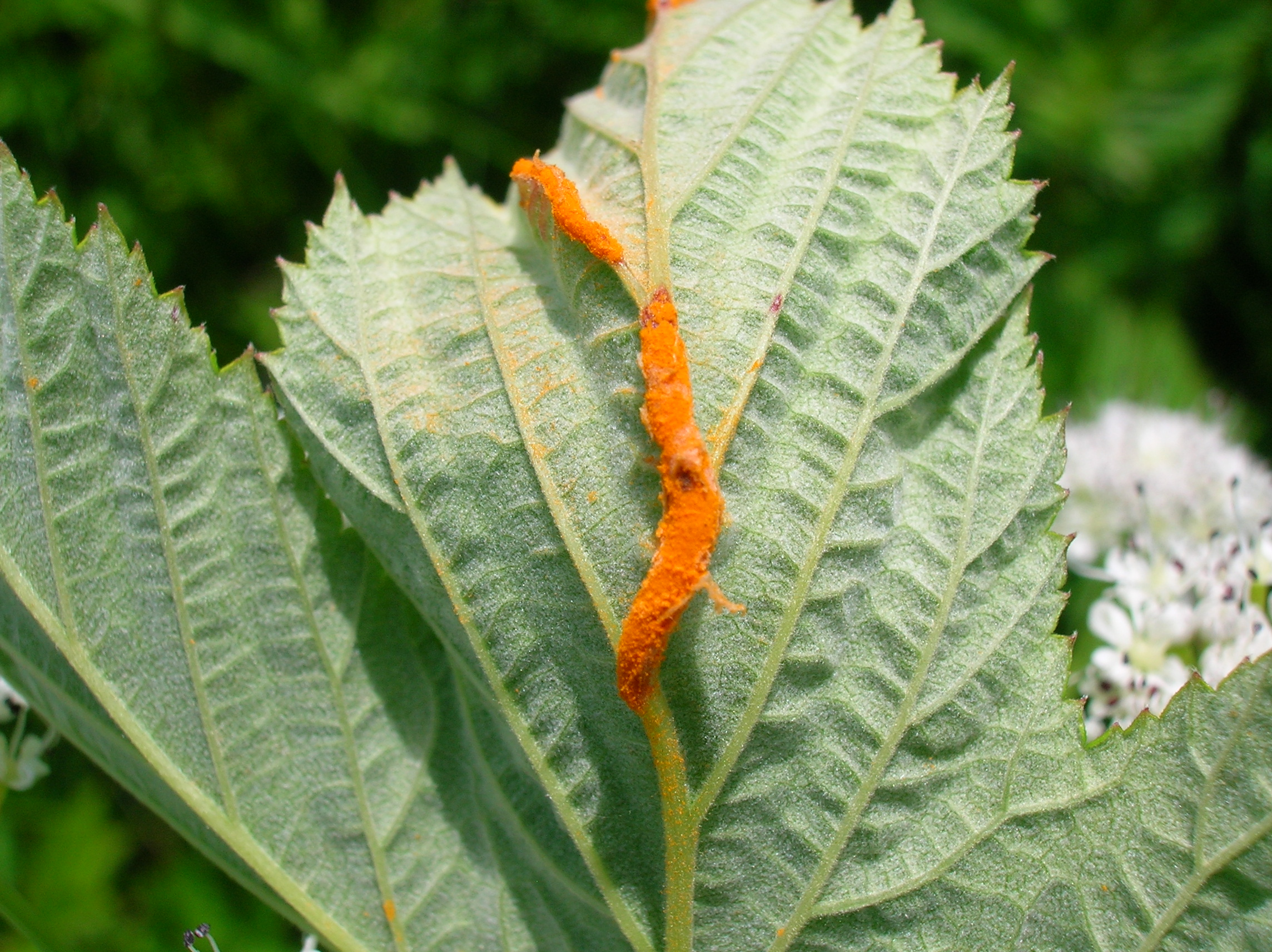
- Mature gall on a leaf of meadowsweet (Filipendula ulmaria)

Scientific classification
- Kingdom: Fungi
- Division: Basidiomycota
- Class: Pucciniomycetes
- Order: Pucciniales
- Family: Phragmidiaceae
- Genus: Triphragmium
- Species: T. ulmariae

Binomial name
- Triphragmium ulmariae (DC.) Link

Synonyms
- Puccinia ulmariae DC. (1808)

= Triphragmium ulmariae =

Species of fungus

Triphragmium ulmariae is a species of rust fungus in the family Phragmidiaceae. It causes meadowsweet rust gall, which develops as a chemically induced swelling, arising from the lower surface of the meadowsweet (Filipendula ulmaria) leaves.

== Life cycle ==
The fungus grows in the petioles and midribs of the perennial plant meadowsweet (Filipendula ulmaria), a member of the rose family, causing swelling and distortion. Sori develop with bright orange spores. The rust's spores reach the new meadowsweet plants via air movements.

The rust has a severe effect on the survival of meadowsweet seedlings.
