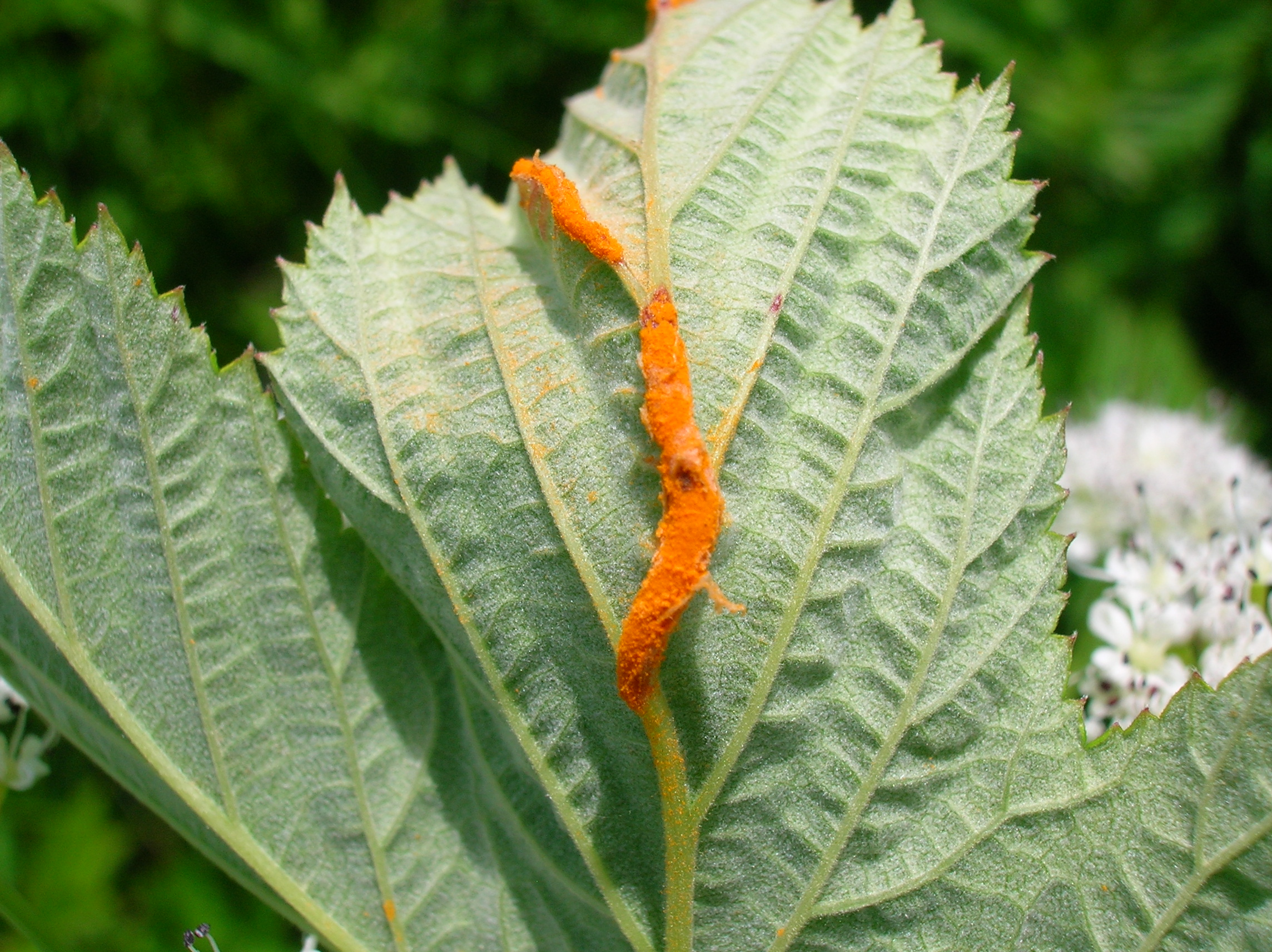
- Triphragmium ulmariae

Scientific classification
- Kingdom: Fungi
- Division: Basidiomycota
- Class: Pucciniomycetes
- Order: Pucciniales
- Family: Phragmidiaceae
- Genus: Triphragmium; Link

= Triphragmium =

Genus of fungi

Triphragmium is a genus of fungi belonging to the family Phragmidiaceae.

The genus was first described by Johann Heinrich Friedrich Link in 1825.

The species of this genus are found in Eurasia and Northern America.

Species:

- Triphragmium filipendulae (Lasch) Pass.
- Triphragmium ulmariae
