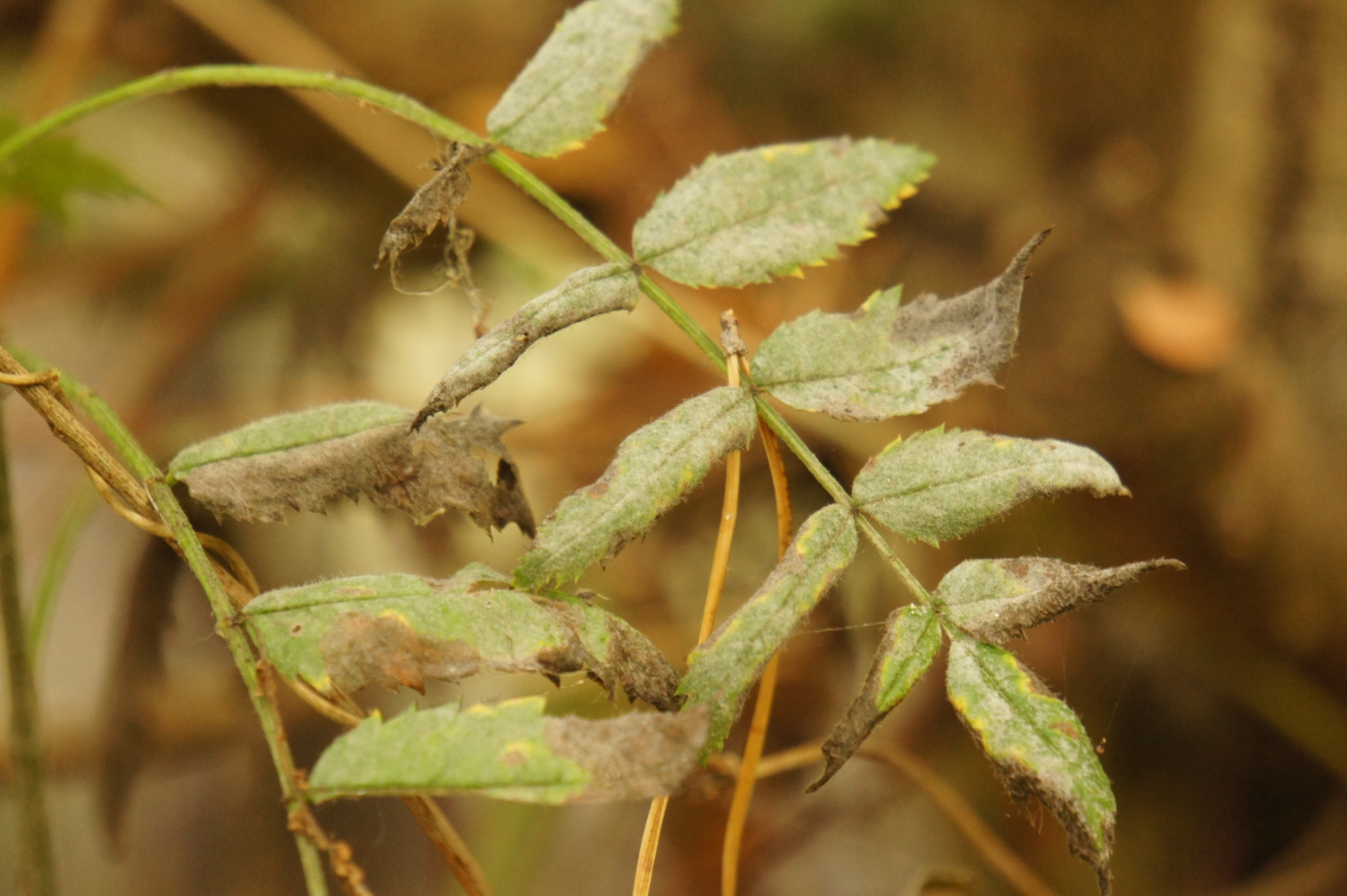

Scientific classification
- Kingdom: Fungi
- Division: Ascomycota
- Class: Leotiomycetes
- Order: Helotiales
- Family: Erysiphaceae
- Genus: Podosphaera
- Species: P. aucupariae

Binomial name
- Podosphaera aucupariae Erikss., 1886

Synonyms
- Podosphaera clandestina var. aucupariae (Erikss.) U. Braun, 1984

= Podosphaera aucupariae =

Species of fungus

Podosphaera aucupariae is a species of powdery mildew in the family Erysiphaceae. It is found in North America and Europe, where it affects rowans/mountain-ashes (genus Sorbus) and service-tree (genus Aria).

== Description ==
The fungus forms thin, white irregular patches on the leaves of its host. It is the only species on Sorbus. On Aria, Podosphaera niesslii can also be found, so care should be taken to identify.

== Taxonomy ==
The fungus was formally described in 1886 by Eriksson.
