= Podosphaera tridactyla =

Scientific classification
- Kingdom: Fungi
- Division: Ascomycota
- Class: Leotiomycetes
- Order: Helotiales
- Family: Erysiphaceae
- Genus: Podosphaera
- Species: P. tridactyla

Binomial name
- Podosphaera tridactyla (Wallr.) de Bary, (1870)

Synonyms
- Alphitomorpha tridactyla Wallr., (1833); Erysiphe bertolinii Roum., (1880); Erysiphe tridactyla (Wallr.) Rabenh., (1844); Oidium passerinii Bertol., (1879); Podosphaera clandestina var. tridactyla (Wallr.) Cooke, (1952); Podosphaera oxyacanthae var. tridactyla (Wallr.) E.S. Salmon,(1900)

Species of fungus

Podosphaera tridactyla is a fungal plant pathogen that causes powdery mildew in multiple Prunus species.
