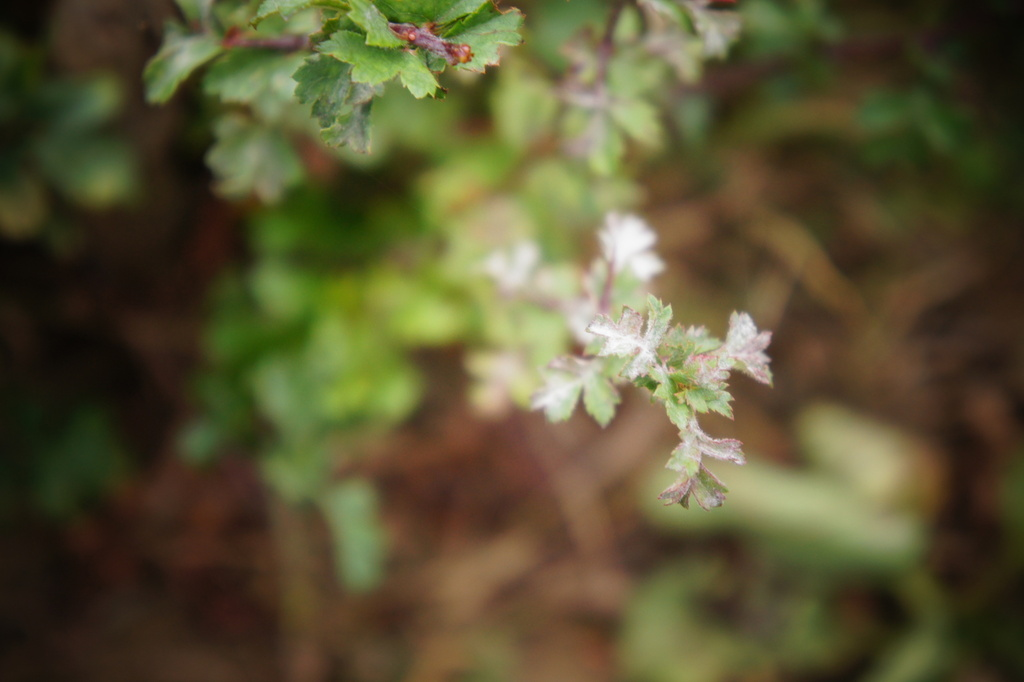
- Podosphaera clandestina on Crataegus in the UK.

Scientific classification
- Kingdom: Fungi
- Division: Ascomycota
- Class: Leotiomycetes
- Order: Helotiales
- Family: Erysiphaceae
- Genus: Podosphaera
- Species: P. clandestina

Binomial name
- Podosphaera clandestina (Wallr.) Lév., 1851

Synonyms
- Alphitomorpha clandestina Wallr., 1819; Erysibe clandestina (Wallr.) Link, 1824; Erysiphe clandestina (Wallr.) Fr., 1829; Erysiphe oxyacanthae DC., 1815; Alphitomorpha oxyacanthae (DC.) Wallr., 1819; Podosphaera oxyacanthae (DC.) de Bary, 1870; Podosphaera kunzei Lév., 1851

= Podosphaera clandestina =

Species of fungus

Podosphaera clandestina is a species of powdery mildew in the family Erysiphaceae. It is found across the world, where it affects plants in the genera Crataegus, Cydonia and Mespilus.

== Description ==
The fungus forms a thin coating on host leaves, typically on young shoots and new branches. Podosphaera clandestina, like most Erysiphaceae, is fairly host-specific and infects only a few genera. Another species of powdery mildew also infects Crataegus: Phyllactinia mali, which has weak, very thin, often smooth growth, on the undersides of leaves.

== Taxonomy ==
The fungus was formally described in 1819 by Wallroth with the basionym Alphitomorpha clandestina. The species was transferred to the genus Podosphaera by Léveillé in 1851.

Podosphaera clandestina is likely a species complex, and comprises multiple varieties with differing host or geographic ranges and slight microscopic differences. var. clandestina is native to Eurasia and found on various Crataegus species; var. cydoniae is found on Cydonia; var. luxurians is found on Crataegus in western North American mountains (Colorado); and var. perlonga is found in the American Midwest (Indiana) on the same host genus. Their macromorphology and full geographic ranges are still not yet well known.
