= List of fungi of South Africa – S =

This is an alphabetical list of the fungal taxa as recorded from South Africa. Currently accepted names have been appended.

== Sa ==
Genus: Saccharomyces

- Saccharomyces acidi-lactici Grotenf.
- Saccharomyces cerevisiae Hansen.
- Saccharomyces fragilis Jorg.
- Saccharomyces sp.

Family: Saccharomycetaceae

Saccharomycetaceae Imperfectae

Genus: Saccobolus

- Saccobolus depauperatus Phill.

Genus: Sacidium

- Sacidium gomphocarpi Kalchbr. & Cooke

Genus: Sagedia

- Sagedia albo-atra Müll.Arg.

Genus: Sarcographa (Lichens)

- Sarcographa disjectans Zahlbr.

Genus: Sarcogyne (Lichen)

- Sarcogyne austro-africana H.Magn.
- Sarcogyne davulus H.Magn.
- Sarcogyne lugens H.Magnus.
- Sarcogyne robiginans H.Magn.

Genus: Sarcoscypha

- Sarcoscypha coccinea Jacq.

== Sc ==
Genus: Schiffnerula

- Schiffnerula cissi Hansf.
- Schiffnerula compositanium Petrak.
- Schiffnerula doidgeae Hansf.
- Schiffnerula gymnosporiae Hansf.
- Schiffnerula nuxiae Hansf.
- Schiffnerula radians Hansf.
- Schiffnerula whitfieldiae Hansf.
- Schiffnerula sp.

Genus: Schinzinia

- Schinzinia pustulosa Fayod (1889),

Genus: Schismatomma (Lichens)

- Schismatomma paradoxum Zahlbr.
- Schismatomma septenarium Zahlbr.

Genus: Schislodes

- Schislodes erysiphina Theiss.

Genus: Schizophyllum

- Schizophyllum alneum J.Schröt. (1889), accepted as Schizophyllum commune Fr. (1815)
- Schizophyllum commune Fr.
- Schizophyllum flabellare Fr.

Genus: Schizosaecharomyces

- Schizosaecharomyces ovis Quin.

Genus: Schizothyriella

- Schizothyriella eylesiana v.d.Byl.

Genus: Schneepia

- Schneepia brachylaenae Rehm
- Schneepia radiata Doidge

Genus: Schroeteriaster

- Schroeteriaster doidgeae Syd.
- Schroeteriaster stratosus Syd.

Genus: Schulzeria Bres. & Schulzer (1886), accepted as Leucoagaricus Locq. ex Singer (1948)

- Schulzeria umkowaan Sacc.

Genus: Scleroderma

- Scleroderma aurantium Pers. (sic), accepted as Scleroderma citrinum Pers.
- Scleroderma bovista Fr.
- Scleroderma capensis Lloyd
- Scleroderma carcinomale Pers.
- Scleroderma cepa Pers.
- Scleroderma flavidum Ell. & Everh.
- Scleroderma geaster Fr.
- Scleroderma laeve Lloyd
- Scleroderma lejospermum de Toni
- Scleroderma nitidum Berk.
- Scleroderma pyramidatum Kalchbr.
- Scleroderma rhodesica Verw.
- Scleroderma stellenbossiensis Verw.
- Scleroderma tenerum Berk. & Curt.
- Scleroderma verrucosum Pers.
- Scleroderma vulgare Homem. ex Fr.

Order: Sclerodermales

Family: Sclerodermataceae

Genus: Sclerogaster

- Sclerogaster africanus Lloyd
- Sclerogaster rhodesica Nel.
- Sclerogaster salisburiensis Verwoerd

Genus: Sclerospora

- Sclerospora butleri Weston.
- Sclerospora graminicola Schroet.
- Sclerospora indica Butler.
- Sclerospora maydis Butler.
- Sclerospora sorghi West. & Epp

Genus: Sclerotinia

- Sclerotinia fructicola (G.Winter) Rehm (1906), accepted as Monilinia fructicola (G.Winter) Honey (1928)
- Sclerotinia sclerotiorum de Bary

Genus: Sclerotium

- Sclerotium cepivorum Berk. 1841, accepted as Stromatinia cepivora (Berk.) Whetzel [as 'cepivorum'], (1945)
- Sclerotium delphinii Welch.
- Sclerotium paspali P.Henn.
- Sclerotium rolfsii Sacc. (1911), accepted as Athelia rolfsii (Curzi) C.C. Tu & Kimbr.
- Sclerotium stipitatum Berk. & Curr.
- Sclerotium sp.

Genus: Scolecodothis

- Scolecodothis capensis Doidge

Genus: Scolecopeltis

- Scolecopeltis cassipoureae Doidge
- Scolecopeltis eugeniae Doidge
- Scolecopeltis morganae Doidge
- Scolecopeltis myrsinis Doidge
- Scolecopeltis strauchii Doidge

Genus: Scolecosporium

- Scolecosporium pedicellatum Dearn. & Overh.

Genus: Scoleiocarpus

- Scoleiocarpus tener Berk.

Genus: Scopulariopsis

- Scopulariopsis sphaerospora F.Zach.

Genus: Scorias

- Scorias sp.

Genus: Scutellinia

- Scutellinia capensis (Nel).
- Scutellinia corpinaria (Nel).
- Scutellinia hemispherica (Nel).

Genus: Scyphophorum

- Scyphophorum monocarpum Ach.

== Se ==
Genus: Sebacina

- Sebacina africana Burt.

Family: Secotiaceae

Genus: Secotium

- Secotium gueinzii Kunze.
- Secotium obtusum Lloyd

Genus: Septobasidium

- Septobasidium bagliettoanum Bres.
- Septobasidium bogoriense Pat.
- Septobasidium carestianum Bres. var. natalense Couch.
- Septobasidium curtisii Boedijn & Steinm
- Septobasidium grandispinosum Couch.
- Septobasidium griseopurpureum Couch.
- Septobasidium mompa Rac.
- Septobasidium natalense Couch.
- Septobasidium pedicellatum Pat.
- Septobasidium philippense Couch.
- Septobasidium protractum Syd.
- Septobasidium pseudopedicellatum Burt.
- Septobasidium sp.

Genus: Septogloeum

- Septogloeum acaciae Verw. & du Pless.
- Septogloeum arachidis Racib., (1898), accepted as Mycosphaerella berkeleyi W.A. Jenkins, (1938)
- Septogloeum bullatum Syd.
- Septogloeum concentricum Syd.
- Septogloeum manihotis Zimm.
- Septogloeum mori Bri. & Cav.
- Septogloeum punetatum Wakef.

Genus: Septoria

- Septoria antirrhini Desm.
- Septoria apii Chester.
- Septoria apii-graveolentis Dorogin.
- Septoria aracearum Sacc.
- Septoria ari
- Septoria atriplicis Fuck.
- Septoria avenae A.B. Frank, (1895), accepted as Phaeosphaeria avenaria f.sp. avenaria O.E. Erikss., (1967)
- Septoria asaleae Vogl.
- Septoria bambusae Verw. & du Pless.
- Septoria buddleiae Kalchbr. & Cooke
- Septoria byliana Syd.
- Septoria capensis Eint.
- Septoria caryophylli Scalia.
- Septoria cephalariae Kalchbr.
- Septoria cercosporioides Trail.
- Septoria chenopodii West.
- Septoria chrysanthemella Sacc.
- Septoria chrysanthemi Allesch.
- Septoria citri Pass.
- Septoria citrulli Ell. & Everh.
- Septoria commelynes Kalchbr. & Cooke.
- Septoria cotyledonis Wakef.
- Septoria cucurbitacearum Sacc.
- Septoria dianthi Desm.
- Septoria doehlii Syd.
- Septoria drummondii Ell. & Everh.
- Septoria eucleae Kalchbr.
- Septoria evansii Syd.
- Septoria fructigena Berk. & Curt.
- Septoria gerberae Syd.
- Septoria gladioli Pass.
- Septoria gomphocarpi P.Henn.
- Septoria graminum Desm., (1843) accepted as Zymoseptoria tritici (Roberge ex Desm.) Quaedvl. & Crous, (2011)
- Septoria gymnosporiae Syd.
- Septoria helianthi Ell. & Kellerm.
- Septoria helichrysi Syd.
- Septoria knowltoniae Verw. & Dipp.
- Septoria lactucae Pass.
- Septoria lolii Sacc.
- Septoria longispora Miyake.
- Septoria lycopersici Speg.
- Septoria meliae Syd.
- Septoria nesodes Kalchbr.
- Septoria nodorum (Berk.) Berk., (1845), accepted as Phaeosphaeria nodorum (E. Müll.) Hedjar., (1969)
- Septoria oenotherae West.
- Septoria oleae Dur. & Mont.
- Septoria ornithogali Pass.
- Septoria osteospermi Dipp.
- Septoria passerini Sacc.
- Septoria passiflorae Louw.
- Septoria pelargonii Syd.
- Septoria perforans McAlp.
- Septoria petroselini Desm.
- Septoria petroselini var. apii Bri. & Cav.
- Septoria pisi West.
- Septoria podocarpi Thuem.
- Septoria polygoni-lapathifolii v.d.Byl.
- Septoria pyricola Desm. accepted as Mycosphaerella pyri (Auersw.) Boerema, (1970)
- Septoria ribis Desm.
- Septoria richardiae
- Septoria rubi Westend.,(1854), accepted as Coryneopsis rubi (Westend.) Grove, (1937)
- Septoria scabiosicola Desm.
- Septoria schlechteriana P.Henn.
- Septoria sparmanniae Verw. & du Pless.
- Septoria thuemenii Sacc.
- Septoria tritici Desm. (1842), accepted as Zymoseptoria tritici (Roberge ex Desm.) Quaedvl. & Crous, (2011)
- Septoria umbelliferarum Kalchbr.
- Septoria vignae P.Henn.
- Septoria zeina Stout.
- Septoria sp.

Genus: Septoriella

- Septoriella striiformis Sacc.

Genus: Septosporium

- Septosporium heterosporum Ell. & Gal.

Genus: Seynesia

- Seynesia balanme Speg. var. africana Sacc.
- Seynesia orbiculata Syd.

== Si ==
Genus: Siphula (Lichens)

- Siphula ceratites Fr.
- Siphula decumbens Kyi.
- Siphula dregei
- Siphula incrustans Vain.
- Siphula minor Vain.
- Siphula tabularis Nyl.
- Siphula torulosa Nyl.

Genus: Sirothecium

- Sirothecium citri Bitanc.

== Sk ==
Genus: Skierka

- Skierka robusta Doidge

== So ==
Genus: Solenia

- Solenia candida Pers.
- Solenia minima Cooke & Phill.

Genus: Solenopezia

- Solenopezia columbina Sacc.

Genus: Solorina (Lichens)

- Solorina sorediifera Nyl.

Genus: Solorinina

- Solorinina sorediifera Stizenb.

Genus: Sordaria

- Sordaria anserina Wint.
- Sordaria curvula de Bary.
- Sordaria pleiospora Wint.
- Sordaria setosa Wint.
- Sordaria sp.

Family:Sordariaceae

Genus: Sorodiscus

- Sorodiscus radicicolus Ivimey Cook

Genus: Sorosporella

- Sorosporella uvella Giard.
- Sorosporella sp.

Genus: Sorosporium

- Sorosporium africanum Syd.
- Sorosporium afrum Syd.
- Sorosporium austroafricanum Zundel.
- Sorosporium brachiariae Hopkins.
- Sorosporium cenchri Zundel.
- Sorosporium clintonii Zundel.
- Sorosporium consanguineum Ell. & Everh.
- Sorosporium cryptum McAlp.
- Sorosporium everhartii Ell. & Gall.
- Sorosporium filiferum Zundel.
- Sorosporium flanaganianum Zundel.
- Sorosporium harrismithense Zundel.
- Sorosporium healdii Zundel.
- Sorosporium holstii P.Henn.
- Sorosporium hotsonii Zundel.
- Sorosporium inconspicuum Zundel.
- Sorosporium panici McKinnon.
- Sorosporium pretoriaense Zundel.
- Sorosporium proliferatum Zundel.
- Sorosporium pseudomaranguense Zundel.
- Sorosporium reilianum (J.G. Kühn) McAlpine (1910), accepted as Sporisorium reilianum (J.G. Kühn) Langdon & Full.,(1978)
- Sorosporium setariae McAlp.
- Sorosporium simii Pole Evans.
- Sorosporium tembuti P.Henn. & Pole Evans
- Sorosporium tristachydis Syd.
- Sorosporium verecundum Zundel.
- Sorosporium versatilis Zundel.
- Sorosporium wildemanianum P.Henn.
- Sorosporium zundelianum Ciferri.
- Sorosporium sp.

== Sp ==
Genus: Spegazzinia

- Spegazzinia meliolae Zimm.

Genus: Sphaceloma

- Sphaceloma ampelinum de Bary. (1874), accepted as Elsinoë ampelina Shear (1929)
- Sphaceloma fawcetti Jenkins.
- Sphaceloma perseae Jenkins.
- Sphaceloma poinsettiae Jenkins.
- Sphaceloma rosarum (Pass.) Jenkins, (1932), avccepted as Elsinoë rosarum Jenkins & Bitanc., (1957)
- Sphaceloma violae Jenkins.
- Sphaceloma sp.

Genus: Sphacelotheca

- Sphacelotheca amphilophis Syd.
- Sphacelotheca andropogonis Bubak.
- Sphacelotheca anthephorae Zundel.
- Sphacelotheca concentrica Zundel.
- Sphacelotheca cruenta (J.G. Kühn) Potter, (1912), accepted as Sporisorium cruentum (J.G. Kühn) Vánky, (1985)
- Sphacelotheca densa Ciferri.
- Sphacelotheca dinteri Zundel.
- Sphacelotheca doidgeae Zundel.
- Sphacelotheca evansii Zundel.
- Sphacelotheca flagellata Zundel.
- Sphacelotheca modesta Zundel.
- Sphacelotheca moggii Zundel.
- Sphacelotheca monilifera Clint.
- Sphacelotheca natalensis Zundel.
- Sphacelotheca panici-miliacei Bubak.
- Sphacelotheca pappophori Zundel.
- Sphacelotheca pretoriense Zundel.
- Sphacelotheca reiliana Clint. accepted as Sporisorium reilianum (J.G. Kühn) Langdon & Full., (1978)
- Sphacelotheca ruprechtii Syd.
- Sphacelotheca sorghi (Ehrenb. ex Link) G.P.Clinton (1902)accepted as Sporisorium sorghi Ehrenb. ex Link (1825)
- Sphacelotheca tenuis Zundel.
- Sphacelotheca transvaalensis Zundel.
- Sphacelotheca vryburgii Zundel.
- Sphacelotheca zilligii Zundel.

Genus: Sphaerella

- Sphaerella agapanthi Kalchbr. & Cooke
- Sphaerella brassicicola de Bary.(sic) possibly (Duby) Ces. & De Not. (1863), accepted as Mycosphaerella brassicicola (Duby) Lindau (1897)
- Sphaerella cassinopsidis Kalchbr. & Cooke
- Sphaerella geicola Kalchbr. & Cooke
- Sphaerella macowaniana Wint.
- Sphaerella maculicola Wint.
- Sphaerella myrsinis Kalchbr. & Cooke

Genus: Sphaeria

- Sphaeria africana Kalchbr. & Cooke
- Sphaeria brachiata Kalchbr. & Cooke
- Sphaeria caffra Kalchbr. & Cooke
- Sphaeria capensis Lev.
- Sphaeria cervispora Kalchbr. & Cooke
- Sphaeria cumana Sacc. & Speg.
- Sphaeria graminis Pers. var. ehrhartae Berk.possibly accepted as Phyllachora graminis (Pers.) Fuckel, (1870)
- Sphaeria hypoxylon Linn.
- Sphaeria intercepta Kalchbr. & Cooke
- Sphaeria lanceolata Kalchbr. & Cooke
- Sphaeria lichenoides Berk.
- Sphaeria metidoidea Kalchbr. & Cooke
- Sphaeria nesodes Berk. & Br. f. hydrocotles asiatcae.
- Sphaeria nigro-annulata Berk. & Curt.
- Sphaeria owaniae Kalchbr. & Cooke
- Sphaeria refracta Kalchbr. & Cooke
- Sphaeria tremelloides Linn.
- Sphaeria turbinaia Pers.
- Sphaeria urticae Rabenh.

Genus: Sphaericeps

- Sphaericeps lignipes Welv. & Curr.

Family: Sphaeriaceae

Order: Sphaeriales

Family: Sphaerioidaceae

Family: Sphaerobolaceae

Genus: Sphaerobolus

- Sphaerobolus stellatus Tode ex Pers.

Genus: Sphaerodothis

- Sphaerodothis parinarii Nel.

Genus: Sphaeronema

- Sphaeronema pistillare Wallr.

Family: Sphaerophcraceae

Genus: Sphaerophoron

- Sphaerophoron compressum Ach.

Genus: Sphaerophorus

- Sphaerophorus inelanocarpus DC.

Genus: Sphaerophragmium

- Sphaerophragmium artabotrydis Doidge
- Sphaerophragmium dalbergiae Diet.

Order: Sphaeropsidales

Genus: Sphaeropsis

- Sphaeropsis abnormis Berk. & Thuem.
- Sphaeropsis cassinopsidis Pazschke.
- Sphaeropsis congesta Lev.
- Sphaeropsis enormis Sacc.
- Sphaeropsis corticalis Sacc.
- Sphaeropsis malorum Peck.(sic), possibly (Berk.) Berk. (1860), accepted as Botryosphaeria stevensii Shoemaker, (1964)
- Sphaeropsis mappae Cooke
- Sphaeropsis pinicola Speg.
- Sphaeropsis rafniicola P.Henn.
- Sphaeropsis sp.

Genus: Sphaerostilbe

- Sphaerostilbe coccophila Tul.
- Sphaerostilbe flammea Tul.
- Sphaerostilbe hypocreoides Kalchbr. & Cooke
- Sphaerostilbe incarnata Kalchbr.
- Sphaerostilbe macowani Cooke
- Sphaerostilbe nigrescens Kalchbr. & Cooke
- Sphaerostilbe pseudotrichia (Schwein.) Berk. & Broome, (1873), accepted as Nectria pseudotrichia (Schwein.) Berk. & M.A. Curtis, (1853)
- Sphaerostilbe rosea Kalchbr.

Genus: Sphaerotheca

- Sphaerotheca fuliginea Salm. (sic) (Schltdl.) Pollacci, (1913), accepted as Podosphaera fuliginea (Schltdl.) U. Braun & S. Takam., (2000)
- Sphaerotheca humuli Burr. accepted as Podosphaera macularis (Wallr.) U. Braun & S. Takam., (2000)
- Sphaerotheca humuli var. fuliginea Salm. probably accepted asPodosphaera macularis (Wallr.) U. Braun & S. Takam., (2000)
- Sphaerotheca macularis Jacz. (sic) probably accepted asPodosphaera macularis (Wallr.) U. Braun & S. Takam., (2000)
- Sphaerotheca pannosa (Wallr.) Lév. (1851), accepted as Podosphaera pannosa (Wallr.) de Bary, (1870)
- Sphaerotheca pannosa var. persicae Woron. (1914), accepted as Podosphaera pannosa (Wallr.) de Bary, (1870)

Genus: Sphaerulina

- Sphaerulina eucalypti Verw. & du Pless.
- Sphaerulina oleifolia v.d. Byl.
- Sphaerulina worsdellii Mass.

Genus: Sphinctrina

- Sphinctrina fuscescens Nyl.
- Sphinctrina gelasinata Zahlbr.
- Sphinctrina meridionalis Stizenb.
- Sphinctrina microcephala Nyl.
- Sphinctrina turbinaia deNot.

Genus: Spondylocladium

- Spondylocladium atrivirens Harz.

Genus: Spongospora

- Spongospora subterranea Lagerh.

Genus: Sporidesmium

- Sporidesmium celastri Thuem.
- Sporidesmium polymorphum Corda.

Genus: Sporopodium

- Sporopodium leucoxanthemum Vain.

Genus: Sporormia

- Sporormia ambigua Niessl.
- Sporormia intermedia Auersw.
- Sporormia minima Auersw.
- Sporormia pascua Niessl.
- Sporormia transvaalensis Doidge

Genus: Sporotrichum

- Sporotrichum beurmanni Matruchot & Ramond. accepted as Sporothrix schenckii Hektoen & C.F.Perkins (1900)
- Sporotrichum carougeaui Langeron.
- Sporotrichum citri Butl.
- Sporotrichum epiphyllum Link.
- Sporotrichum globuliferum Speg.
- Sporotrichum paranense Marchion.
- Sporotrichum roseum Link.
- Sporotrichum schencki Matruchot.
- Sporotrichum schencki var. beurmanni Doidge
- Sporotrichum sp.

Genus: Spumaria

- Spumaria alba DC.

== Sq ==
Genus: Squamaria

- Squamaria speciosa Frege.

== St ==
Genus: Stachybotrys

- Stachybotrys atra Corda. accepted as Stachybotrys chartarum (Ehrenb.) S.Hughes
- Stachybotrys subsimplex Cooke

Genus: Stachylidium

- Stachylidium theobromae Turcz.

Genus: Staganospora

- Staganospora atriplicis Lindau.
- Staganospora cryptogea Syd.
- Staganospora kentiae Maubl.
- Staganospora nerinicola Dipp.

Genus: Staurothele

- Staurothele clopima Th.Fr.

Genus: Stemphylium

- Stemphylium eugeniae Verw, & du Pless
- Stemphylium phyllogenum Sacc.
- Stemphylium sp.

Genus: Stephanophoron

- Stephanophoron phyllocarpum var. daedaleum Stizenb.

Genus: Stephanophorou

- Stephanophorou phyllocarpum var. isidiosum Stizenb.

Genus: Stephanophorus

- Stephanophorus kraussii Flotow.

Genus: Stereocaulon (Lichen)

- Stereocaulon proximum Nyl.
- Stereocaulon pulvinatum Ach.
- Stereocaulon tabulare Ach.

Genus: Stereum

- Stereum acerinum Pets, ex Fr.
- Stereum adnatum Lloyd.
- Stereum affine Lev.
- Stereum albo-badium Fr.
- Stereum amoenum Kalchbr. & MacOwan.
- Stereum atrocinereum v.d. Byl.
- Stereum australe Lloyd.
- Stereum bellum Sacc.
- Stereum bicolor (Pers.) Fr., (1838), accepted as Laxitextum bicolor (Pers.) Lentz, 1956
- Stereum bresadoleanum Lloyd.
- Stereum caperatum Lloyd.
- Stereum cinerascens Mass.
- Stereum cinereum Lev.
- Stereum concolor Sacc.
- Stereum cyphelloides Berk. & Curt.
- Stereum diaphanum Cooke ex Saec.
- Stereum durbanense v.d.Byl.
- Stereum duriusculum Berk. & Br.
- Stereum elegans Mey.
- Stereum fasciatum Fr.
- Stereum friesii Lev.
- Stereum fulvum Sacc.
- Stereum fuscum Quel. (sic), possibly (Schrad.) P.Karst., (1883) accepted as Laxitextum bicolor (Pers.) Lentz, 1956
- Stereum glabrescens Berk.& Curt.
- Stereum hirsutum Fr.
- Stereum hirsutum f. kalchbrenneri
- Stereum involutum Klotzsch ex Fr.
- Stereum kalchbrenneri Sacc.
- Stereum laxum Lloyd, (1915) accepted as Laxitextum bicolor (Pers.) Lentz, 1956
- Stereum lobatum Fr.
- Stereum lobatum var. cinereum Lloyd.
- Stereum luteo-badium Fr.
- Stereum membranaceum Fr.
- Stereum murrayi Burt.
- Stereum nitidulum Berk.
- Stereum notatum Berk. & Br.
- Stereum ochraeeo-flavum Peck.
- Stereum ostrea Fr.
- Stereum percome Berk. & Br.
- Stereum perlatum Berk.
- Stereum proximum Lloyd.
- Stereum pulverulentum Lev.
- Stereum purpureum Fr. (sic), possibly Pers. (1794), accepted as Chondrostereum purpureum (Pers.) Pouzar (1959)
- Stereum pusillum Berk.
- Stereum radicans Burt.
- Stereum ravenelii Berk. & Curt.
- Stereum retirugum Cooke
- Stereum rimosum Berk.
- Stereum rimosum var. africanum Talbot.
- Stereum rubiginosum Fr.
- Stereum rugosum Fr.
- Stereum sanguinolentum Fr.
- Stereum schomburgkii Berk.
- Stereum spadiceum Fr.
- Stereum subpileatum Berk.,
- Stereum tabacinum Sow. ex Fr. var. australis Mont.
- Stereum tenebrosum Lloyd.
- Stereum thozetii Berk.
- Stereum tomentosum v.d.Byl.
- Stereum transvaalium v.d.Byl.
- Stereum turgidum Lloyd.
- Stereum umbrinum Berk. & M.A. Curtis, (1873), accepted as Lopharia crassa (Lév.) Boidin, (1959)
- Stereum vellereum Berk.
- Stereum versicolor Fr.
- Stereum villosum Lev.
- Stereum vitile Fr.
- Stereum vorticosum Fr. accepted as Chondrostereum purpureum (Pers.) Pouzar (1959)

Genus: Sterrebeckia

- Sterrebeckia geaster Fr.
- Sterrebeckia lejosperma Fr.

Genus: Stichodothis

- Stichodothis disciformis Petrak.

Genus: Stichomyces

- Stichomyces capensis Thaxt.

Genus: Stichospora

- Stichospora disciformis Petrsk.

Genus: Sticta (Lichens)

- Sticta ambavillaria Ach.
- Sticta argyracea Del.
- Sticta argyracea f. rigidula Zahlbr.
- Sticta argyracea var. aspera Krempelh.
- Sticta argyracea var. flavescens Zahlbr.
- Sticta aspera Laur.
- Sticta aurata Ach.
- Sticta aurata var. pallens Nyl.
- Sticta carpoloma Del. var. albocyphellata Nyl
- Sticta clathrata deNot.
- Sticta elathrata var. subhirsuta Vain.
- Sticta crocata Ach.
- Sticta crocata var. gilva Ach.
- Sticta crocata var. isidialia Gyeln.
- Sticta damaeeomis Ach.
- Sticta ecklonii Spreng.
- Sticta endochrysea Del.
- Sticta erythroscypha Tayl.
- Sticta fuliginosa Aeh.
- Sticta gilva Ach.
- Sticta gilva var. angustilobata Gyeln.
- Sticta gilva var. lanata Gyeln.
- Sticta gilva var. pseudogilva Gyeln.
- Sticta homemanni Fr.
- Sticta hottentotta Ach.
- Sticta hottentotta var. umbilicata Del.
- Sticta intricata Del.
- Sticta intrieata var. hesseana Zahlbr.
- Sticta limbata Aeh.
- Sticta mougeotiana Del.
- Sticta mougeotiana var. aurigera Nyl.
- Sticta pulmonacea Ach.
- Sticta pulmonaria var. hypomela (Delise) Duby (1830), accepted as Lobaria pulmonaria (L.) Hoffm. (1796)
- Sticta guercizans Ach.
- Sticta subcrocata Gyeln.
- Sticta sylvatica Ach.
- Sticta retigera Ac.
- Sticta thouarsii Del.
- Sticta tomentosa Ach.
- Sticta variabilis Ach.
- Sticta weigelii Ach.
- Sticta weigelii var. sublimbata Steiner.

Family: Stictaceae

Genus: Stictina

- Stictina argyracea Nyl.
- Stictina argyracea var. flavescens Nyl.
- Stictina argyracea var. rigidula Nyl.
- Stictina aurata Aeh.
- Stictina carpoloma Nyl. var. albocyphellata Nyl.
- Stictina crocata Nyl.
- Stictina fuliginosa Nyl.
- Stictina gilva Nyl.
- Stictina hesseana Krempelh.
- Stictina intricata Nyl.
- Stictina intricata var. thouarsii Nyl.
- Stictina limbata Nyl.
- Stictina membranacea Müll.Arg.
- Stictina mougeotiana var. aurigera Nyl.
- Stictina quercizans Nyl.
- Stictina quercizans Stizenb.
- Stictina sylvatica Nyl.
- Stictina tomentosa Nyl.

Genus: Stictis

- Stictis bella Kalchbr. & Cooke.
- Stictis radiata Pers. ex Fr.
- Stictis thelotremoides Phill.

Genus: Stigmatea

- Stigmatea grewiae P.Henn.
- Stigmatea platylophi Verw. & du Pless.
- Stigmatea rhynchosiae Kalchbr. & Cooke.
- Stigmatea sutherlandiae Kalchbr. & Cooke.

Family:Stigmateaceae

Genus: Stigmatidium

- Stigmatidium capense Stizenb.
- Stigmatidium venosum Nyl.

Genus: Stigmatolemina

- Stigmatolemina incanum Kalchbr.

Genus: Stigmatopeltis

- Stigmatopeltis royenae Doidge

Genus: Stigmatida

- Stigmatida rhynchosiae Syd.
- Stigmatida sutherlandiae Syd.

Genus: Stigmella

- Stigmella graminicola Linder.

Genus: Stigmina

- Stigmina verruculosa Syd.

Family:Stilbaceae

Genus: Stilbospora

- Stilbospora faureae Syd.

Genus: Stilbum

- Stilbum aurantio-cinnabarinum Speg.
- Stilbum caespitosum Welw. & Curr.
- Stilbum cineripes Kalchbr. & Cooke.
- Stilbum cinnabarinum Mont. (1837), accepted as Tubercularia lateritia (Berk.) Seifert (1985)
- Stilbum connatum Kalchbr. & Cooke.
- Stilbum fimetarium Pers.
- Stilbum fimetarium var. simiarum Kalchbr.
- Stilbum kalchbrenneri Sacc.
- Stilbum lateritium Berk. (1840), accepted as Tubercularia lateritia (Berk.) Seifert (1985)
- Stilbum physarioides Kalchbr.

Genus: Stomiopeltella

- Stomiopeltella africana Doidge

Genus: Stomiopeltis

- Stomiopeltis citri Bitanc.
- Stomiopeltis petiolaris Doidge

Genus: Streptothrix

- Streptothrix sp.

Genus: Strigula (Lichens)

- Strigula actinoplacoides Vain.
- Strigula africana Wain. var. natalensis Vain.
- Strigula argyronema Müll.Arg.
- Strigula complanata Nyl.
- Strigula complanata var. virescens Nyl.
- Strigula elegans Müll.Arg.
- Strigula nemathora Mont.
- Strigula pallida Kalchbr.
- Strigula virescens Trevis.

Family: Strigulaceae (Lichens)

Genus: Strobilomyces

- Strobilomyces strobilaceus Berk.

Genus: Stropharia

- Stropharia albomaculata Kalchbr. & MacOwan
- Stropharia coronilla Quel.
- Stropharia melanosperma Quel.
- Stropharia obturata Quel.
- Stropharia olivaceo-flava Sacc.
- Stropharia semiglobata (Batsch) Quél. (1872), accepted as Protostropharia semiglobata (Batsch) Redhead, Moncalvo & Vilgays (2013)

== Sy ==
Genus: Synalissa (lichens)

- Synalissa austroafricana Zahlbr.
- Synalissa aminuscula Nyl.

Genus: Syncephalastrum

- Syncephalastrum racemosum Schroet.

Family: Synchytriaceae

Genus: Synchytrium

- Synchytrium cotulae du Pless.
- Synchytrium dolichi Gaiimann.
- Synchytrium endobioticum Perc.

Genus: Synechoblastis

- Synechoblastis redundans Müll.Arg.

Genus: Systremma

- Systremma pterocarpi Doidge

== See also ==
- List of bacteria of South Africa
- List of Oomycetes of South Africa
- List of slime moulds of South Africa
- List of fungi of South Africa
  - List of fungi of South Africa – A
  - List of fungi of South Africa – B
  - List of fungi of South Africa – C
  - List of fungi of South Africa – D
  - List of fungi of South Africa – E
  - List of fungi of South Africa – F
  - List of fungi of South Africa – G
  - List of fungi of South Africa – H
  - List of fungi of South Africa – I
  - List of fungi of South Africa – J
  - List of fungi of South Africa – K
  - List of fungi of South Africa – L
  - List of fungi of South Africa – M
  - List of fungi of South Africa – N
  - List of fungi of South Africa – O
  - List of fungi of South Africa – P
  - List of fungi of South Africa – Q
  - List of fungi of South Africa – R
  - List of fungi of South Africa – S
  - List of fungi of South Africa – T
  - List of fungi of South Africa – U
  - List of fungi of South Africa – V
  - List of fungi of South Africa – W
  - List of fungi of South Africa – X
  - List of fungi of South Africa – Y
  - List of fungi of South Africa – Z
