= Sporisorium reilianum =

Scientific classification
- Kingdom: Fungi
- Division: Basidiomycota
- Class: Ustilaginomycetes
- Order: Ustilaginales
- Family: Ustilaginaceae
- Genus: Sporisorium
- Species: S. reilianum

Binomial name
- Sporisorium reilianum (J.G. Kühn) Langdon & Full. (1978)

Synonyms
- Ustilago reiliana J.G.Kühn (1875); Cintractia reiliana (J.G.Kühn) Clinton (1900); Sporisorium reilianum (J.G.Kühn) McAlpine (1910); Sphacelotheca holci-sorghi Cif. (1938); Sphacelotheca reiliana (J.G.Kühn) G.P.Clinton (1902); Sorosporium holci-sorghi (Rivolta) Moesz (1950); Sporisorium holci-sorghi (Rivolta) Vánky (1985); Ustilago holci-sorghi Rivolta

Species of fungal plant pathogen

Sporisorium reilianum (J.G. Kühn) Langdon & Full., (1978), previously known as Sphacelotheca reiliana, and Sporisorium reilianum, is a species of biotrophic fungus in the family Ustilaginaceae. It is a plant pathogen that infects maize and sorghum.

== Hosts and symptoms ==
Sporisorium reilianum causes the diseases maize head smut and sorghum head smut. This soil borne smut fungus has two formae speciales. S. reilianum f. sp. reilianum is specific to sorghum and S. reilianum f. sp. zeae is specific to maize. It is unknown why the two formae speciales cannot form spores on their respective non-favored hosts.

Symptoms of the fungus are expressed on both the tassels of corn and sorghum as well as on the actual ear in the form of large smut galls. When the sorghum tassel is infected, the fragile gall membrane will have a range from just a few black spores to a large mass of black spores covering the tassel. The spores are a sign of the disease and are used for dispersal of the disease to other corn and sorghum plants. When the ear of the corn is infected, it looks very small and tear-drop shaped and seems as though it does not have a cob inside at all. The cob is replaced by white sori which are the structures that make and hold the spores of the fungus. If there is an infected tassel, it is likely that the ears will also have head smut.

== Life cycle ==
Sporisorium reilianum is noted to have a sexual stage in its disease cycle similar to that of Ustilago maydis. Initial infections occur on roots of young seedlings. The pathogen develops systemically and is found on ear and tassel tissues as the host plant matures. At maturity teliospores can be found in the white sori of the infected heads of corn. These will be easily dispersed by the wind. Favorable nutritive soil and weather conditions around 23-30 °C allows for germination of the teliospores in the soil. Generation of a four-celled basidium occurs, leading to haploid basidiospores that create sporidia. These sporidia fuse due to a compatibility or likeness that induces the formation of dikaryotic mycelium, which is infectious and parasitic. This intracellular mycelium can be found invaded in parts of the flowering development of the corn, and S. reilianum can completely decrease floral tissue due to an ability to detect floral induction.

S. reilianum is biotrophic in that it depends on the maize or sorghum for growth and survival. The inflorescence of the male or female parts of the plants, female being the ear and the male being the tassel can be affected by the timing of infection by this species. Necrosis and disease development is most prevalent on the head of the infected host.

== Environment ==
Maize head smut occurs in most maize-growing areas, including many regions of North America, Australia, Asia, and southern Europe. It causes tremendous loss of yield during outbreaks due to the replacement of the ear with large smut sori. To infect maize roots, S. reilianum f. sp. zeae must form a dikaryotic parasitic hypha which results for the mating of two compatible haploid strains. The infection always occurs in soil via the root, unlike Ustilago maydis, another maize smut, which infects maize plants via aerial parts. Temperatures of 23-30 °C are optimal for field infection of corn, suspected to be due to maximum teliospore germination.

== Management ==
Detection of S. reilianum is a key step toward the development of an effective disease management system. Conventional methods, including pathogen isolation and microscopic morphological study, are labor-intensive and cumbersome, and sometimes yield inconclusive results. Rapid, specific and sensitive molecular tools, such as PCR, are required for the detection and evaluation of S. reilianum. In 1999 there was developed a DNA-based assay for the detection of S. reilianum and its differentiation from Ustilago maydis. More recently, in 2012, a method using Fourier transform infrared spectrometry was established for identification of S. reilianum spores.

Head smut can be controlled by use of resistant cultivars and seed treatment with fungicides. Foliar application of fungicides have not controlled the disease. Crop rotation is of questionable value because the smut spores can survive for long periods in the soil. It has been suggested that the most economical and environmentally friendly method to reduce maize yield losses is to breed and deploy resistant maize hybrids. In comparison with other cereal crops, such as rice (Oryza sativa) and wheat (Triticum aestivum), maize has fewer qualitative resistance genes that have been used extensively by breeders. Instead, maize has relatively more quantitative resistance loci deployed in the field to counter the majority of diseases. In other words, maize resistance to S. reilianum is thought to be under polygenic control. The cumulative effects of multiple smaller-effect quantitative resistance loci can produce high or even complete resistance.

== Importance ==
The pathogenic tendency of Sporisorium reilianum as illustrated above is to carry out its life cycle in congruence with the growth of either maize or sorghum as the host plant. For example, In place of ears of corn; plant-like sorus develop. The onset of this smut is sporadic and slowly progressive however disease severity is high. For example, a field of corn can have 10% infected with yield loss that has an 80% apparent infection rate. Post infection treatment to eliminate or reduce the disease are marginally effective or ineffective. The massive crop loss that this pathogen can create is devastating to producers who are unaware of the teliospores overwintering in the soil; which, can survive for many years. Treatment of seeds with a fungicide during planting or prior to harvest is important to limit the spread of spores especially if high risk field areas known by the producer. It is important to limit transmission of spores to disease free areas via harvesting equipment or planting tools. The incidence of Sporisorium reilianum occurs in occurs in Africa, Europe, U.S., and China. Fungicide use in the market today indicates that there are about 52 million acres of cereals lost worldwide a year.

== Pathogenesis ==
Sporosorium relianium has shown the ability to sense the presence of nearby plants. This pathogen always infects via the roots, and hyphal proliferation near the roots is a characterization of the early stage of this Fungal pathogen. During the Basido-phase, basidiospores grow as haploid saprophytic yeasts. These yeasts join to form dikaryotic hyphae which in turn infect the host plant via the roots. It has been demonstrated on two varieties of maize that plant root exudates impact the growth and branching of S. relianium endomycorrhizal fungi prior to fungal contact with the root.
