= Preussia =

Preussia can refer to:

- Preussia (fungus), a genus of fungi
- Preussia (katydid), a genus of bush crickets or katydids in the family Tettigoniidae, subfamily Phaneropterinae
