= Sporisorium ellisii =

Scientific classification
- Domain: Eukaryota
- Kingdom: Fungi
- Division: Basidiomycota
- Class: Ustilaginomycetes
- Order: Ustilaginales
- Family: Ustilaginaceae
- Genus: Sporisorium
- Species: S. ellisii

Binomial name
- Sporisorium ellisii (G. Winter) M. Piepenbr.

Synonyms
- Sorosporium ellisii G.Winter

Species of fungus

Sporisorium ellisii is a parasitic species of fungus in the family Ustilaginaceae, a family of smut fungi, that infects various members of Andropogon, a widespread genus of perennial bunchgrasses. In plants infected by S. ellisii, the fungus often invades the reproductive structures, rendering them sterile.

== List of host plants ==
Species of Andropogon that are hosts for S. ellisii include:

- Andropogon virginicus
