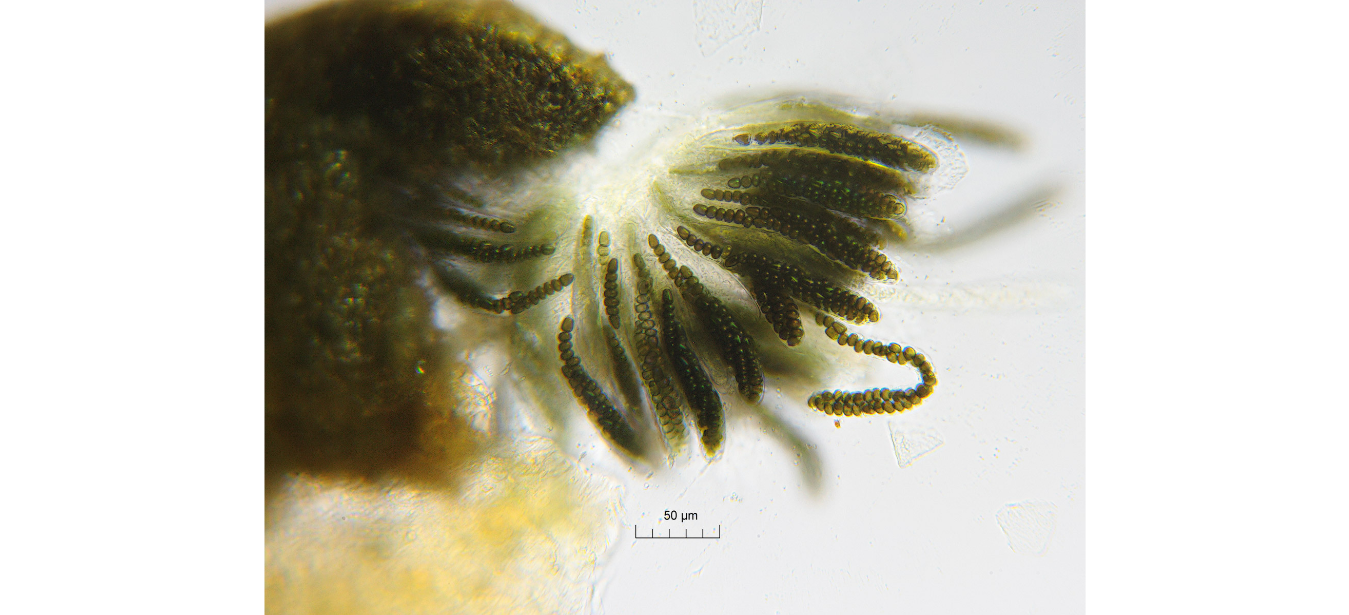
- Sporormiella vexans asci exiting fungi

Scientific classification
- Kingdom: Fungi
- Division: Ascomycota
- Class: Dothideomycetes
- Order: Pleosporales
- Family: Sporormiaceae
- Genus: Sporormiella; Ellis & Everh.

Type species
- Sporormiella nigropurpurea Ellis & Everh.

= Sporormiella =

Genus of fungi

Sporormiella is a genus of fungi in the phylum Ascomycota whose species can be found worldwide, including the Arctic. It grows primarily on dung but also can be found in soil and plant debris. The exact number of species is debated and can range from 60 to 80 in total depending on the source. A majority of these species are coprophilous, however, there are a few that are endophytes (S. minimoides) and saprobic.

Their lifecycle is thought to require herbivorous digestion, via wild or domestic herbivores, in order for spores to properly germinate although this is still under review. After being consumed and passed through the digestive tract, their fruitbodies utilize herbivorous dung as a substrate to reproduce via asci. This genus is characterized by their dark, olive-brown, 4-celled spores with a defined germ slit that are contained within a gelatinous sheath that they are forcibly ejected from and stick to nearby vegetation where they will hopefully be eaten and repeat their lifecycle.

This association with herbivorous animals has allowed this fungus to be utilized in a paleontological context as a proxy for megafauna presence and abundance in the late Quaternary period. Research has primarily focused on the use of this proxy to track the decline of megafauna in North America in the Late Pleistocene as spores can be present in high abundances within areas with large assemblages of large grazing animals are present. It is hypothesized that these groups of large animals will produce more dung and thus, more Sporormiella will be present and wash into water basins where they can be later detected in lake sediment cores; although the potential biases of using this proxy, such as spore abundances being higher at shorelines closer to grazing activity, are being discovered and discussed the more this proxy is used.

== Taxonomy ==
The genus was originally described by Ellis & Everh. in 1892 with the type species Sporormiella nigropurpurea. It was originally described separately from the genus Sporormia based on the morphological feature of a dark fungal stroma; a stroma is generally defined as a dense mass of hyphae that acts a precursor to reproductive fungal structures. In 1972, Ahmed & Cain published a paper that refuted the presence of a stroma (although the dung surface was blackened) and triggered an investigation in the validity of the genus' establishment. During this investigation, the paper mentions the brief split of the genus Sporormia into two genera: Sporormiopsis & Sporormia as proposed in 1944, but this decision was nullified when Sporormiopsis was determined to be synonymous with Sporormiella. This brief split resulted in conflicting names for Sporormiella minima (current name) which was the type species, Sporormiopsis minima. Due to this brief naming issue, the species, minima, is still known under three genera: Preussia, Sporormia, & Sporormiella.

The exact number of species in the Sporormiella genus is debated and varies between different databases. Ahmed & Cain's paper created a dichotomous key for 66 described species which include detailed illustrations of all except five non-coprophilous species. The Global Biodiversity Information Facility only lists 61 species in their database that utilizes data from the Species Fungorium Project based in the Royal Botanic Gardens Kew. Meanwhile, Ainsworth & Bisby's Dictionary of The Fungi lists 80 species in the genus.

== Morphology ==
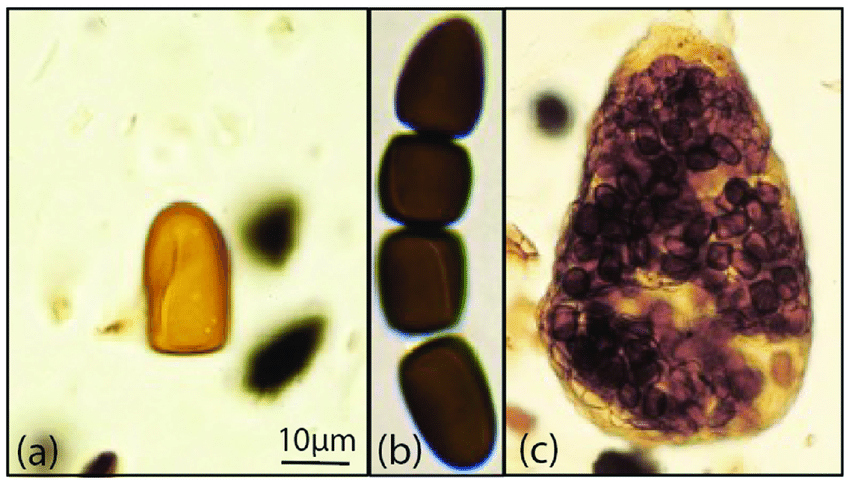
Microscopic image of Sporormiella sexual morph a) single ascospore cell b) single four celled ascospore c) pseudothecia

In Sporormiella, the sexual stage (easiest to observe) consists of small, dark brown, and glabrous (smooth and without ornamentation) to hairy pseudothesia that are unilocular (single cavity) and contain bitunicate asci. Pseudothesium are a double-walled fungal structure that are the sites of spore production but lack well-organized hymenium (spore-bearing surfaces) as seen in perithesia. Asci are translucent, cylindrical to clavate, and are gelatinous. They contain eight, dark to olive-brown ascospores that segmented into four cells and have a germ slit that are ejected from the asci and pseudothecium upon maturity and the spore will stick to nearby vegetation to be eaten and digested.

The asexual stage is characterized by septate hyphae and exists primarily within herbivorous digestion tracts.

== Ecology ==
Sporormiella is a genus of coprophilous fungi that can be found worldwide, including the Arctic. As many of the species within this genus utilize dung as a substrate and are present within herbivorous intestinal tracts, it can potentially be carried long distances. They are not restricted to a specific taxonomic group and therefore can be consumed by a variety of organisms besides mammals including birds, reptiles, etc which allows this genus to potentially travel long distances. This generalist lifestyle has allowed these fungi to persist for thousands of years as part of the nutrient cycling system and has become of interest to scientists to indicate the presence and abundance of herbivores over time. Currently, there are calls for studies of potential obligate associations between Sporormiella species and certain herbivores; for instance, they are heavily associated with mammoths, if a species was discovered to be a specialist with mammoths, it could provide a stronger proxy in studies and procure a better understanding of Sporormiella's impacts within ecosystems through the ages.

=== Life history ===
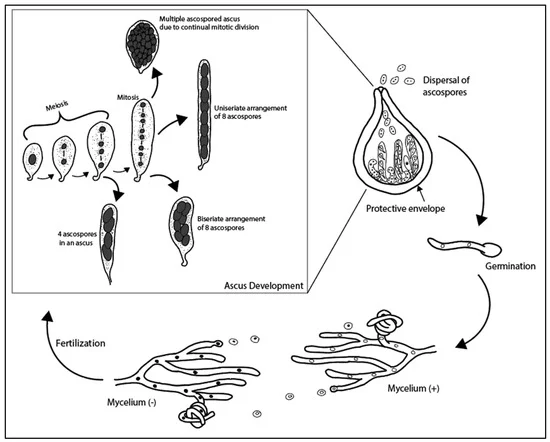
General depiction of ascospore production and lifecycle of fungus with fruitbodies in the form of perithecia. NOTE: This depicts a perithecia and not a psuedothecia as seen in Sporormiella. It also does not include the herbivorous digestion stage which is thought to trigger germination of ascospores.

Sporormiella generally follows the lifecycle of a coprophilous fungus in a majority of the species within this genus. In the ascus, meiosis occurs and produces four ascospores which is followed by mitosis allowing the ascus to develop eight total spores. Upon maturation, the spores will be expelled from the ascus, away from the dung and stick on vegetation such as a blade of grass. The spore will stick to the vegetation until it succumbs to desiccation or is consumed by a herbivorous animal, where it will travel through the digestive tract; it is debated if this genus requires this stage for germination, similarly to the phylum Neocallimastigomycota, or not. After excretion from the animal, the fungi will grow on the digested plant matter substrate via septated hyphae and eventually enter its sexual stage as a telomorph where it will produce its fruitbody in the form of a pseudothesia. In this pseudothecia, asci will develop and the process of meiosis and mitosis will occur again to produce spores.

No anamorph has been reported for this genus yet.

== Paleontological importance ==
While this genus may seem inconspicuous, it has become a popular proxy used by paleoecologists worldwide in the pursuit of gathering data on ancient herbivores, with a major focus on megafauna in North America during the Quaternary period. In this area of study, the spores of Sporormiella are counted in lake core samples and converted into dung abundance and potential herbivore biomass. These data points are then compared to the fossil record, pollen record, and other proxies to search for potential correlations and patterns. Spores enter the lake sediment records via slopewash of excrement from the surrounding landscape carrying spores into the lake ecosystem.

The most well known application of this proxy is to track the decline and eventual extinction events of megafauna in North America with mammoths being of key interest. Sporormiella spores have been found within the gut contents and on mammoth coprolites; however, a specific species has not been identified from these findings yet so scientists are unsure how specified this interaction is. Regardless, Sporormiella remains one of the most utilized mycological proxies in the field. A larger herbivorous biomass present in an area could be associated with a bigger production of excrement, allowing the proliferation of this genus to potentially represent general distribution patterns.

There are two other genera that are also used as a proxy, Podospora and Sordaria, although Sporormiella remains the most popular as it is often the most abundant in samples and is relatively easy to identify.

=== Limitations ===
This proxy contains some limitations and biases that are being rectified today. Spores can be easily confused with other coprophilous fungi but especially the genus Pruessia due to their similar morphologies. There are also issues with spore concentrations nearest to the shore where herbivorous activity occurred and the center of lakes leaving an uneven distribution of spores throughout a basin and potentially impacting data collection. The reason for lake sediment cores being taken in the middle of lakes is due to these areas often providing the best opportunities for pollen collection and stratification of sediment over the years with lower chances of sediment mixing as compared to the shoreline. Another issue that is often brought up is the lack of understanding how spores preserve in different substrates and if different processes affect the spore abundance and thus data collected.

It is also important to note that these coprophilous fungi are often generalists of herbivorous dung and have been found on smaller mammal dung and are being used as proxies for non-mammalian groups in some studies like one conducted in New Zealand that used this genus to trace the extinct Moa birds. This versatility can be advantageous in some studies (as previously mentioned) but also can create "noise" in studies that are attempting to track abundances of specific groups, such as mammoths.

=== Future studies ===
While there are many papers that are scrutinizing the use of Sporormiella as a proxy, there are a few suggestions on future studies that could be conducted to mitigate potential biases.

- Identify specialists within Sporormiella to narrow data results, for instance, identifying if the spores often found with mammoths are specialists to this genus. Even specialization down to the taxonomic group of megafaunal herbivores would cut down on biases.
- Study and identify how spores react and preserve in different substrates and if this affects spore abundance.
- Calibrate modern analogs of relative spore abundance near the shores versus lake centers to compare to ancient samples and account for red herrings in data.
