= S. cinnabarina =

S. cinnabarina may refer to:

- Salvia cinnabarina, a flowering plant
- Sophronitis cinnabarina, a small orchid
- Stilbella cinnabarina, a plant pathogen
