= Eremodothis =

Scientific classification
- Kingdom: Fungi
- Division: Ascomycota
- Class: Dothideomycetes
- Order: Pleosporales
- Family: Sporormiaceae
- Genus: Eremodothis; Arx

Type species
- Eremodothis angulata Arx

Genus of fungi

Eremodothis is a genus of fungi in the family Sporormiaceae.
