= Sporormiaceae =

Scientific classification
- Kingdom: Fungi
- Division: Ascomycota
- Class: Dothideomycetes
- Order: Pleosporales
- Family: Sporormiaceae; Munk (1957)

Type genus
- Sporormia Munk (1957)

Genera
- See text

Family of fungi

The Sporormiaceae are a family of fungi in the order Pleosporales. Taxa have a cosmopolitan distribution and are saprobic on dung (coprophilous) and rotting vegetation.

== Description ==
The Sporormiaceae are characterized by having dark brown, septate spores with germ slits.

== Genera ==
As accepted by GBIF;

- Anekabeeja Udaiyan & V.S.Hosagoudar, 1992
- Chaetopreussia M.Locquin-Linard, 1977 (2)
- Forliomyces Phukhams., Camporesi & K.D.Hyde, 2016 (2)
- Niesslella
- Pleophragmia Fuckel (4)
- Preussia Fuckel, 1867 (138)
- Preussiella Lodha
- Pycnidiophora
- Sparticola Phukhams., Ariyaw., Camporesi & K.D.Hyde, 2016 (7)
- Sporormia De Not., 1845 (37)
- Sporormiella Ellis & Everh., 1892 (79)
- Spororminula Aa, 1987
- Sporormurispora Wanas., Bulgakov, Gafforov & K.D.Hyde, 2018 (5)
- Westerdykella Stolk (34)

Figures in brackets are approx. how many species per genus.
