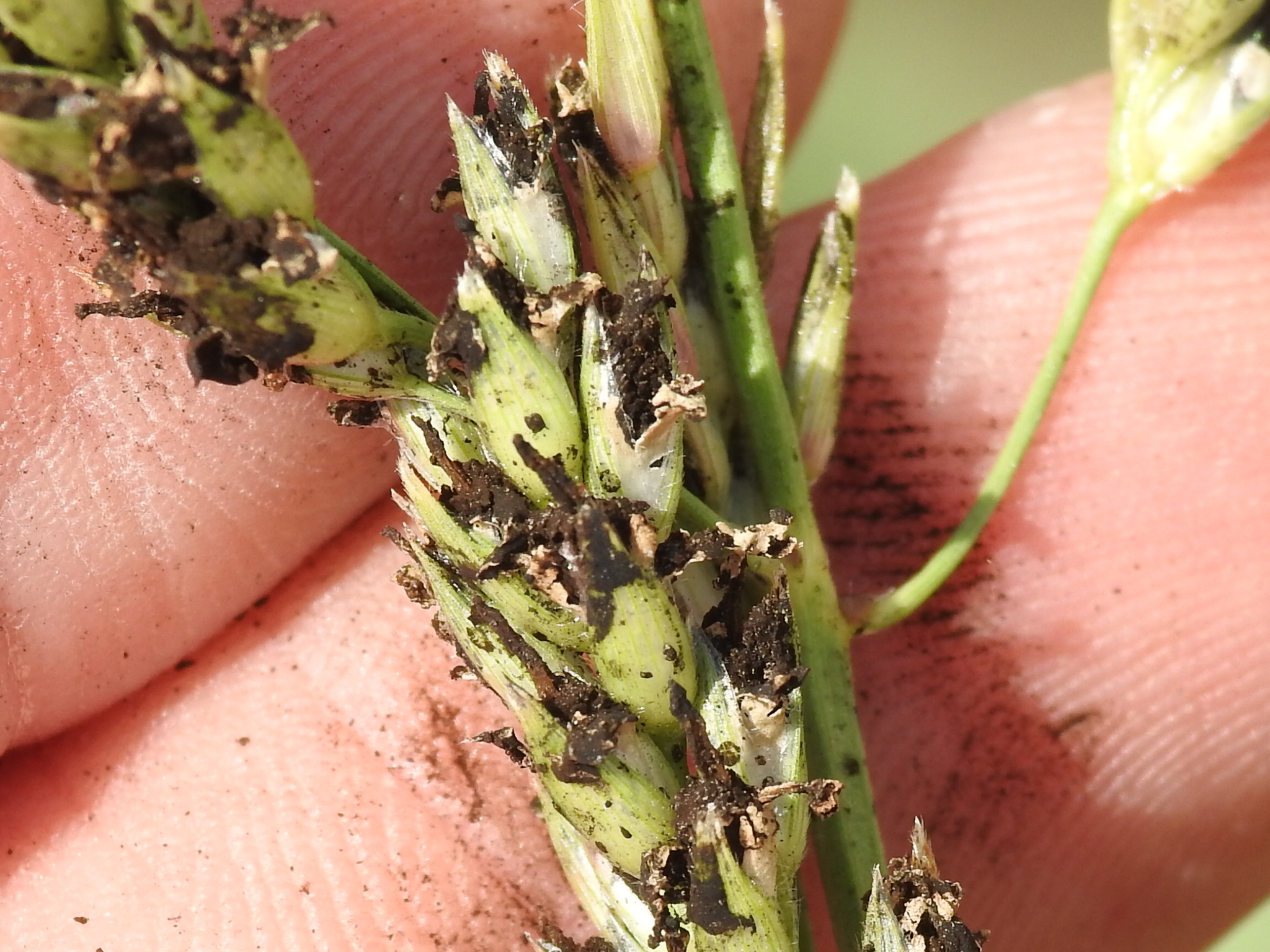
- Loose kernel smut

Scientific classification
- Kingdom: Fungi
- Division: Basidiomycota
- Class: Ustilaginomycetes
- Order: Ustilaginales
- Family: Ustilaginaceae
- Genus: Sporisorium
- Species: S. cruentum

Binomial name
- Sporisorium cruentum (J.G. Kühn) Vánky, (1985)

Synonyms
- Sphacelotheca cruenta (J.G. Kühn) Potter, (1912); Sphacelotheca holci H.S. Jacks., (1934); Ustilago cruenta J.G. Kühn, (1872)

= Sporisorium cruentum =

Species of fungus

Sporisorium cruentum is a plant pathogen infecting sorghum, known as Loose kernel smut.
