= Spororminula =

Scientific classification
- Kingdom: Fungi
- Division: Ascomycota
- Class: Dothideomycetes
- Order: Pleosporales
- Family: Sporormiaceae
- Genus: Spororminula; Arx & Aa

Type species
- Spororminula tenerifae Arx & Aa

Genus of fungi

Spororminula is a genus of fungi in the family Sporormiaceae. This is a monotypic genus, containing the single species Spororminula tenerifae.
