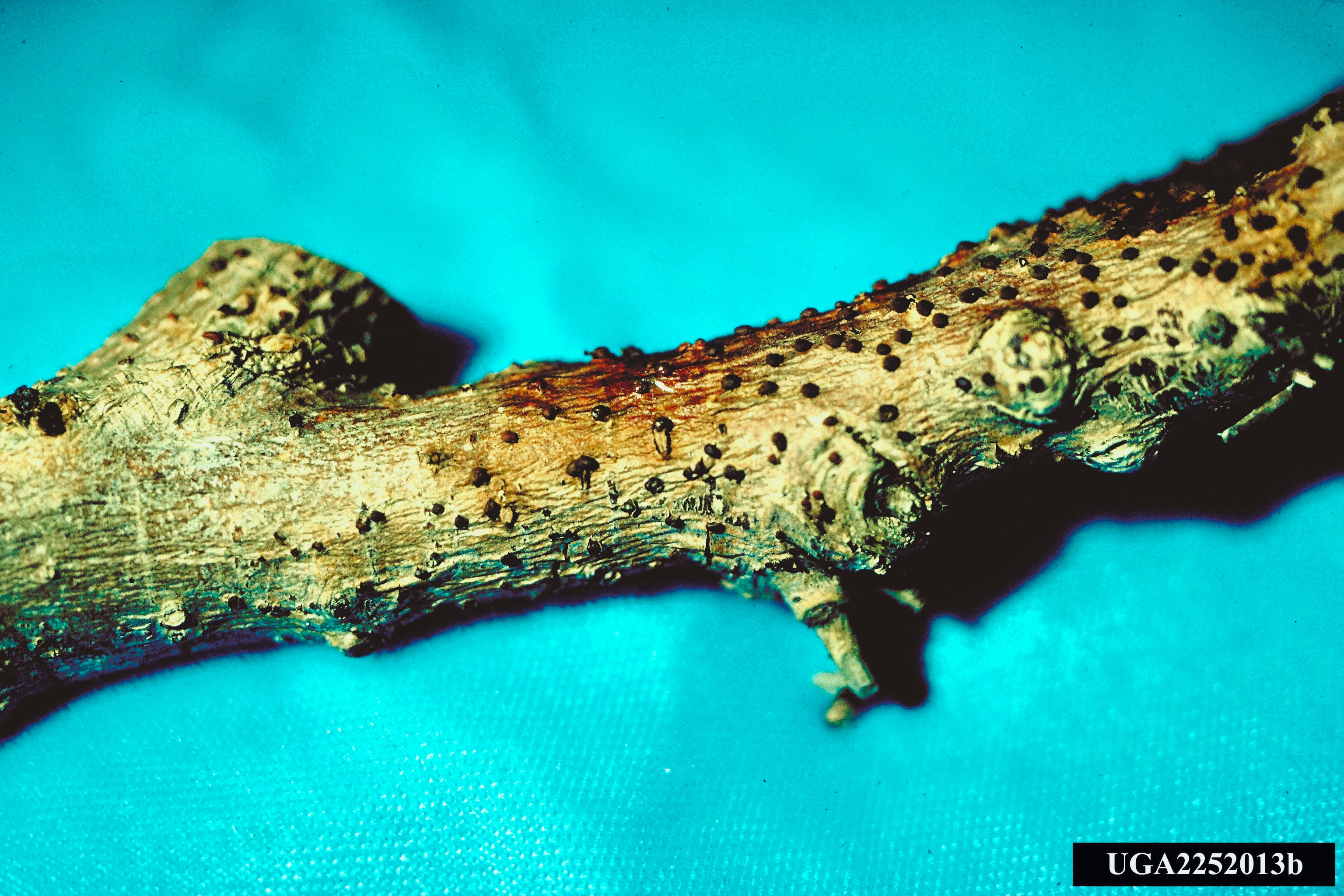
- Tubercularia ulmea fruiting bodies on Siberian elm.

Scientific classification
- Domain: Eukaryota
- Kingdom: Fungi
- Division: Ascomycota
- Class: Sordariomycetes
- Order: Hypocreales
- Family: Nectriaceae
- Genus: Tubercularia
- Species: T. ulmea

Binomial name
- Tubercularia ulmea J.C.Carter (1947)

= Tubercularia ulmea =

Species of fungus

Tubercularia ulmea is a fungal plant pathogen infecting elms.
