= Westerdykella =

Scientific classification
- Kingdom: Fungi
- Division: Ascomycota
- Class: Dothideomycetes
- Order: Pleosporales
- Family: Sporormiaceae
- Genus: Westerdykella; Stolk

Type species
- Westerdykella ornata Stolk

Genus of fungi

Westerdykella is a genus of fungi in the family Sporormiaceae.
