= Pleophragmia =

Scientific classification
- Kingdom: Fungi
- Division: Ascomycota
- Class: Sordariomycetes
- Order: Microascales
- Family: Microascaceae
- Genus: Pleophragmia; Fuckel

Type species
- Pleophragmia leporum Fuckel

Genus of fungi

Pleophragmia is a genus of fungi in the family Sporormiaceae. This is a monotypic genus, containing the single species Pleophragmia leporum.
