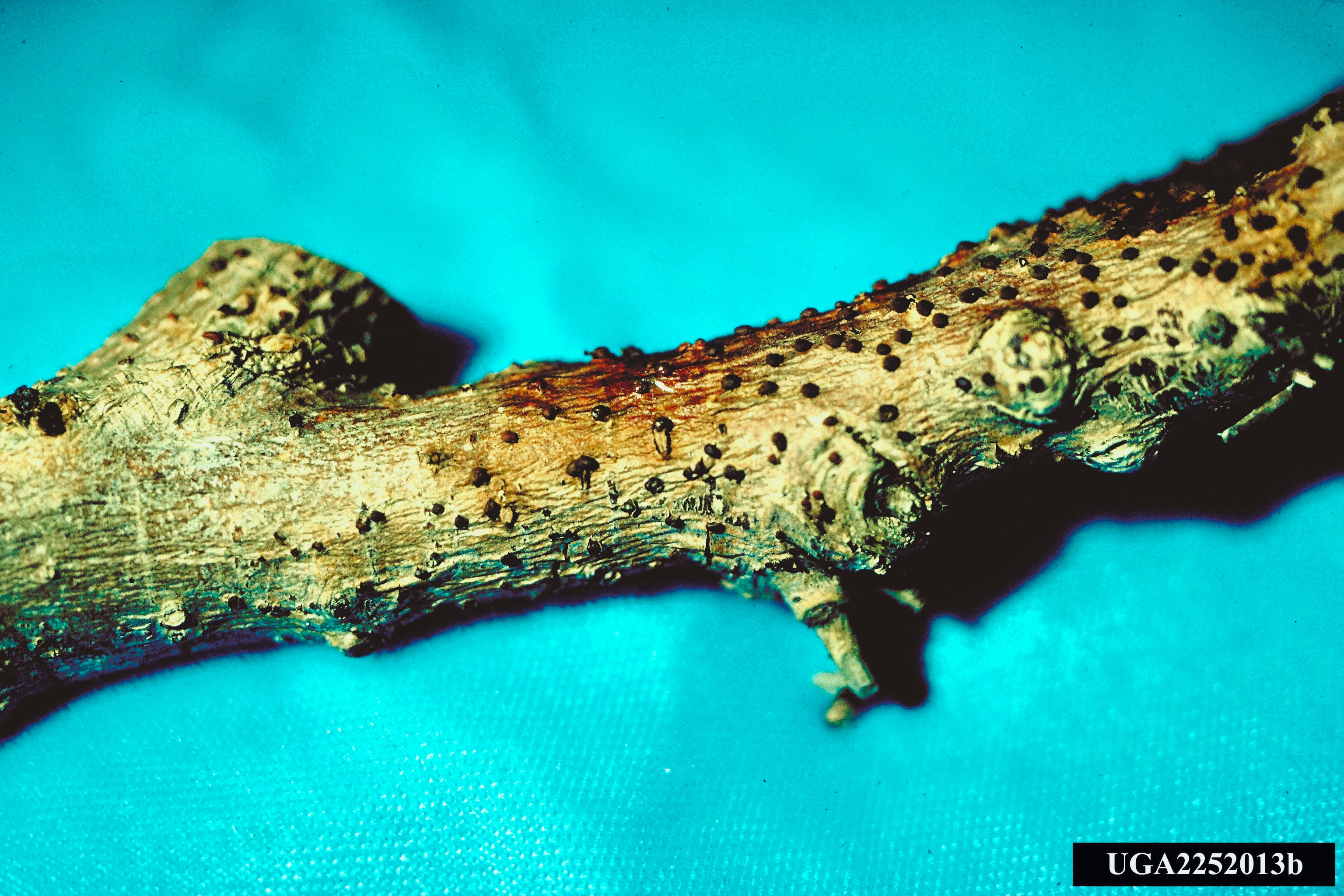
- Tubercularia ulmea fruiting bodies on Siberian elm.

Scientific classification
- Domain: Eukaryota
- Kingdom: Fungi
- Division: Ascomycota
- Class: Sordariomycetes
- Order: Hypocreales
- Family: Nectriaceae
- Genus: Tubercularia; Tode 1790

Species
- See text

= Tubercularia =

Genus of fungi

Tubercularia is a genus of fungi in the family Nectriaceae. With the change to single name nomenclature in fungi, Tubercularia is now considered a synonym of Nectria.

== Species ==
- Tubercularia abrotani
- Tubercularia abutilonis
- Tubercularia acaciae
- Tubercularia aceris
- Tubercularia acinorum
- Tubercularia aequatoriensis
- Tubercularia aesculi
- Tubercularia agaves
- Tubercularia ailanthi
- Tubercularia ampelophila
- Tubercularia antarctica
- Tubercularia aquifolia
- Tubercularia argentina
- Tubercularia armeniaca
- Tubercularia artemisiae
- Tubercularia atomospora
- Tubercularia atra
- Tubercularia aurantiaca
- Tubercularia aurata
- Tubercularia australiensis
- Tubercularia berberidis
- Tubercularia berolinensis
- Tubercularia betulae
- Tubercularia bicolor
- Tubercularia brassicae
- Tubercularia bresadolae
- Tubercularia buxi
- Tubercularia cacao
- Tubercularia cactophila
- Tubercularia calycanthi
- Tubercularia canadensis
- Tubercularia cansjerae
- Tubercularia carneola
- Tubercularia carpogena
- Tubercularia castaneae
- Tubercularia cattleyicola
- Tubercularia cava
- Tubercularia celastri
- Tubercularia cerasi
- Tubercularia cinnabarina
- Tubercularia circinata
- Tubercularia citri
- Tubercularia citrina
- Tubercularia coccicola
- Tubercularia coccophila
- Tubercularia concentrica
- Tubercularia conorum
- Tubercularia corchori
- Tubercularia coryli
- Tubercularia crassostipitata
- Tubercularia crenulata
- Tubercularia cyathoidea
- Tubercularia decolorans
- Tubercularia depressa
- Tubercularia difformis
- Tubercularia discoidea
- Tubercularia dubia
- Tubercularia effusa
- Tubercularia endogena
- Tubercularia epimyces
- Tubercularia ericetorum
- Tubercularia erumpens
- Tubercularia eryngicola
- Tubercularia eucalypti
- Tubercularia euonymi
- Tubercularia expallens
- Tubercularia fasciculata
- Tubercularia fatiscens
- Tubercularia fici
- Tubercularia filicis
- Tubercularia flavescens
- Tubercularia flavogranulata
- Tubercularia floccosa
- Tubercularia fraserae
- Tubercularia fructicola
- Tubercularia fungicola
- Tubercularia fungiformis
- Tubercularia fusispora
- Tubercularia galii
- Tubercularia gallarum
- Tubercularia garciniae
- Tubercularia georginae
- Tubercularia geranii
- Tubercularia glandicola
- Tubercularia granulata
- Tubercularia grayana
- Tubercularia guaranitica
- Tubercularia gyrosa
- Tubercularia hamata
- Tubercularia harpostipitata
- Tubercularia helleboricola
- Tubercularia herbarum
- Tubercularia hibisci
- Tubercularia hirsuta
- Tubercularia hirtissima
- Tubercularia hoheriae
- Tubercularia hollii
- Tubercularia hydnoidea
- Tubercularia hysterina
- Tubercularia insignis
- Tubercularia jodinae
- Tubercularia kazakhstanica
- Tubercularia kmetiana
- Tubercularia laburni
- Tubercularia lateritia
- Tubercularia leguminicola
- Tubercularia leguminum
- Tubercularia lepidolophae
- Tubercularia leptosperma
- Tubercularia leucoloma
- Tubercularia leucopus
- Tubercularia leveillei
- Tubercularia libertiana
- Tubercularia liceoides
- Tubercularia lichenicola
- Tubercularia ligustri
- Tubercularia longipes
- Tubercularia longispora
- Tubercularia lutescens
- Tubercularia macrozamiae
- Tubercularia maculicola
- Tubercularia maeshimana
- Tubercularia magnoliae
- Tubercularia marginata
- Tubercularia menispermi
- Tubercularia miniata
- Tubercularia minor
- Tubercularia minuta
- Tubercularia minutispora
- Tubercularia mori
- Tubercularia mutabilis
- Tubercularia nigra
- Tubercularia nigrescens
- Tubercularia nigricans
- Tubercularia nigromaculans
- Tubercularia nomuriana
- Tubercularia olivacea
- Tubercularia orchidearum
- Tubercularia ossicola
- Tubercularia pachypus
- Tubercularia paeoniicola
- Tubercularia palmae
- Tubercularia paraguaya
- Tubercularia passerinii
- Tubercularia pelargonii
- Tubercularia pezizoidea
- Tubercularia phacidioides
- Tubercularia phyllophila
- Tubercularia pinastri
- Tubercularia pini
- Tubercularia pinophila
- Tubercularia pircuniae
- Tubercularia polycephala
- Tubercularia populi
- Tubercularia prostii
- Tubercularia pruinosa
- Tubercularia pruni
- Tubercularia pseudacaciae
- Tubercularia pteleae
- Tubercularia puerariae
- Tubercularia puiggarii
- Tubercularia pulverulenta
- Tubercularia purpurata
- Tubercularia pusilla
- Tubercularia pyricola
- Tubercularia radicalis
- Tubercularia radicicola
- Tubercularia ramalinella
- Tubercularia rhamni
- Tubercularia rhodophila
- Tubercularia rhois
- Tubercularia ribesii
- Tubercularia ricini
- Tubercularia robiniae
- Tubercularia rosella
- Tubercularia rubi
- Tubercularia saccharicola
- Tubercularia salicis
- Tubercularia saligna
- Tubercularia sambuci
- Tubercularia sarmentorum
- Tubercularia schweinfurthii
- Tubercularia sessilis
- Tubercularia spezazzinii
- Tubercularia sphaeroidea
- Tubercularia subdiaphana
- Tubercularia subpedicellata
- Tubercularia sulcata
- Tubercularia toxicodendri
- Tubercularia trachypus
- Tubercularia ulmea
- Tubercularia ussuriensis
- Tubercularia vaginata
- Tubercularia velutipes
- Tubercularia velutipites
- Tubercularia vermicularis
- Tubercularia versicolor
- Tubercularia volutella
- Tubercularia volvata
- Tubercularia zythioides
