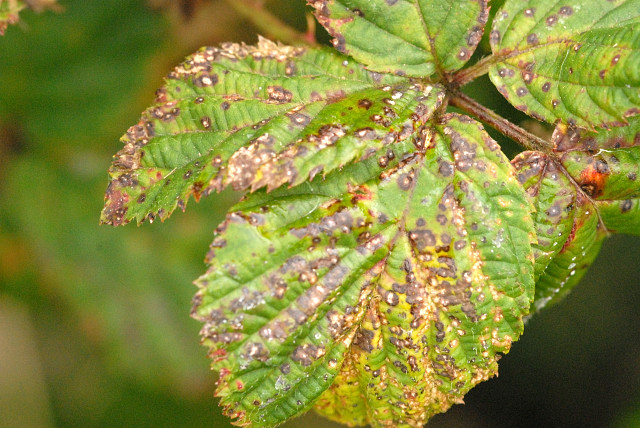
- Coryneopsis rubi

Scientific classification
- Domain: Eukaryota
- Kingdom: Fungi
- Division: Ascomycota
- Class: Sordariomycetes
- Order: Amphisphaeriales
- Family: Amphisphaeriaceae
- Genus: Coryneopsis; Grove 1933

Species
- See text

= Coryneopsis =

Genus of fungi

Coryneopsis is a fungus genus. Index Fungorum considers it a synonym of Seimatosporium.

== Species ==
- Coryneopsis canina
- Coryneopsis cisticola
- Coryneopsis corni-albae
- Coryneopsis foliicola
- Coryneopsis henriquesiana
- Coryneopsis lirella
- Coryneopsis microsticta
- Coryneopsis rubi
- Coryneopsis tamaracis otherwise Coryneopsis tamaricis
- Coryneopsis viburni
