= Pycnidiophora =

Scientific classification
- Kingdom: Fungi
- Division: Ascomycota
- Class: Dothideomycetes
- Order: Pleosporales
- Family: Sporormiaceae
- Genus: Pycnidiophora; Clum

Type species
- Pycnidiophora dispersa Clum

Genus of fungi

Pycnidiophora is a genus of fungi in the family Sporormiaceae.
