= Chaetopreussia =

Scientific classification
- Kingdom: Fungi
- Division: Ascomycota
- Class: Dothideomycetes
- Order: Pleosporales
- Family: Sporormiaceae
- Genus: Chaetopreussia; Locq.-Lin.

Type species
- Chaetopreussia chadefaudii Locq.-Lin.

Genus of fungi

Chaetopreussia is a genus of fungi in the family Sporormiaceae. This is a monotypic genus, containing the single species Chaetopreussia chadefaudii.
