= Sporisorium sorghi =

Scientific classification
- Kingdom: Fungi
- Division: Basidiomycota
- Class: Ustilaginomycetes
- Order: Ustilaginales
- Family: Ustilaginaceae
- Genus: Sporisorium
- Species: S. sorghi

Binomial name
- Sporisorium sorghi Ehrenb. ex Link (1825)

Synonyms
- Cintractia sorghi-vulgaris (Tul. & C.Tul.) G.P.Clinton (1897); Sphacelotheca sorghi (Ehrenb. ex Link) G.P.Clinton (1902); Tilletia sorghi-vulgaris Tul. & C.Tul. (1847); Ustilago condensata Berk. (1877); Ustilago sorghi (Ehrenb. ex Link) Pass. (1873); Ustilago tulasnei J.G.Kühn (1874)

Species of fungus

Sporisorium sorghi, commonly known as sorghum smut, is a plant pathogen that belongs to the Ustilaginaceae family. This fungus is the causative agent of covered kernel smut disease and infects sorghum plants all around the world such as Sorghum bicolor (S. vulgare) (sorghum), S. sudanense (Sudan grass), S. halepense (Johnson grass) and Sorghum vulgare var. technichum (broomcorn). Ineffective control of S. sorghi can have serious economic and ecological implications.

== Taxonomy ==
A collection of S. sorghi on sorghum grass allowed Ehrenberg to establish the genus Sporisorium in 1825. This genus was replaced by Sphacelotheca, a genus established by de Bary. Soon after, G. P. Clinton transferred Sporisorium to this genus instead, giving it the name Sphacelotheca sorghi. Ontogeny studies provide evidence that Sporisorium is restricted to parasitic smut fungi. This support allowed for the reinstatement of the Sporisorium genus by Langdon & Fullerton and for the reclassification of S. sorghi into this genus. Other members of Sphacelotheca were also renamed to Sporisorium after proving they were harmful to grasses. Ustilago and Sporisorium genera are closely related, but descriptions made by Link and Langdon & Fullerton allow for a taxonomic boundary of these genera based on variation in columellae, sterile cells, and spore balls. Vánky transferred species within Ustilago to Sporisorium following this differentiation.

== Hosts and symptoms ==
Susceptible hosts of Sporisorium sorghi infection consist of all groups of sorghum plants. Main hosts include Sorghum bicolor, Sorghum caffrorum, Sorghum dochna, and Sorghum sudanense. Incidences of infection in perennial grasses have also been reported. S. sorghi is the causative agent of sorghum smut or covered kernel smut disease.

Symptoms of infection by S. sorghi are typically expressed as the plant matures and begins to head. At this time, grain kernels are replaced by fungal spore-producing structures known as sori. Smut sori are covered by a peridium, a tough membrane that appears grayish-brown in color. The shape of sori, themselves, are generally oval or conical. Oftentimes sori appear as an elongated sorghum seed. Variations in the size of sori range anywhere from 0.4 to 1.3 cm long and 0.2-0.4 cm wide. Glumes, or tiny leaves, will sometimes cover very small sori. They appear white, gray, or brown in color. In some instances, sori may have a striped appearance. Dark brown, powder-like masses of sori may be concentrated on a particular region of an infected head, or in some instances, all kernels of a smutted head can be destroyed. Missing or distorted spikelets covered in sori on the sorghum panicles also indicate signs of infection in rare instances.

== Life cycle ==
Planting of a sorghum kernel infected with S. sorghi leads to the development of fungal structures that occur alongside the growth of the plant. These seedborne structures are known as teliospores, and they germinate as the sorghum plant matures by colonizing plant tissues and the apical meristem. No signs of fungal growth arise until plant maturation, or heading. At harvest time, the membranes surrounding the sori of infected kernels rupture. This releases the teliospores inside, allowing them to adhere to the surface of healthy seeds on other plants. Teliospores that do this will overwinter, where they remain in a dormant state and resume their pathogenicity when conditions resume being favorable. Some teliospores, when released will go on to contaminate soils. Because spores must be seed-borne in order to cause infection, soilborne teliospores are insignificant in terms of seedling infections.

Conditions suited for delayed germination of sorghum seedlings provide optimum conditions for S. sorghi infection. Because spore formation occurs as seedlings mature, S. sorghi attempts to avoid environments that allow the plants to grow rapidly and escape infection. Temperatures ranging from 20 to 30 degrees Celsius allow maximum spore production. Warm, wet soils outside of this temperature range (15.5-33.2 degrees C) have been shown to decrease the incidence of seedling infection. A variety of other factors such as host variability and depth of seedling sowing also affect the prevalence at which infection occurs.

== Distribution ==
Sorghum grains are found in all regions of the world as they act as a major food crop for both humans and livestock in areas with little precipitation and high temperatures. Covered kernel smut disease has been reported in all continents, and is found to be the most common smut disease in areas where untreated seeds are planted. Asia and Africa combined account for more than 80% of sorghum production in the world, making these two continents especially susceptible to S. sorghi infection. In sorghum-growing states of India, S. sorghi infection has become one of the most serious diseases.

== Prevention and control ==
To effectively manage the spread of disease caused by S. sorghi, the presence of S. sorghi infection must be detected early on in sorghum development. Symptoms of infection don't present themselves until heading occurs, but research has demonstrated that microscopy and PCR techniques are useful in differentiating healthy from infected sorghum seedlings early on in their life cycle. Knowing this information will be beneficial for the early detection of S. sorghi and the implementation of more effective control measures.

Currently, covered kernel smut and S. sorghi are controlled by using protectant fungicides to treat infected seeds. This method is very effective, reliable, and simple as it prevents the fungi from being introduced into an uninfected field of sorghum. However, in some less developed countries, this method is not sustainable as this practice is expensive and oftentimes not available. In these instances, cultural methods may be used where seeds are soaked in water for four hours and then dried in the sun. Such methods keep intact seed viability while destroying spores. S. sorghi spores can live in the soil for long periods of time so rotation of crops every four years is another method of control. The burning of sorghum plants before the release of teliospores may be effective, although this does reduce crop yield. Planting the sorghum kernels in 15.5-32 degree Celsius soil further serves as a preventative measure that limits S. sorghi germination.

== Importance ==
The fungal spores of S. sorghi enter and grow within the ovary of sorghum plants. Release of teliospores following sori membrane rupturing causes spores to contaminate other plants and nearby soils. Spores are long-lived structures that are difficult to eliminate. Without the use of seed treatments, S. sorghi infection can have serious economic and ecological impacts. Small-scale farms and developing countries tend to have more restricted use of fungicides, and therefore see a greater incidence of S. sorghi infection. More than 100 million people in sub-Saharan Africa depend on sorghum as a staple food source, and over 500 million people are dependent on sorghum in Africa and Asia combined. In the early 1900s, S. sorghi infection was responsible for a loss of 3 million dollars across the U.S. Loss of this plant by S. sorghi infection can be drastic in these parts of the world along with others.
