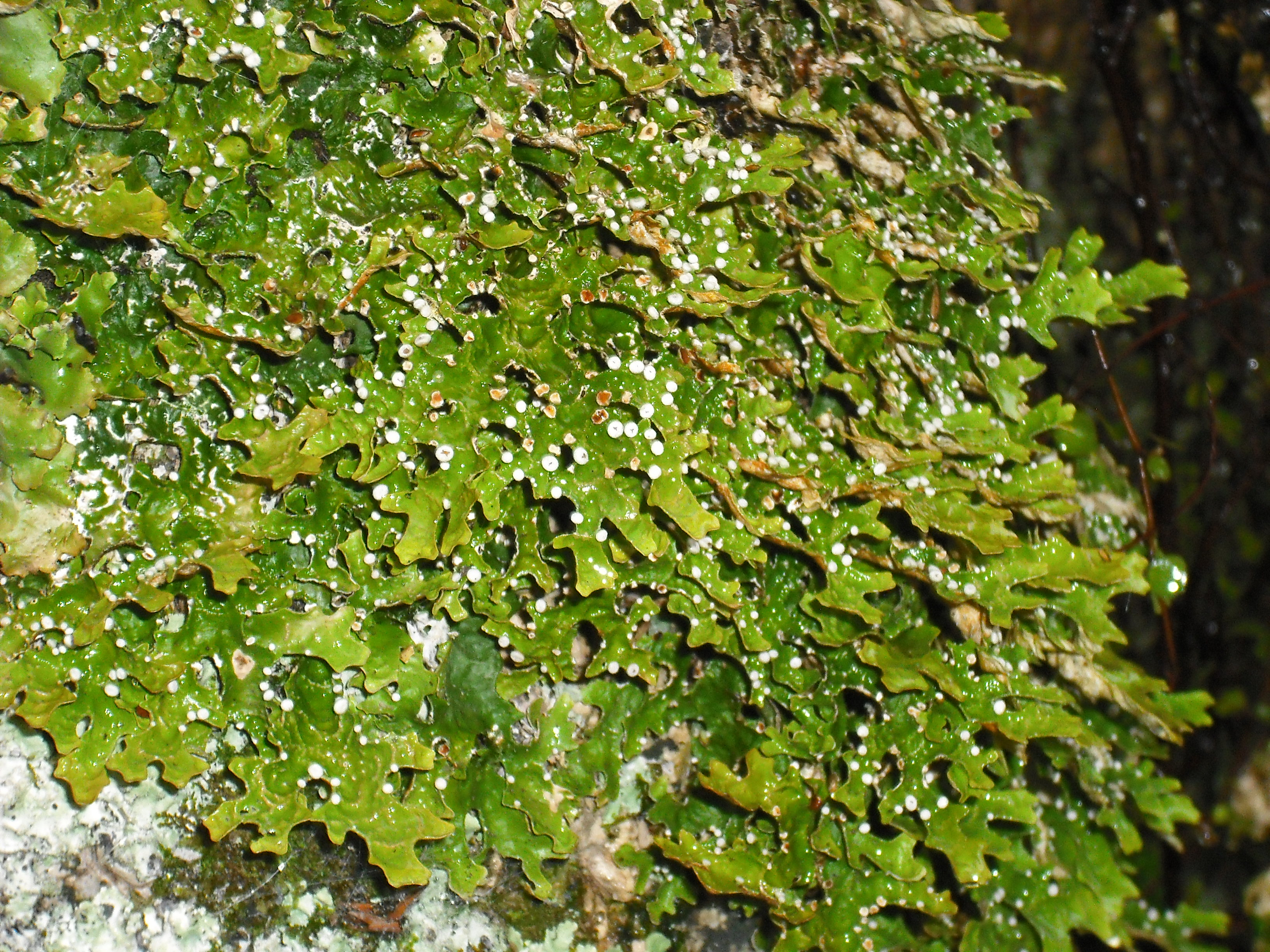

Scientific classification
- Kingdom: Fungi
- Division: Ascomycota
- Class: Lecanoromycetes
- Order: Peltigerales
- Family: Peltigeraceae
- Genus: Pseudocyphellaria
- Species: P. carpoloma

Binomial name
- Pseudocyphellaria carpoloma (Delise) Vain. (1898)

Synonyms
- Sticta carpoloma Delise (1822); Stictina carpoloma (Delise) Nyl. (1860); Saccardoa carpoloma (Delise) Trevis. (1869); Cyanisticta carpoloma (Delise) Gyeln. (1931)

= Pseudocyphellaria carpoloma =

Species of lichen

Pseudocyphellaria carpoloma is a species of corticolous (bark-dwelling), foliose lichen in the family Peltigeraceae. It is found in New Zealand, most commonly in northern coastal forest, but also on the west coast of South Island, on Stewart Island, and in the Kermadec Islands. The bright green upper surface, dichotomously branching nature of its lobes, as well as the yellow pseudocyphellae on the lobe margins and lower surface are characteristics that distinguish it from other New Zealand species in genus Pseudocyphellaria, such as P. billardierii, P. faveolata and P. rufovirescens.

== Taxonomy ==
The lichen was first described as a new species in 1822 by French lichenologist Dominique François Delise, as Sticta carpoloma. The type specimens were collected from Bay of Islands in North Auckland Peninsula, from collections of Jules Dumont d'Urville or René Lesson made during the voyage of the Coquille, a French exploration vessel later named Astrolabe. Edvard August Vainio transferred the taxon to the genus Pseudocyphellaria in 1898.

== Description ==
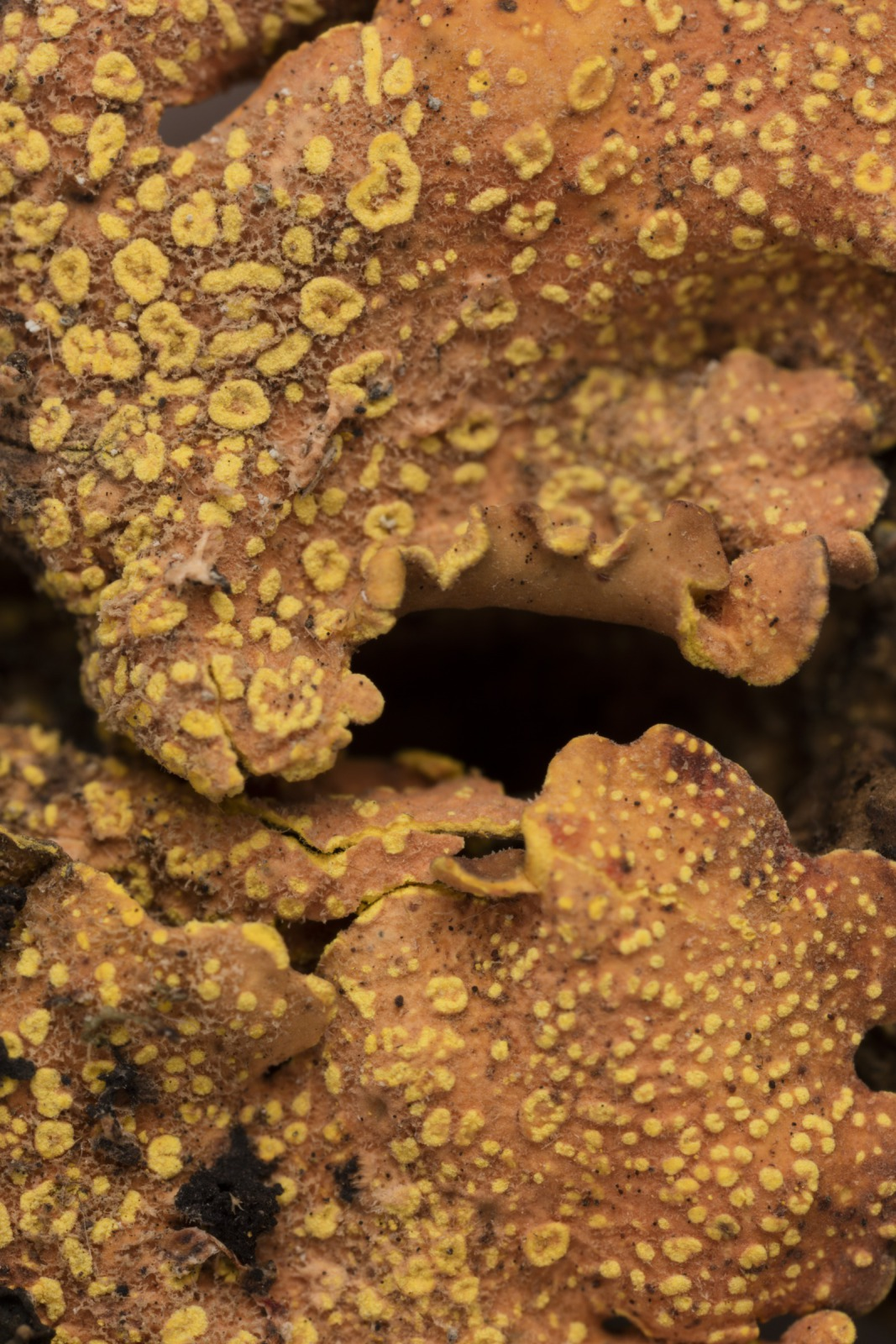
Herbarium specimen showing detail of yellow pseudocyphellae

The thallus of Pseudocyphellaria carpoloma has a diameter ranging between 50 and 500 mm. This lichen presents itself in vast, sprawling arrays that resemble a loosely tangled growth. The lobes of the lichen, measuring between 30–80 mm by 10–70 mm, have a distinct branching pattern – their formation subtly reminiscent of a dichotomy. Their margins are intact and delicately underlined with a yellow, wart-like structure known as pseudocyphellae.

The lobes, when observed closely, display an array of colours. From a vivid lettuce-green or olive-green when wet to a pale greyish-green when dry, they often carry brownish undertones, particularly towards their tips. The lobes are strongly faveolate, meaning they have pits or depressions, giving the surface a somewhat dimpled appearance. The lichen does not produce isidia, phyllidia, maculae, or soredia–asexual reproductive propagules present in some other members of the genus.

Pseudocyphellaria carpoloma has a white medulla (the inner layer), and it possesses a photobiont (photosynthesising partner), the green algal species Chlorella sphaerica. The lower surface ranges from a pale yellow margin to a buff, brownish or dark red-brown central region. This surface features a noticeable rim and has a silky, bullate (blistered) texture that transitions to a slight hairiness towards the centre.

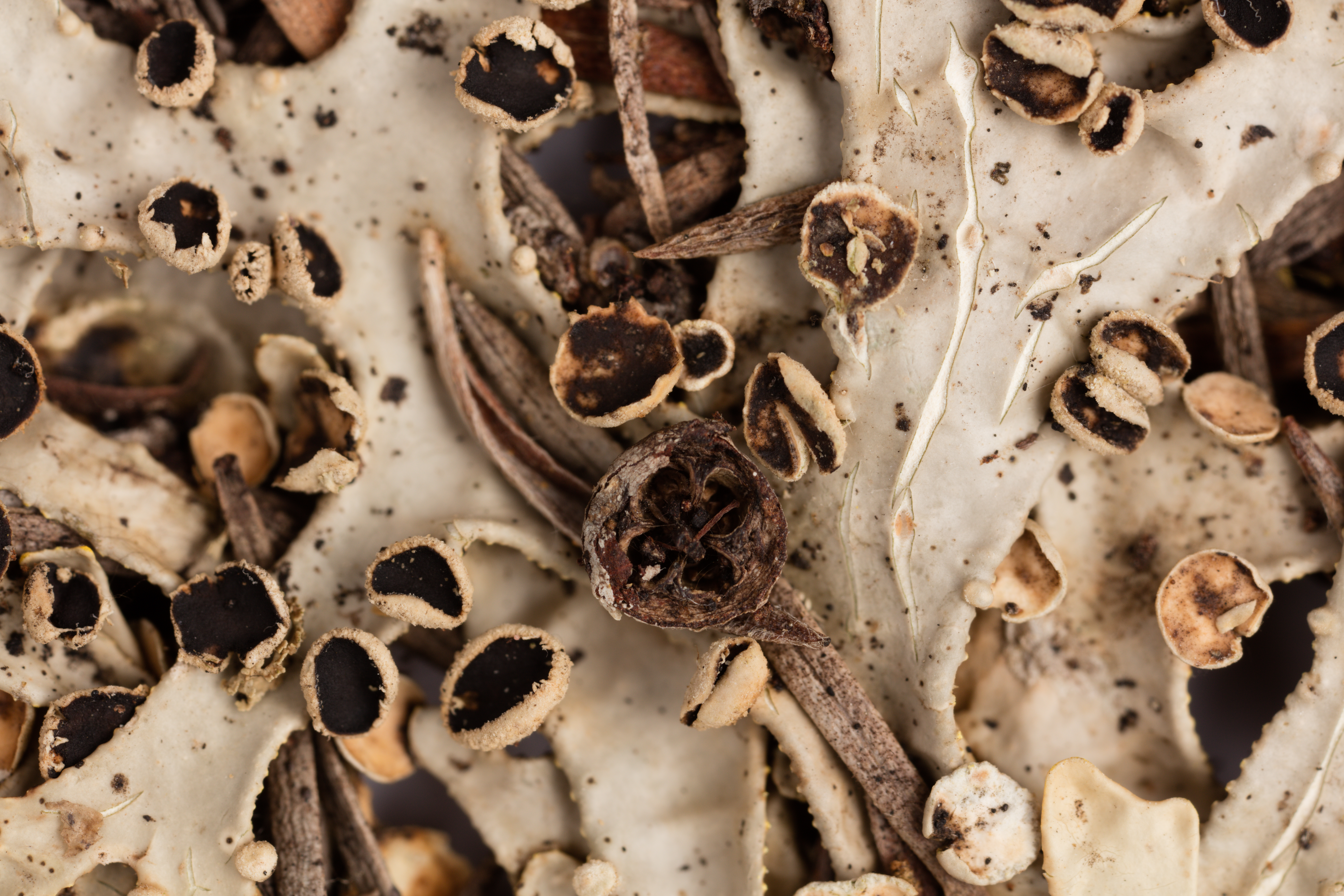
Close-up view of herbarium specimen showing detail of apothecia and upper surface

The pseudocyphellae on this surface are less than 0.1 mm in diameter, scattered, wart-like, and adorn the ridges of the lichen. Minute pycnidia (asexual reproductive structures) are spread across the upper surface, appearing as small, dome-like swellings with a minute, red-brown or black apical pore encircled by a pale zone.

The apothecia (fruiting bodies) of Pseudocyphellaria carpoloma are marginal and have a matt disc that ranges from a pale to dark red-brown when wet and turns black when dry. The outer rim of the apothecium, the exciple, is pale pink or whitish and has a rough texture.

The asci (spore-producing structures) are cylindrical to clavate in shape and measure between 70–85 by 12–16 μm. The ascospores are grey-brown, oval-ellipsoid and have a thickened septum – a central partition. Upon maturation, the septum divides to form three sections, with the entire ascospore typically measuring between 22–25 and 7–11 μm.

== Chemistry ==
Pseudocyphellaria carpoloma contains several lichen products of various chemical classes, including the depsides methyl evernate, tenuiorin, methyl lecanorate, methyl gyrophorate; the triterpenoid, hopane derivatives hopane-7-beta,22-diol and hopane-6-alpha; the depsidones stictic acid, cryptostictic acid and constictic acid; and the pigments pulvinic dilactone, calycin, and pulvinic acid. The lichen additionally contains several carotenoids, the most predominant of which is lutein.

== Habitat and distribution ==
Pseudocyphellaria carpoloma occurs in New Zealand, most commonly in northern coastal forest, but also on the west coast of South Island, on Stewart Island, and in the Kermadec Islands. It has been recorded growing on the trunk of the endemic palm tree Rhopalostylis sapida.
