= Lopharia crassa =

Scientific classification
- Domain: Eukaryota
- Kingdom: Fungi
- Division: Basidiomycota
- Class: Agaricomycetes
- Order: Polyporales
- Family: Polyporaceae
- Genus: Lopharia
- Species: L. crassa

Binomial name
- Lopharia crassa (Lév.) Boidin, (1959)

Synonyms
- Corticium murinum Kalchbr., (1880); Corticium vinosum (Berk.) Sacc., (1845); Gloeocystidium intermedium (Massee) Rick, (1934); Hjortstamia crassa (Lév.) Boidin & Gilles, (2003); Hymenochaete crassa (Lév.) Berk., (1880); Hymenochaete kwangensis Henn., (1907); Hymenochaete multispinulosa Peck, (1882); Hymenochaete scabriseta Cooke, (1883); Hymenochaete umbrina (Berk. & M.A. Curtis) Cooke, (1880); Hymenochaete vinosa (Berk.) Cooke, (1880); Laxitextum crassum (Lév.) Lentz, (1955); Lloydella scabriseta (Cooke) Höhn. & Litsch., (1906); Lloydella umbrina (Berk. & M.A. Curtis) S. Ito, (1955); Lloydella vinosa (Berk.) Bres., (1916); Lopharia vinosa (Berk.) G. Cunn., (1956); Peniophora intermedia Massee, (1889); Peniophora vinosa (Berk.) Massee, (1889); Phanerochaete crassa (Lév.) Burds., (1985); Porostereum crassum (Lév.) Hjortstam & Ryvarden, (1990); Stereum crassum (Lév.) Fr., (1851); Stereum umbrinum Berk. & M.A. Curtis, (1873); Thelephora crassa Lév., (1844); Thelephora vinosa Berk., (1845)

Species of fungus

Lopharia crassa is a plant pathogen.
