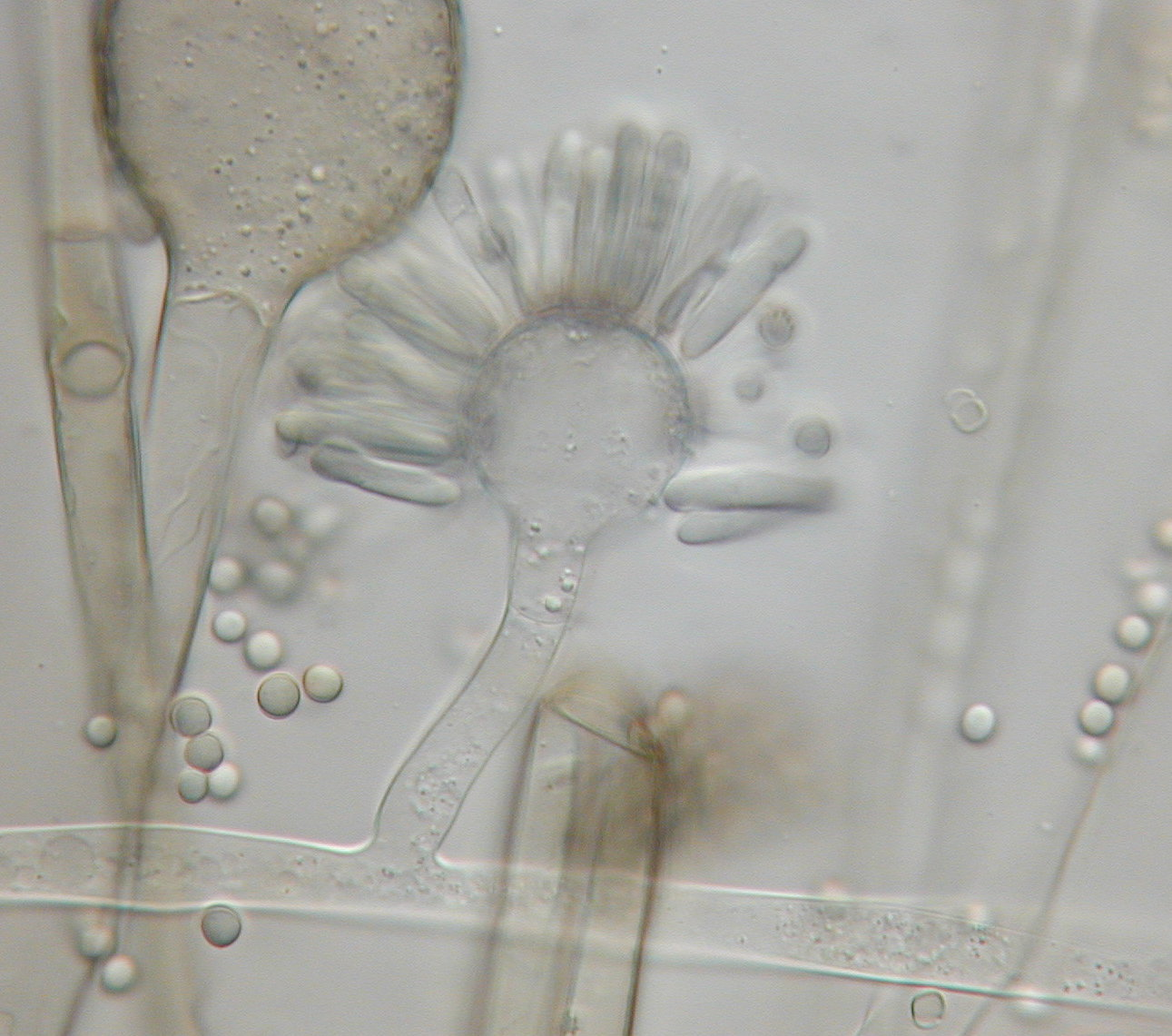

Scientific classification
- Kingdom: Fungi
- Division: Mucoromycota
- Class: Mucoromycetes
- Order: Mucorales
- Family: Syncephalastraceae
- Genus: Syncephalastrum
- Species: S. racemosum

Binomial name
- Syncephalastrum racemosum Cohn ex J. Schröt.

= Syncephalastrum racemosum =

Species of fungus

Syncephalastrum racemosum is a species of filamentous fungi.

== Clinical significance ==
This species has been reported cause nail disease, especially in damaged nails. S. racemosum has been proposed as associated with Alzheimer's disease, though this work has been heavily criticized for methodological issues.
