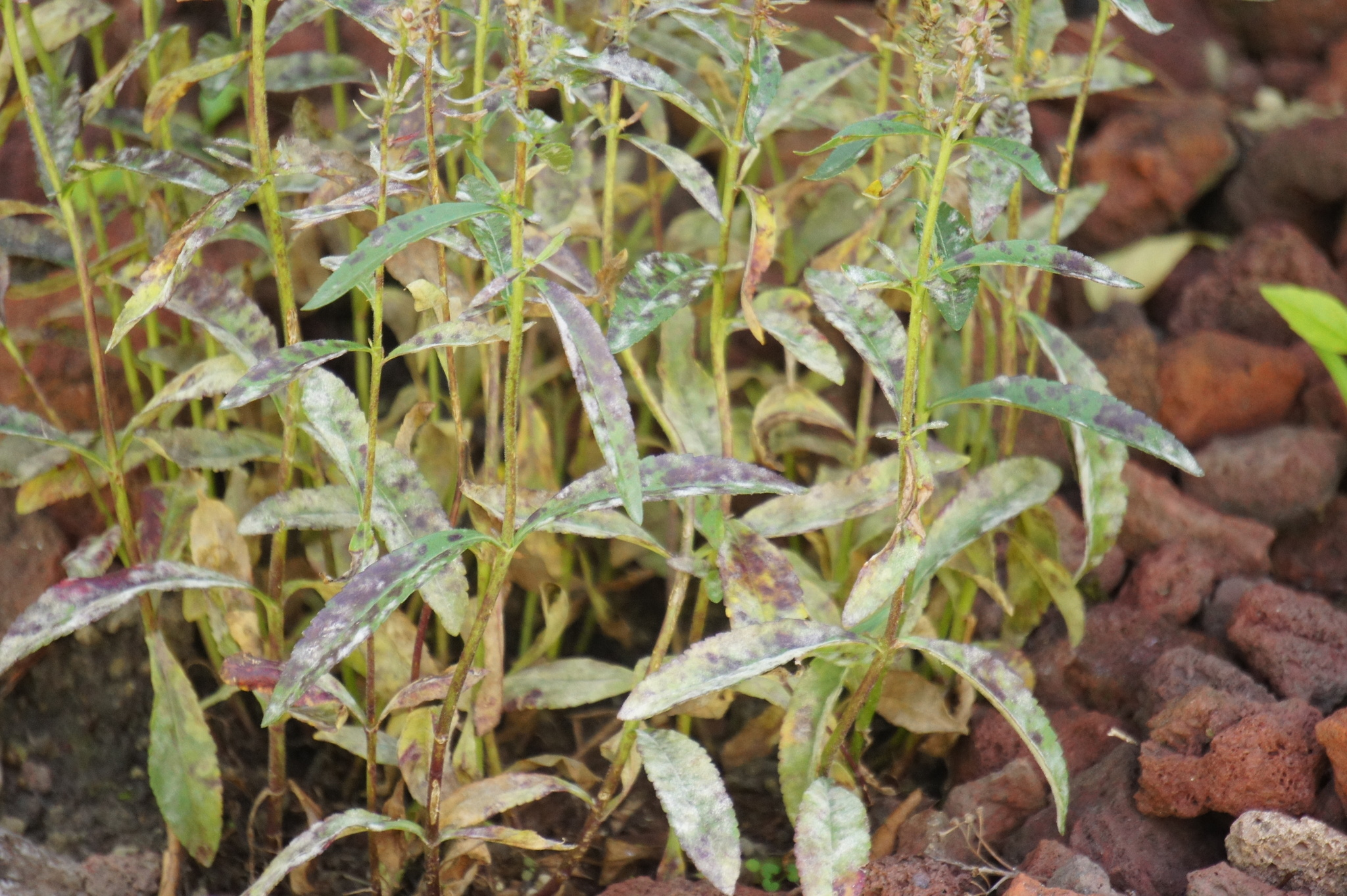
- Podosphaera fuliginea on Veronica in Canada.

Scientific classification
- Kingdom: Fungi
- Division: Ascomycota
- Class: Leotiomycetes
- Order: Erysiphales
- Family: Erysiphaceae
- Genus: Podosphaera
- Species: P. fuliginea

Binomial name
- Podosphaera fuliginea (Schltdl.) U. Braun & S. Takamatsu, 2000

Synonyms
- Alphitomorpha fuliginea Schltdl., 1819; Erysibe fuliginea (Schltdl.) Link, 1824; Erysiphe fuliginea (Schltdl.) Fr., 1829; Sphaerotheca fuliginea (Schltdl.) Poll., 1905; Podosphaera major (Juel) S. Bumer, 1933; Alphitomorpha fumosa Wallr., 1833; Erysiphe fumosa (Wallr.) Sacc., 1882; Sphaerotheca castagnei var. veronicae Rabenh., 1866; Sphaerotheca castagnei var. veronicae-longifoliae Thüm., 1881

= Podosphaera fuliginea =

Species of fungus

Podosphaera fuliginea is a species of powdery mildew in the family Erysiphaceae. It is found in North America and Eurasia, where it affects plants in the genus Veronica.

== Description ==
The fungus forms effuse or dense patches on host leaves, sometimes thick, white and patchy. Podosphaera fuliginea, like most Erysiphaceae, is highly host-specific and infects only Veronica.

== Taxonomy ==
The fungus was formally described in 1819 by Schlechtendal with the basionym Alphitomorpha fuliginea. It was transferred to the genus Podosphaera by Uwe Braun and Susumu Takamatsu in 2000. It was once applied to a broad host range but is now known to be confined to a single genus. Many of its former hosts now host the Podosphaera xanthii complex.
