= Systremma =

Scientific classification
- Domain: Eukaryota
- Kingdom: Animalia
- Phylum: Arthropoda
- Class: Insecta
- Order: Lepidoptera
- Superfamily: Noctuoidea
- Family: Erebidae
- Subfamily: Calpinae
- Genus: Systremma; Herrich-Schäffer, [1858]

Genus of moths

Systremma is a genus of moths of the family Erebidae. The genus was erected by Gottlieb August Wilhelm Herrich-Schäffer in 1858.

== Species ==
- Systremma crassicornis Herrich-Schäffer, [1858] Brazil (Rio de Janeiro)
- Systremma ennomodes Hampson, 1926 Colombia
- Systremma peruviensis (Dognin, 1912) Peru, Ecuador
