= Anekabeeja =

Scientific classification
- Kingdom: Fungi
- Division: Ascomycota
- Class: Sordariomycetes
- Order: Microascales
- Family: Microascaceae
- Genus: Anekabeeja; Udaiyan & Hosag.

Genus of fungi

Anekabeeja is a genus of fungi in the family Microascaceae.
