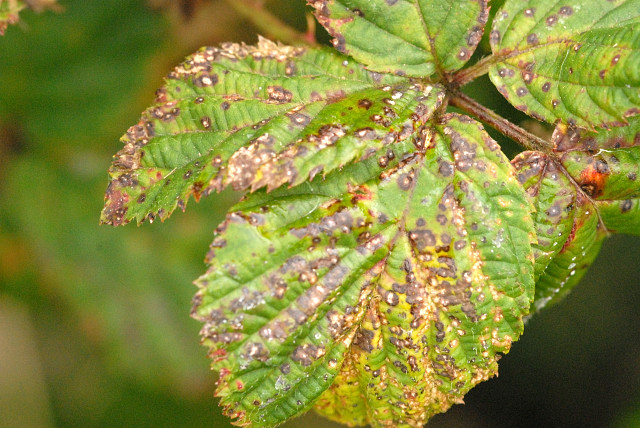

Scientific classification
- Kingdom: Fungi
- Division: Ascomycota
- Class: Sordariomycetes
- Order: Amphisphaeriales
- Family: Amphisphaeriaceae
- Genus: Coryneopsis
- Species: C. rubi

Binomial name
- Coryneopsis rubi (Westend.) Grove, (1937)

Synonyms
- Leptocoryneum rubi (Westend.) N.F. Buchw., (1958); Septoria rubi Westend.,(1854)

= Coryneopsis rubi =

Species of fungus

Coryneopsis rubi is a plant pathogen.
