= Schinzinia =

Scientific classification
- Kingdom: Fungi
- Division: Basidiomycota
- Class: Agaricomycetes
- Order: Agaricales
- Family: Agaricaceae
- Genus: Schinzinia; Fayod (1889)

Type species
- Schinzinia pustulosa Fayod (1889)

Genus of fungi

Schinzinia is a fungal genus in the family Agaricaceae. It is a monotypic genus, containing the single species Schinzinia pustulosa Fayod. The genus and the species were circumscribed by Victor Fayod in Ann. Sci. Nat. Bot. ser.7, vol.9 on page 365 in 1889.

The genus name of Schinzinia is in honour of Hans Schinz (1858–1941), who was a Swiss explorer and botanist and was a native of Zürich.

== See also ==
- List of Agaricaceae genera
- List of Agaricales genera
