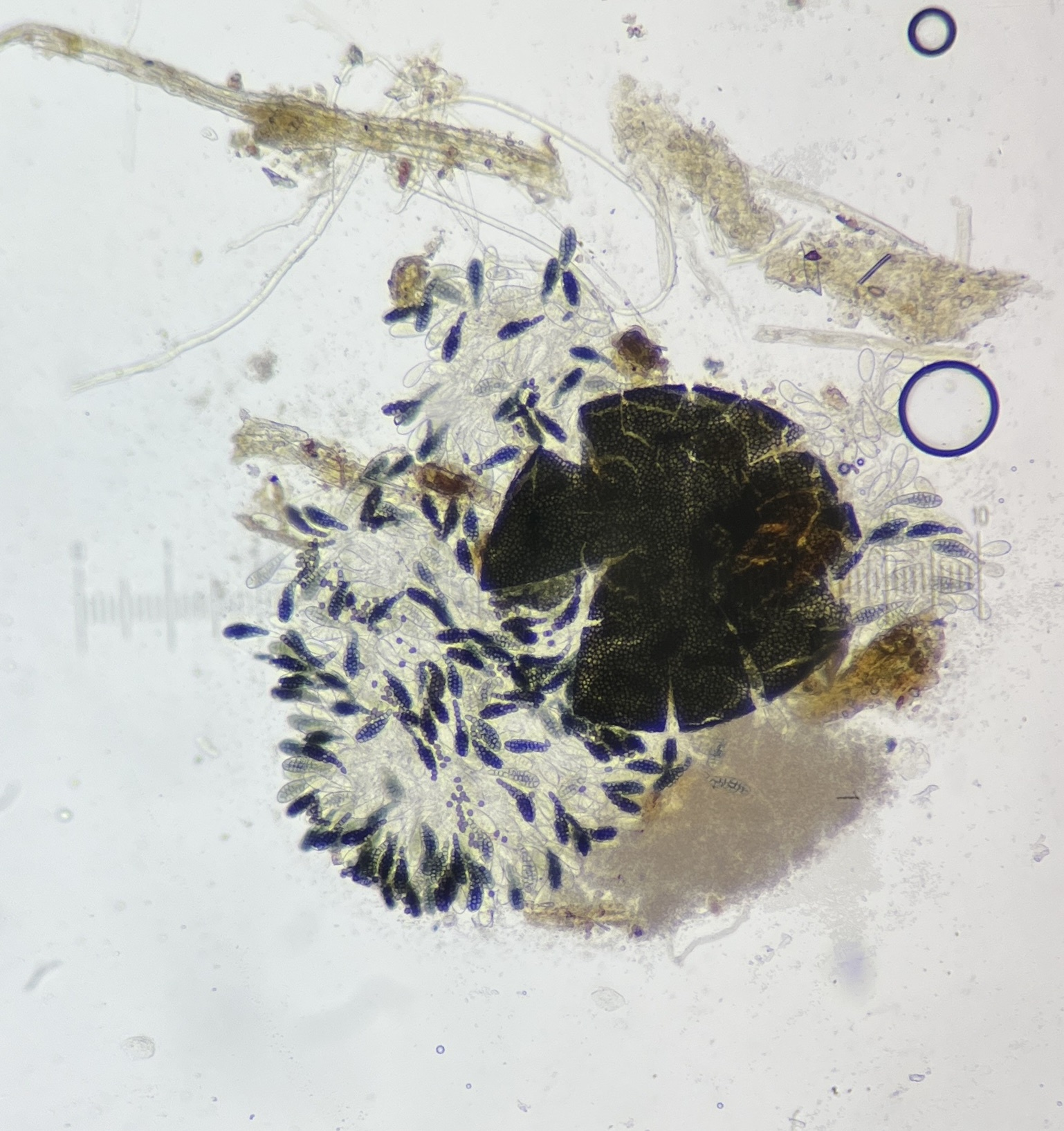
- Preussia typharum

Scientific classification
- Kingdom: Fungi
- Division: Ascomycota
- Class: Dothideomycetes
- Order: Pleosporales
- Family: Sporormiaceae
- Genus: Preussia; Fuckel (1867)

Type species
- Preussia funiculata (Preuss) Fuckel (1870)

= Preussia (fungus) =

Genus of fungi

Preussia is a genus of fungi in the family Sporormiaceae. The widespread genus contains 51 species that grow on dung or in the soil.

The genus name of Preussia is in honour of Carl Gottlieb Traugott Preuss (1795–1855), who was a German (Prussian) botanist (Algology and Mykology) and Apothecary. He was from 1834 - 1855 an Apothecary in Hoyerswerda.

The genus was circumscribed by Karl Wilhelm Gottlieb Leopold Fuckel in Hedwigia vol.6 on page 175 in 1867 and previously in Linnaea vol.24 on page 143 in 1851.

== Species ==
As accepted by Species Fungorum;

- Preussia aemulans (Rehm) Arx (1973)
- Preussia africana Arenal, Platas & Peláez (2005)
- Preussia alloiomera (S.I. Ahmed & Cain) Kruys (2009)
- Preussia alpina N. Lundq. & Kruys (2015)
- Preussia americana (Griffiths) Guarro (1997)
- Preussia antarctica (Speg.) J.H. Chang & Y.Z. Wang (2009)
- Preussia aquilirostrata Guarro, Abdullah, Gené & Al-Saadoon (1997)
- Preussia bipartis (Cain) Kruys (2009)
- Preussia borealis (I. Egeland) Kruys (2009)
- Preussia calomera (S.I. Ahmed & Cain) Abdullah & Guarro (1999)
- Preussia citrullina R.M.F. Silva, R.J.V. Oliveira, Souza-Motta, J.L. Bezerra & G.A. Silva, (2018)
- Preussia clavispora Guarro (1990)
- Preussia commutata (Niessl) Abdullah & Guarro (1999)
- Preussia constricta Guarro, Al-Saadoon & Abdullah (1997)
- Preussia cymatomera (S.I. Ahmed & Cain) Soláns (1985
- Preussia dubia (S.I. Ahmed & Cain) Kruys (2009)
- Preussia flanaganii Boylan (1970)
- Preussia fleischhakii (Auersw.) Cain (1961)
- Preussia funiculata (Preuss) Fuckel (1870)
- Preussia globosa (J.N. Rai & J.P. Tewari) J.N. Rai & J.P. Tewari (1963)
- Preussia hexaphragmia Guarro, Al-Saadoon & Abdullah (1997)
- Preussia immersa (Zukal) J.H. Chang & Y.Z. Wang (2009)
- Preussia inaequalis (S.I. Ahmed & Asad) S. Ahmad (1979)
- Preussia isabellae Arenal, Platas & Peláez (2005)
- Preussia isomera Cain (1961)
- Preussia lasiocarpa (Lorenzo) Guarro & Gené (1997)
- Preussia lignicola (W. Phillips & Plowr.) Kruys (2009)
- Preussia longispora (Cain) Valldos. & Guarro (1990)
- Preussia longisporopsis (S.I. Ahmed & Cain) Kruys (2009)
- Preussia mediterranea Arenal, Platas & Peláez (2007)
- Preussia minipascua (S.I. Ahmed & Cain) J.H. Chang & Y.Z. Wang (2009)
- Preussia minipolymera J.H. Chang & Y.Z. Wang (2009)
- Preussia obliqua (R.S. Khan & Cain) J.C. Krug & R.S. Khan (1991)
- Preussia octocylindrospora N. Lundq. & Kruys (2015)
- Preussia octomera (Auersw.) Kruys (2009)
- Preussia peltigerae (Brackel) Diederich (2018)
- Preussia persica Asgari & Zare (2010)
- Preussia polymorpha (Cain) Abdullah & Guarro (1999)
- Preussia pyriformis (Speg.) Guarro (1997)
- Preussia quattuordecimcellularis (P. Welt, N. Heine & H. Friese) J.H. Chang & Y.Z. Wang (2009)
- Preussia scandinavica (I. Egeland) Guarro (1997)
- Preussia splendens (Cain) Kruys (2009)
- Preussia sultanii (Sultana & Malik) Guarro (1997)
- Preussia systenospora (S.I. Ahmed & Cain) Soláns (1985)
- Preussia tenerifae (Arx & Guarro) Kruys (2009)
- Preussia terricola Cain (1961)
- Preussia tetramera (S.I. Ahmed & Cain) Kruys (2009)
- Preussia typharum (Sacc.) Cain (1961)
- Preussia variispora Abdullah, Al-Saadoon & Guarro (1999)
- Preussia vulgaris (Corda) Cain (1961)
