= George Perkins Clinton =

American plant pathologist (1867–1937)

- Born: May 7, 1867; Polo, Illinois
- Died: August 13, 1937 (aged 70); New Haven, Connecticut
- Education: University of Illinois; Harvard University
- Awards: National Academy of Sciences; American Academy of Arts and Sciences; American Association for the Advancement of Science
- Scientific career
- Fields: Botany, mycology, plant pathology
- Workplaces: Connecticut Agricultural Experiment Station; Yale University

George Perkins Clinton (7 May 1867 – 13 August 1937) was an American botanist, mycologist, and plant pathologist whose career focused on plant diseases, fungal pathology, and agricultural entomology. He worked for thirty-five years at the Connecticut Agricultural Experiment Station at New Haven.

== Early life and education ==
Clinton was born on May 7, 1867 to John Waterbury Clinton and Caroline Perkins in Polo, Illinois. After earning a B.S. from the University of Illinois in 1890, he received a MS in Botany form the same institution in 1894. Subsequently, he pursued graduate studies at Harvard University, receiving an M.S. and D.Sc. from Harvard in 1901 and 1902, respectively.

== Career ==
In 1902, he joined the Connecticut Agricultural Experiment Station in New Haven as a botanist, also serving on the Connecticut State Board of Agriculture and chairing the Committee on Fungous Diseases of the Connecticut Pomological Society. His work included investigations of coffee diseases in Puerto Rico and studies of the brown-tail and gypsy moths in Japan for the U.S. Department of Agriculture. He later served as a lecturer in forest pathology at Yale University from 1915 to 1927 and as a research associate in botany there from 1926 to 1929.

He was an authority on fungal plant diseases, particularly those caused by Ustilagineae (commonly known as the smuts) and Pucciniomycetes (commonly known as rusts). He collaborated with Arthur Bliss Seymour and Franklin Sumner Earle editing the exsiccata series Economic fungi, A. B. Seymour and F. S. Earle. Supplement C. Ustilagineae (1903–1905).

He was a fellow of the American Association for the Advancement of Science (elected in 1906), the American Academy of Arts and Sciences (elected in 1914), and the National Academy of Sciences (elected in 1930).

The standard author abbreviation G.P.Clinton is used to indicate this person as the author when citing a botanical name.

== Personal life and death ==
Clinton married Anna J. Lightbody of Pekin, Illinois, on August 9, 1892. Their son, Harry Lightbody Clinton, was born on July 14, 1893 and was killed in battle during World War I on September 30, 1918. Clinton retired on July 1, 1937 from the Connecticut Agricultural Experiment Station after thirty-five years of service. He died a few weeks later, on August 13, 1937 in New Haven, Connecticut.
