= Tubercularia lateritia =

Scientific classification
- Domain: Eukaryota
- Kingdom: Fungi
- Division: Ascomycota
- Class: Sordariomycetes
- Order: Hypocreales
- Family: Nectriaceae
- Genus: Tubercularia
- Species: T. lateritia

Binomial name
- Tubercularia lateritia (Berk.) Seifert (1985)

Synonyms
- Stilbella cinnabarina (Mont.) Wollenw. Stilbum cinnabarinum Mont., Annls Sci. Nat., Bot., sér. 2 8: 360 (1837); Stilbum lateritium Berk., Ann. Mag. nat. Hist., Ser. 1 4: 291 (1840)

Species of fungus

Tubercularia lateritia is a fungal saprobe or plant pathogen that sometimes infects avocados and macadamia trees. It grows mostly on decaying bark and rotting wood in tropical countries. It is an asexual fungus (anamorph) and is correctly known by the different name used for its sexual state (teleomorph), Nectria pseudotrichia. The asexual state and sexual state are often, but not always, found together.

== See also ==
- List of avocado diseases
