= Sporormia =

Scientific classification
- Kingdom: Fungi
- Division: Ascomycota
- Class: Dothideomycetes
- Order: Pleosporales
- Family: Sporormiaceae
- Genus: Sporormia; De Not.

Type species
- Sporormia fimetaria De Not.

Genus of fungi

Sporormia is a genus of fungi in the family Sporormiaceae and part of the phylum Ascomycota. It is morphologically distinct from other genera in this family due to the orientation of cylindrical ascospores contained in a gelatinous sheath within the asci of the fruitbody. It is mostly known for being coprophilous but known to utilize wood as a substrate as well.

== Species List ==
As of 2024, 30 species within the Sporormia genera were recognized by the Global Biodiversity Information Facility. This list is alphabetized.

-S. articulata

-S. brassicae

-S. carpinea

-S. chrysospora

-S. deserticola

-S. disjuncta

-S.fimetaria

-S. fimicola

-S. globosa

-S. leguminosa

-S. leptosphaerioides

-S. longipes

-S. marchaliana

-S. millingtoniae

-S. mirabilis

-S. nepalensis

-S. notarisii

-S. octoloculata

-S. ourasca

-S. pentamera

-S. pithyophila

-S. promiscua

-S. pulchra

-S. reticosa

-S. roumeguerei

-S. subticinensis

-S. transvaalensis

-S. tuberculata

-S. ulmicola

-S. variabilis
