= Sporisorium =

Scientific classification
- Kingdom: Fungi
- Division: Basidiomycota
- Class: Ustilaginomycetes
- Order: Ustilaginales
- Family: Ustilaginaceae
- Genus: Sporisorium; Ehrenb. ex Link, in Link, Linné’s Species Plantarum, Ed. 4, 6, 2: 86. 1825 emend. McTaggart & R.G. Shivas

Type species
- Sporisorium sorghi Ehrenb. ex Link, in Willdenow, Willd., Sp. Pl., ed, 4, 6, 2: 86. 1825.

Species
- See text

Synonyms
- Endothlaspis Sorokīn, 1884; Lundquistia Vánky, 2001

Genus of fungi

Sporisorium is a fungus genus in the Ustilaginaceae family.
