= Skin conditions in instrumental musicians =

The intense contact between a musical instrument and skin may exaggerate existing skin conditions or cause new skin conditions. Skin conditions like hyperhidrosis, lichen planus, psoriasis, eczema, and urticaria may be caused in instrumental musicians due to occupational exposure and stress. Allergic contact dermatitis and irritant contact dermatitis are the most common skin conditions seen in string musicians.

== Allergic contact dermatitis ==
Rosin, the material commonly used to wax string instruments is known to cause allergic contact dermatitis in musicians. Nickel, a metal found in musical instruments causes allergic contact dermatitis on the fingers and hands of string instrumentalists and in the lip and neck of wind instrumentalists. Wind instrumentalists with lip and neck infection should switch to silver, gold or plastic mouthpieces if allergic dermatitis occurs. (R)-4-methoxydalbergione present in rosewood may cause allergic contact dermatitis in violinists. Cane reed (causing cheilitis in saxophone players), propolis (a wax used to close structural gaps in musical instruments), paraphenylenediamine (used to polish musical instruments) and potassium dichromate (tanning agent to the skin of the harp) also cause allergic contact dermatitis in musicians.

== Irritant contact dermatitis ==
- Fiddler's neck - It is seen in violinists due to non-eczematous irritant contact. Lichenification and hyperpigmentation can be seen. It is different from classical irritant contact dermatitis because the etiology is multifactorial : friction (leading to lichenification), local pressure, shearing stress and occlusion. Viola players are more pre-disposed to this condition because of the larger size of the instrument.
- Cellist's chest and cellist's knee - It is seen in cello players due to the irritant contact of the instrument.
- Flautist's chin - Irritant contact dermatitis seen in the chin of a wood/brass instrumentalist.
- Clarinetist's cheilitis - Chelitis in a clarinet player. Caused due to friction, pressure, stress and occlusion.

== Skin trauma ==
Frequent, chronic contact of instruments to skin may make it callous by the thickening of stratum corneum. Use of 'thumb position' in cellists may cause callosity of left thumb. Garrod's pads are seen on the dorsal left second and third fingers over the proximal interphalangeal joints in violinists. Drummer's digit is the callosity seen on the lateral phalanx of the left finger. Callosities need treatment only when they are excessive or symptomatic. Harpist's finger is a cutaneous condition caused by repetitive playing of the harp.
