= Garrod's pad =

- Other names: Violinist's pads
- Specialty: Dermatology

Garrod's pads, also known as violinist's pads, are a cutaneous condition characterized by calluses on the dorsal aspect of the interphalangeal joints, i.e. the back side of the finger joints. They are often seen in violin, viola, and cello players, along with fiddler's neck and other dermatologic conditions peculiar to string musicians. Although Garrod's pads are conventionally described as appearing on the proximal interphalangeal joint, distal interphalangeal joint involvement has also been described.

Garrod's pads are named after Archibald Garrod who first documented them in 1904 in association with Dupuytren's contracture. H.A. Bird described them as an incidental finding in a professional violinist and proposed that they arise in such cases due to repeated extreme tension of the extensor tendons over the interphalangeal joints. Bird noted that violin players use the left hand for a markedly different task than the right hand, with the extensor tendons in the left hand subjected to considerable tension, and that Garrod's pads only arise on the left hand in such cases. This unilateral finding differentiates the occupational hazard of Garrod's pads from more significant disorders. Among violinists and violists, Garrod's pads apparently arise as a protective mechanism for the skin and subcutaneous tissues above the tendons; Bird notes that they do not protect against external trauma unlike most calluses.

Patients with Dupuytren's contracture are four times more likely to have coexisting Garrod's pads.

== See also ==
- Knuckle pads
- Harpist's finger
- Fiddler's neck
- Cellist's chest
- List of eponymously named medical signs
