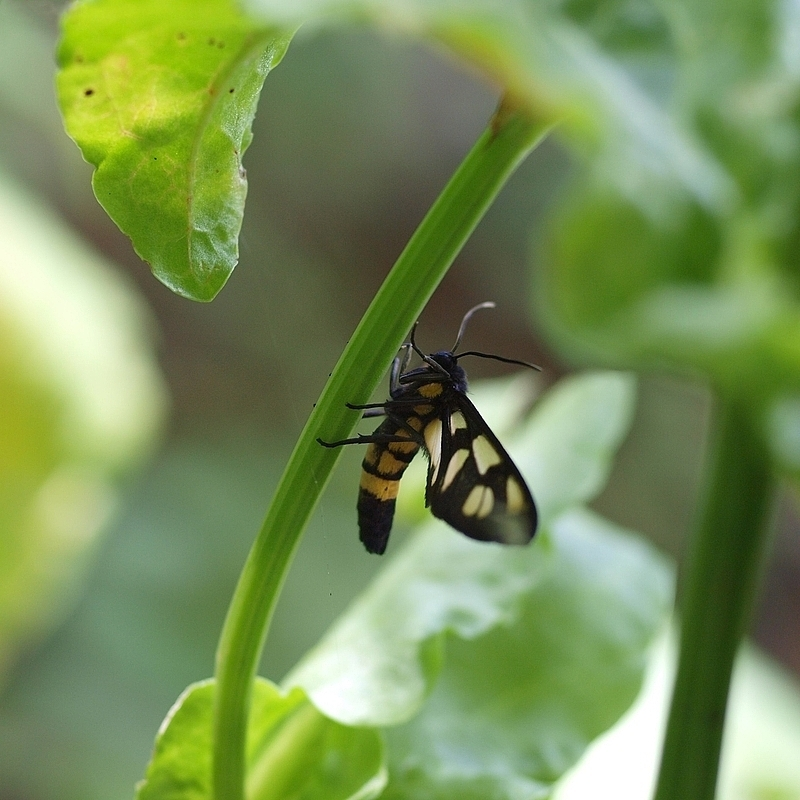

Scientific classification
- Domain: Eukaryota
- Kingdom: Animalia
- Phylum: Arthropoda
- Class: Insecta
- Order: Lepidoptera
- Superfamily: Noctuoidea
- Family: Erebidae
- Subfamily: Arctiinae
- Genus: Amata
- Species: A. fortunei

Binomial name
- Amata fortunei (d'Orza, 1869)

Synonyms
- Syntomis fortunei d'Orza, 1869; Syntomis erebina Butler, 1881

= Amata fortunei =

White-spotted moth

Species of moth

Amata fortunei, the white-spotted moth, is a moth of the family Erebidae. The species was first described by d'Orza in 1869. It is found in Japan, South Korea and Taiwan.

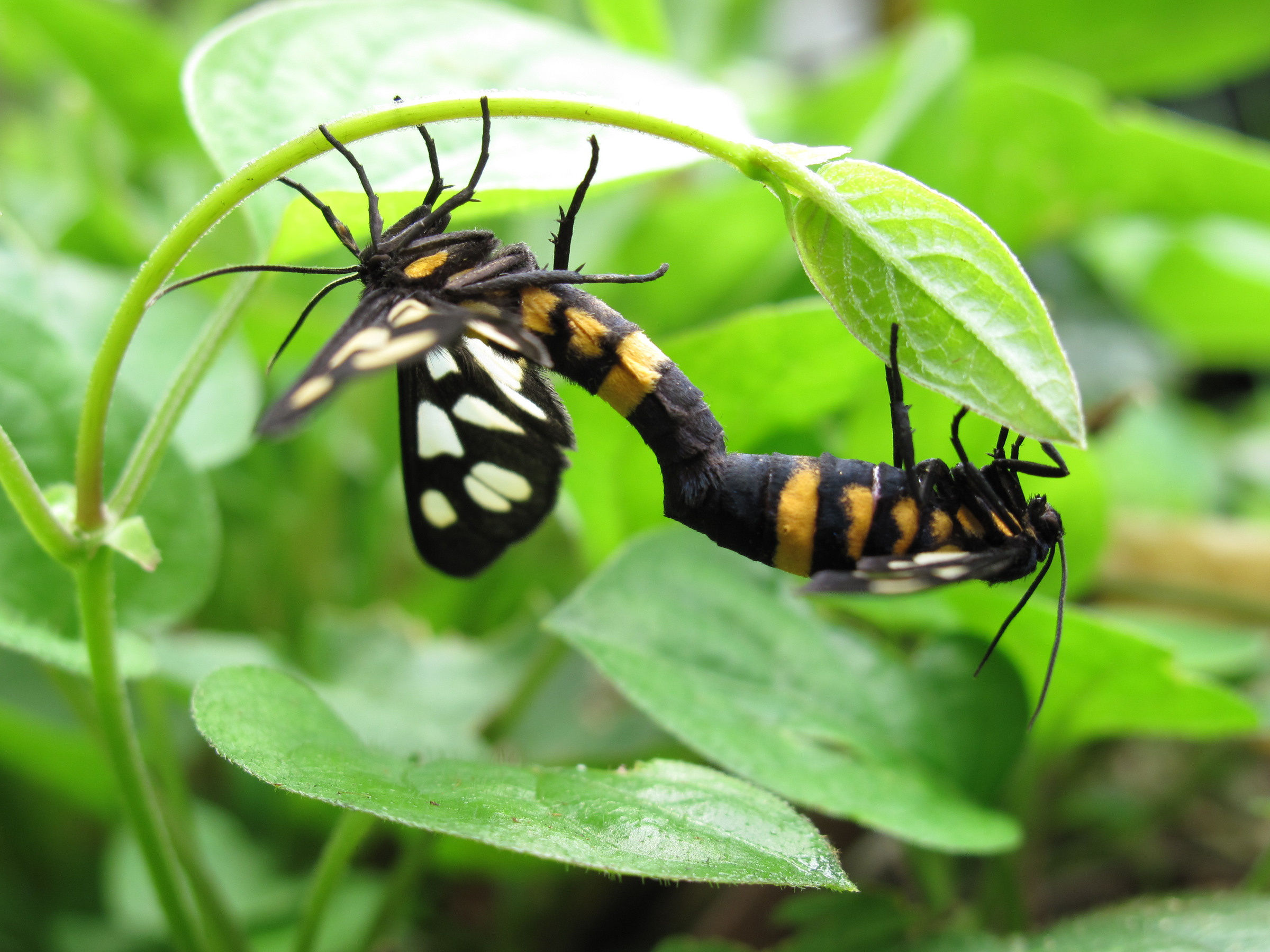
Mating

The wingspan is 30–37 mm. It is a day-flying species. There are two generations per year, with adults on wing from early June to mid July and again from mid August to mid September.

The larvae feed on the leaves of Trifolium repens, Taraxacum species, Equisetum arvense and Typha angustifolia. They are known to eat dead leaves as well as living tissue.

== Subspecies ==
- Amata fortunei fortunei (Japan)
- Amata fortunei matsumurai (Sonan, 1941) (Taiwan)
