= S. citri =

S. citri may refer to:

- Septoria citri, a fungal plant pathogen
- Spiroplasma citri, a bacterium species and the causative agent of Citrus stubborn disease
