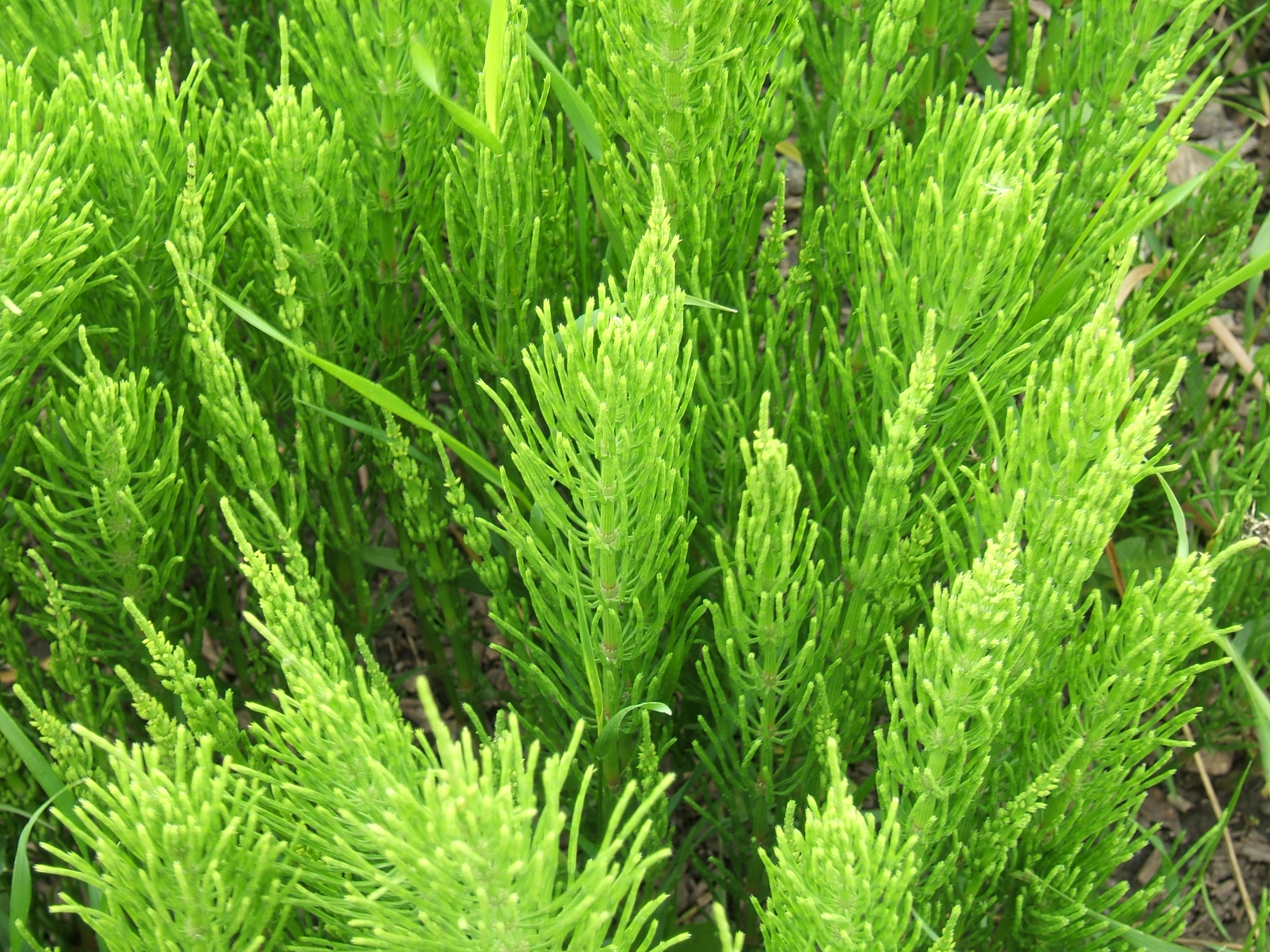
- Photosynthetic summer branches

Conservation status
- Least Concern (IUCN 3.1)

- Secure (NatureServe)

Scientific classification
- Kingdom: Plantae
- Clade: Tracheophytes
- Division: Polypodiophyta
- Class: Polypodiopsida
- Subclass: Equisetidae
- Order: Equisetales
- Family: Equisetaceae
- Genus: Equisetum
- Subgenus: E. subg. Equisetum
- Species: E. arvense

Binomial name
- Equisetum arvense L.

Synonyms
- Allosites arvense Brogn.; Equisetum arvense fo. arcticum (Rupr.) M. Broun; Equisetum arvense fo. boreale (Bong.) Klinge; Equisetum arvense fo. campestre (Schultz) Klinge; Equisetum arvense fo. ramulosum (Rupr.) Klinge ex Scoggan; Equisetum arvense subsp. boreale (Bong.) Á. Löve; Equisetum arvense subsp. ramulosum (Rupr.) W.F. Rapp; Equisetum arvense var. arcticum Rupr.; Equisetum arvense var. campestre (Schultz) Rupr.; Equisetum arvense var. ramulosum Rupr.; Equisetum boreale Bong.; Equisetum calderi B. Boivin; Equisetum campestre Schultz; Equisetum saxicola Suksd.

= Equisetum arvense =

Species of horsetail

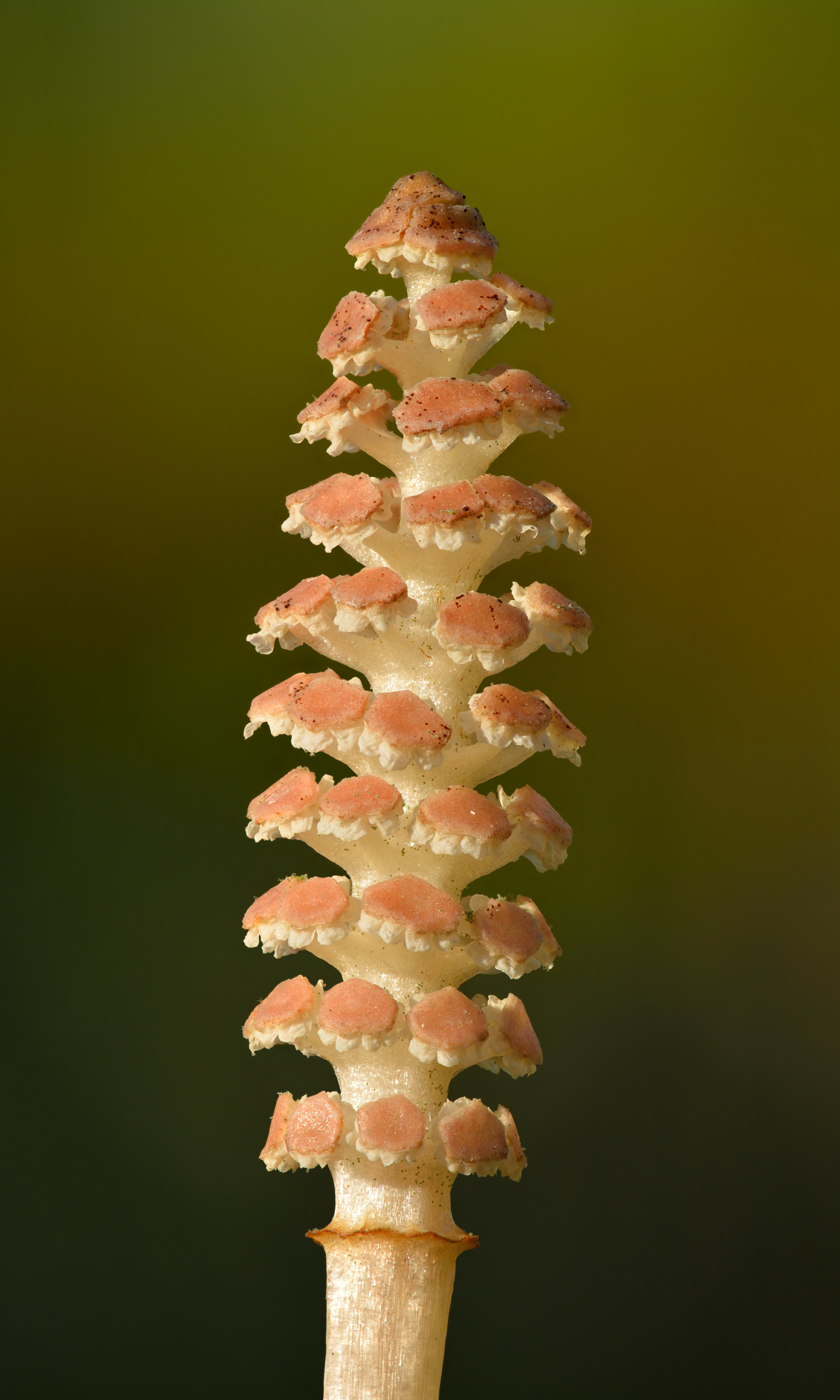
Fertile shoot

Equisetum arvense, commonly known as field horsetail or common horsetail, is a species of vascular plant in the horsetail family Equisetaceae. Like all horsetails, it is a type of fern. It is native throughout the arctic and temperate regions of the Northern Hemisphere. It has two distinct growth forms, a fertile spore-bearing stem and a sterile green stem. It is sometimes confused with mare's tail, Hippuris vulgaris.

== Description ==
Equisetum arvense is a perennial herbaceous plant that spreads by means of an underground rhizome. The slender, felted rhizome freely forks and bears stem tubers. The species is dimorphic, that is, it exhibits two distinct growth forms, both arising from the same rhizome. Fertile spore-bearing stems begin to appear in April. After shedding its spores, a fertile stem promptly withers and dies. Sterile green stems appear around the same time but last throughout the summer until the first frosts of autumn.

The erect or prostrate sterile stems are 10–90 cm (3.9–35.4 in) tall and 3–5 mm (0.12–0.20 in) diameter, with jointed segments around 2–5 cm (0.79–1.97 in) long with whorls of side shoots at the segment joints; the side shoots have a diameter of about 1 mm (0.039 in). Some stems can have as many as 20 segments. The solid and simple branches are ascending or spreading, with sheaths that bear attenuate teeth. The off-white fertile stems are of a succulent texture, 10–25 cm (3.9–9.8 in) tall and 3–5 mm (0.12–0.20 in) diameter, with 4–8 whorls of brown scale leaves and an apical brown spore cone. The cone is 10–40 mm (0.39–1.57 in) long and 4–9 mm (0.16–0.35 in) broad. The fertile stems are typically precocious and appear in early spring. It has changed little from its ancestors of the Carboniferous period.

E. arvense is a nonflowering plant, multiplying through spores. It absorbs silicon from the soil, which is rare among herbs. It has a very high diploid number of 216 (108 pairs of chromosomes).

== Taxonomy ==
Linnaeus described field horsetail with the binomial Equisetum arvense in his Species Plantarum of 1753. The specific epithet arvense is from the Latin "arvum", meaning "arable land", referring to the growth of the plant in arable soil or disturbed areas. The common name "common horsetail" references the appearance of the plant that when bunched together appears similar to a horse's tail.

Many species of horsetail have been described and subsequently synonymized with E. arvense. One of these is E. calderi, a small form described from Arctic North America.

=== Names ===
Some other common names include bottle-brush, devil's-guts, foxtail-rush, horse pipes, horsetail fern, meadow-pine, pine-grass, and snake-grass. It is also known as marestail, primarily in the UK, but this common name is also used for the flowering aquatic plant Hippuris vulgaris and the common North American weed Erigeron canadensis.

== Distribution and habitat ==
Equisetum arvense grows in a wide range of conditions, in temperatures less than 5 °C (41 °F) to greater than 20 °C (68 °F) and in areas that receive annual rainfall as low as 100 mm (3.9 in) and as great as 2,000 mm (79 in). It commonly occurs in damp and open woodlands, pastures, arable lands, roadsides, disturbed areas, and near the edge of streams. It prefers neutral or slightly basic clay loams that are sandy or silty, especially where the water table is high, though it can occur occasionally on slightly acid soils.

The plant is widespread in the Northern Hemisphere, growing as far as 83° North in North America and 71° North in Norway, Sweden, Finland, and Russia and as far south as Texas, India and Iran. It is less widespread in the Southern Hemisphere, but it occurs in Argentina, Brazil, Chile, Madagascar, Indonesia, and Australia. It was introduced into New Zealand in the 1920s where it was identified as an invasive species by Ella Orr Campbell in 1949. It is listed on the National Pest Plant Accord, prohibiting its sale, spread and cultivation.

== Toxicity ==
Equisetum arvense is toxic to livestock, particularly horses. It is difficult to control due to its extensive underground rhizomes, which can penetrate the soil up to 6 feet (1.8 m) deep. Fire, mowing, or slashing are ineffective since new stems quickly grow from the rhizomes. Some herbicides remove aerial growth but regrowth quickly occurs albeit with a reduction in frond density.

== Uses ==
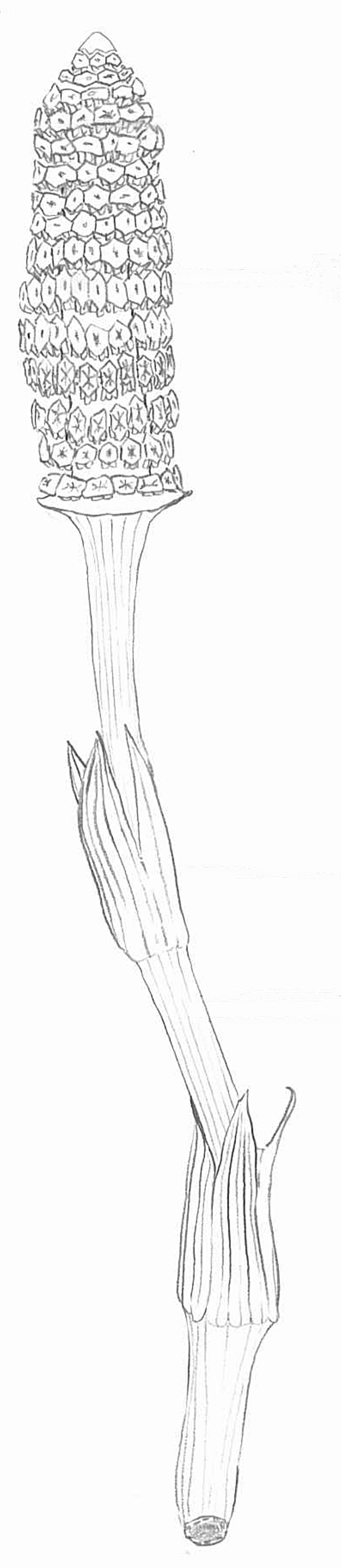
Drawing of a fertile stem of E. arvense, 10 cm as drawn. At the top is the strobilus, which consists of the axis (inside) and 15–20 horizontal circles of about 20 sporangiophores. Lower on the stem are two sheaths of merged microphylls. The stem has many strong lengthwise ridges.

=== Medicine ===
The plant contains several substances that can be used medicinally. It is rich in silicon (2-3%), potassium, calcium, manganese, magnesium and phosphorus, phytosterols, dietary fiber, vitamins A, E and C, tannins, alkaloids, saponins, flavonoids, glycosides and caffeic acid phenolic ester. The buds are eaten as a vegetable in Japan and Korea in spring. All other Equisetum species are toxic. In polluted conditions, it may synthesize nicotine.

Recent research has shown limited evidence of anti-inflammatory, diuretic, antimicrobial, and antioxidant properties.

=== Craft production ===
It was also once used to polish pewter and wood (gaining the name pewterwort) and to strengthen fingernails. It is also an abrasive. It was used by hurdy-gurdy players to dress the wheels of their instruments by removing resin build up.

=== Horticultural and agricultural ===
In horticulture and agriculture, an aqueous extract of E. arvense has been approved for use as a fungicide in the European Union and the United Kingdom (since Brexit). Horsetail extract can be used to prevent fungal pathogens on crops including:

- Damping off (Pythium) and powdery mildew on cucumbers.
- Various fungal diseases of fruit trees, including scab (Venturia inaequalis), mildew, and peach leaf curl (Taphrina deformans).
- Both downy and powdery mildew on grapevines.
- Early blight (Alternaria solani) and Septoria blight (Septoria lycopersici) on tomatoes.
- Grey mould, powdery mildew, red core, and anthracnose fruit rot (Colletotrichum acutatum) in strawberries.
- Early blight, late blight, and powdery mildew on potatoes.

Equisetum is used in biodynamic farming (preparation BD 508) in particular to reduce the effects of excessive water around plants (such as fungal growth). The high silica content of the plant reduces the impact of moisture.

=== Traditional medicine ===
E. arvense has been used in traditional Austrian herbal medicine internally as tea, or externally as baths or compresses, for treatment of disorders of the skin, locomotor system, kidneys and urinary tract, rheumatism and gout.

Externally it was traditionally used for chilblains and wounds.

In Finnish traditional medicine, E. arvense (Finnish: peltokorte) has been especially valued for its high concentration of silicic acid and has been seen to help and been used in a number of ways:

- Green summer shoots, dried, as a remedy.
- Seen as preventing inflammation, strengthening skin and immune system.
- A decoction of E. arvense has been used internally to treat all kinds of lung diseases and externally to treat rashes and hard-to-treat wounds.

In Iran, infusion of its shoots is believed to be a remedy against diabetes and obesity.

== Gallery ==
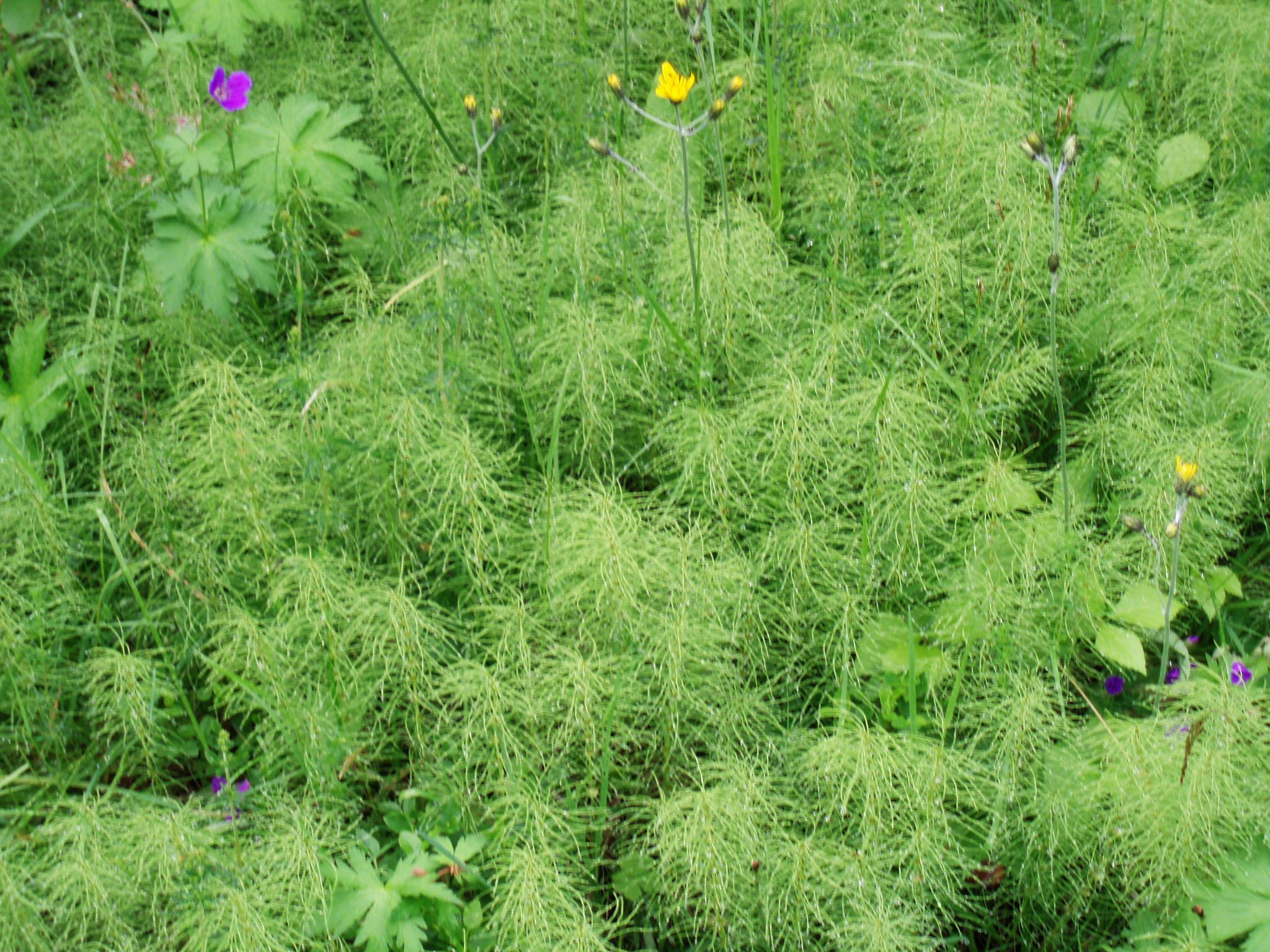
Equisetum arvense in Iceland

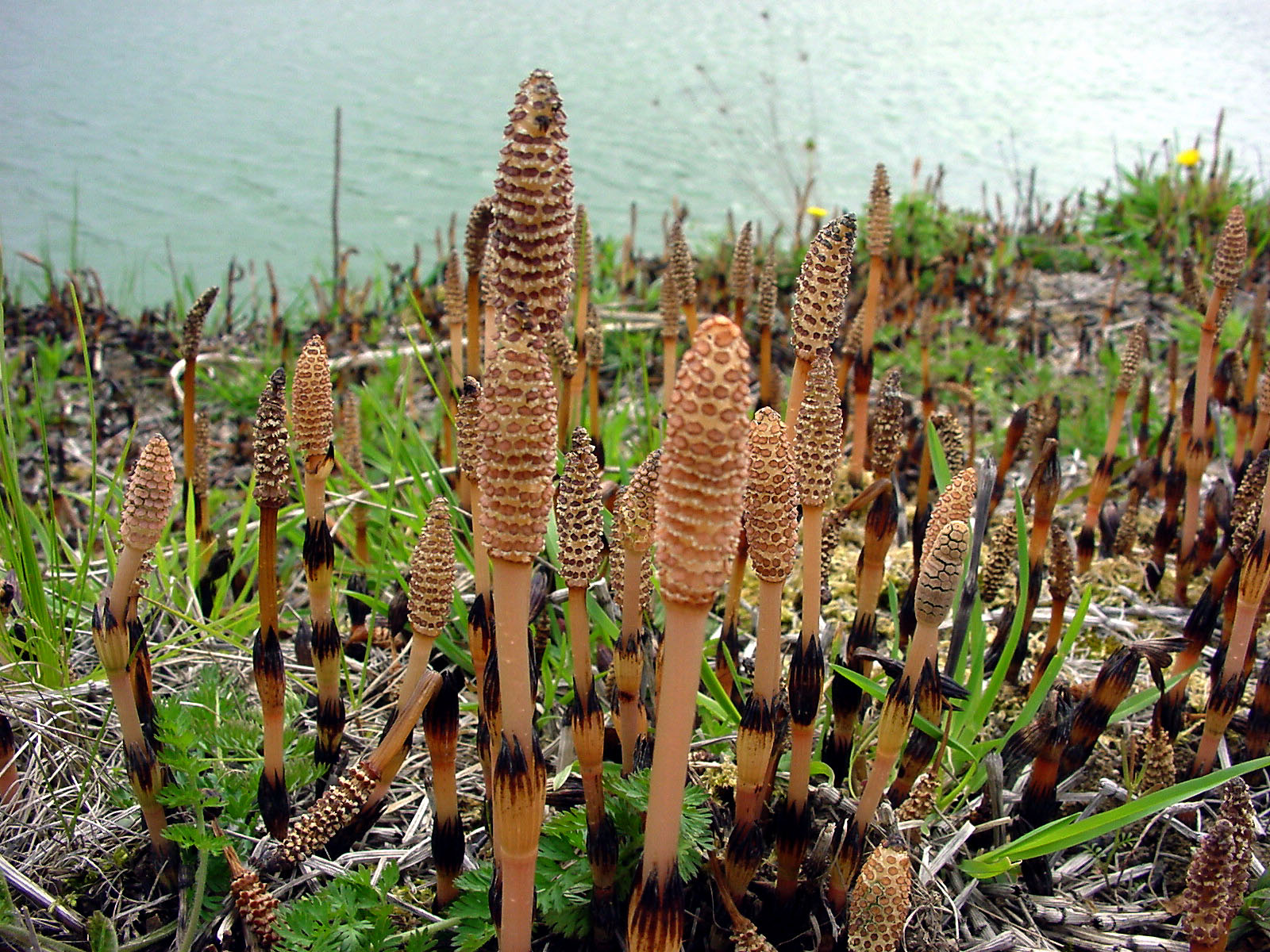
Fertile shoots, in late April

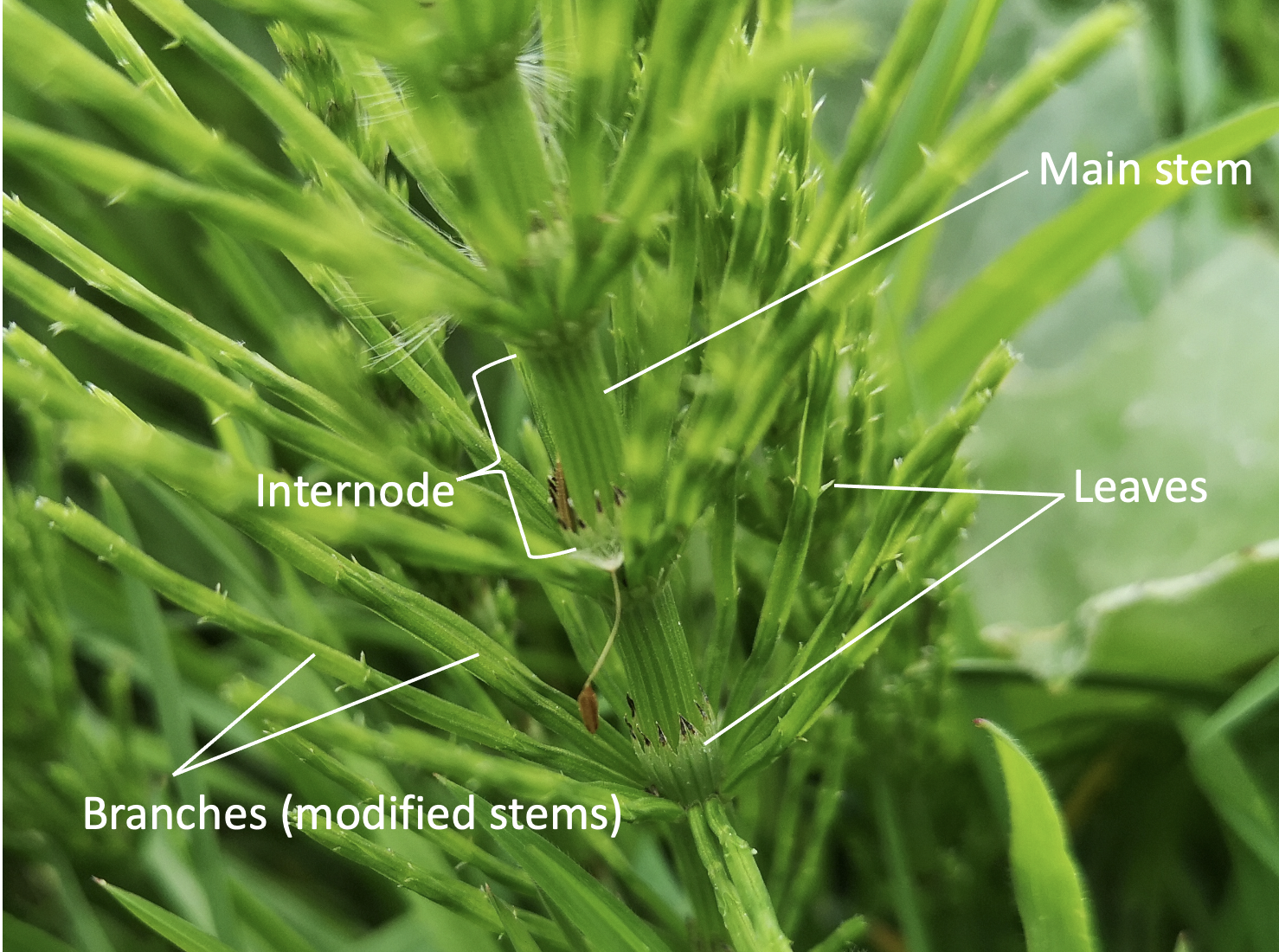
A sterile stem of Equisetum arvense, showing its leaves, stems and internodes

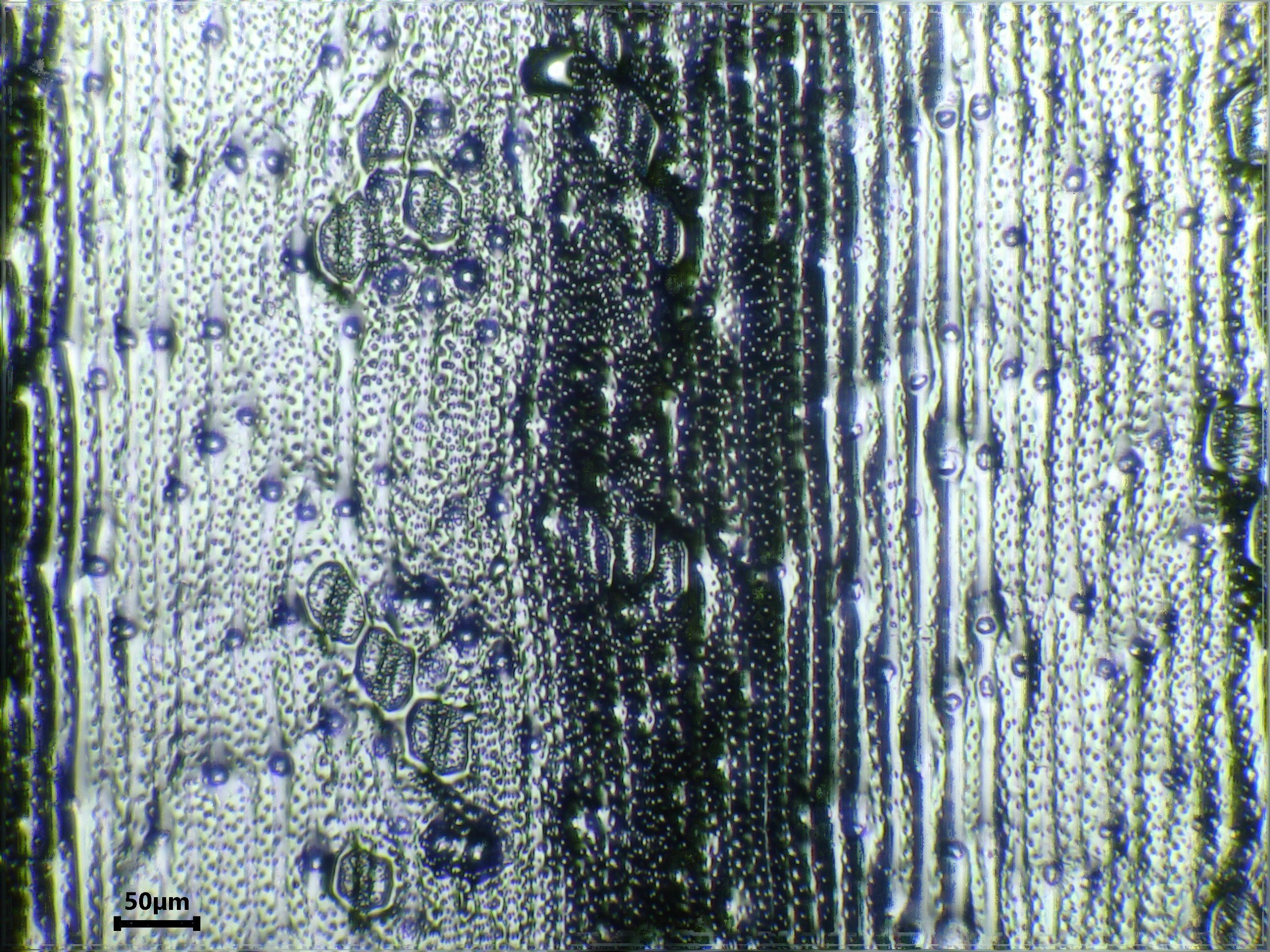
Stem print of Equisetum arvense showing surface structure and stomata, 400x
