= Septoria lactucae =

Scientific classification
- Domain: Eukaryota
- Kingdom: Fungi
- Division: Ascomycota
- Class: Dothideomycetes
- Order: Capnodiales
- Family: Mycosphaerellaceae
- Genus: Septoria
- Species: S. lactucae

Binomial name
- Septoria lactucae Peck

Species of fungus

Septoria lactucae, or lettuce septoria blight, is a pathogenic leaf fungus that is found on lettuce.
