= Septoria selenophomoides =

Scientific classification
- Domain: Eukaryota
- Kingdom: Fungi
- Division: Ascomycota
- Class: Dothideomycetes
- Order: Capnodiales
- Family: Mycosphaerellaceae
- Genus: Septoria
- Species: S. selenophomoides

Binomial name
- Septoria selenophomoides E.K.Cash & A.M.J.Watson (1955)

Species of fungus

Septoria selenophomoides is a fungal plant pathogen infecting orchids. It causes leaf spots, starting with small yellowish lesions on the plant's leaves and darkening to brown or black. If the infection develops further, the leaves and fruit fall from the orchid and spread the infection.
