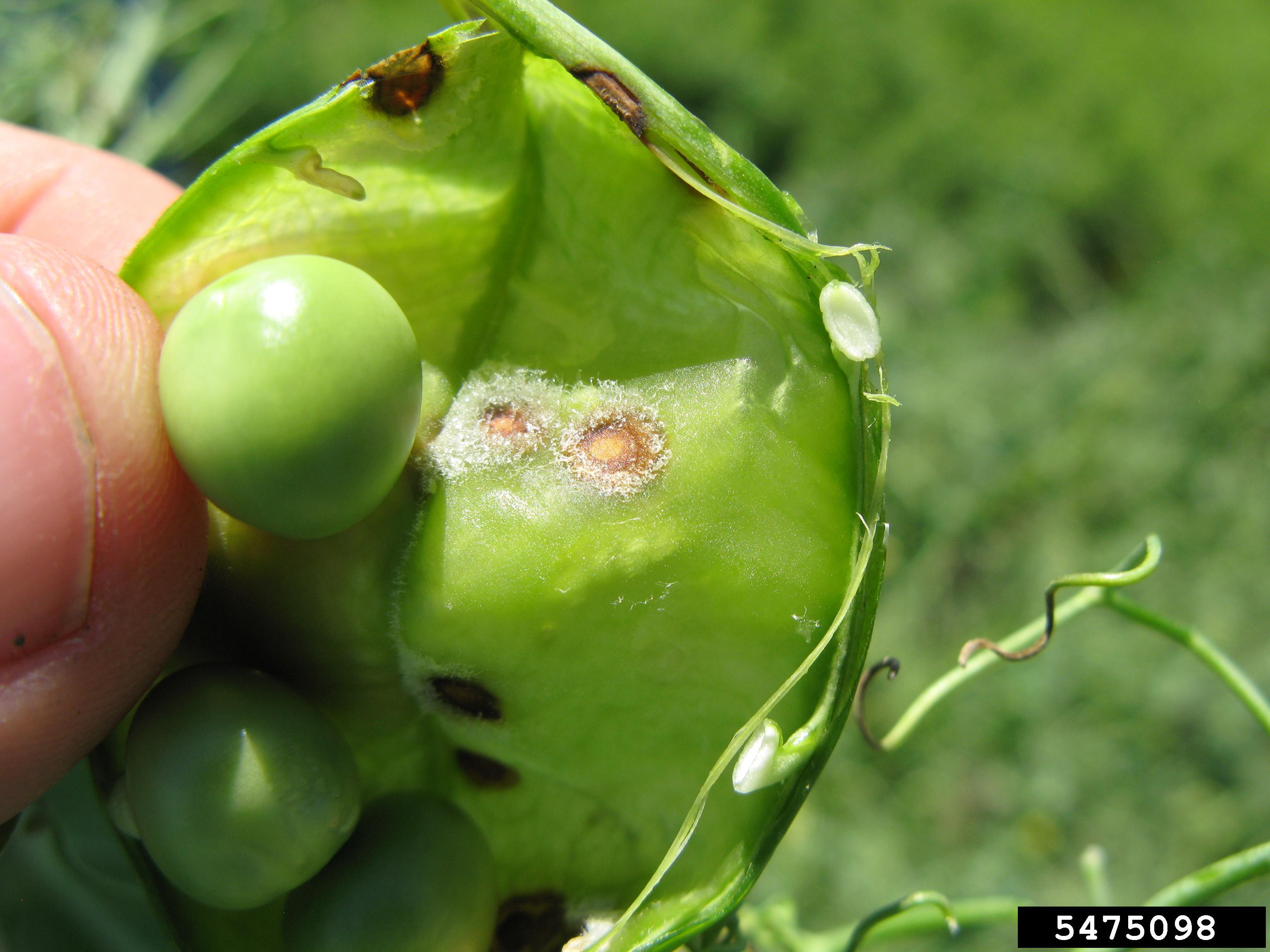

Scientific classification
- Domain: Eukaryota
- Kingdom: Fungi
- Division: Ascomycota
- Class: Dothideomycetes
- Order: Capnodiales
- Family: Mycosphaerellaceae
- Genus: Septoria
- Species: S. pisi

Binomial name
- Septoria pisi Westend. (1857)

= Septoria pisi =

Species of fungus

Septoria pisi is a fungal plant pathogen infecting peas.
