= Septoria helianthi =

Scientific classification
- Domain: Eukaryota
- Kingdom: Fungi
- Division: Ascomycota
- Class: Dothideomycetes
- Order: Capnodiales
- Family: Mycosphaerellaceae
- Genus: Septoria
- Species: S. helianthi

Binomial name
- Septoria helianthi Ellis & Kellerm.

Species of fungus

Septoria helianthi, also known as Septoria leaf spot, is a fungal plant pathogen infecting sunflowers.
