= Septoria azaleae =

Scientific classification
- Domain: Eukaryota
- Kingdom: Fungi
- Division: Ascomycota
- Class: Dothideomycetes
- Order: Capnodiales
- Family: Mycosphaerellaceae
- Genus: Septoria
- Species: S. azaleae

Binomial name
- Septoria azaleae Voglino, (1899)

Species of fungus

Septoria azaleae is a fungal plant pathogen infecting azaleas.
