= Septoria platanifolia =

Scientific classification
- Domain: Eukaryota
- Kingdom: Fungi
- Division: Ascomycota
- Class: Dothideomycetes
- Order: Capnodiales
- Family: Mycosphaerellaceae
- Genus: Septoria
- Species: S. platanifolia

Binomial name
- Septoria platanifolia Cooke (1878)

Species of fungus

Septoria platanifolia is a fungal plant pathogen infecting plane trees. It produces brown, circular spots that go on to develop grey centres with a darker halo.
