= Septoria aciculosa =

Scientific classification
- Domain: Eukaryota
- Kingdom: Fungi
- Division: Ascomycota
- Class: Dothideomycetes
- Order: Capnodiales
- Family: Mycosphaerellaceae
- Genus: Septoria
- Species: S. aciculosa

Binomial name
- Septoria aciculosa Ellis & Everh. (1884)

Species of fungus

Septoria aciculosa is a fungal plant pathogen that can infect strawberries.

This pathogen also affects coniferous trees, particularly those in the pine family (Pinaceae). This fungus is known to cause a specific disease called "needle cast" or "Septoria needle cast."
