= Septoria bataticola =

Scientific classification
- Domain: Eukaryota
- Kingdom: Fungi
- Division: Ascomycota
- Class: Dothideomycetes
- Order: Capnodiales
- Family: Mycosphaerellaceae
- Genus: Septoria
- Species: S. bataticola

Binomial name
- Septoria bataticola Taubenh. (1914)

Species of fungus

Septoria bataticola is a fungal plant pathogen infecting sweet potatoes.
