= Septoria malagutii =

Scientific classification
- Kingdom: Fungi
- Division: Ascomycota
- Class: Dothideomycetes
- Order: Capnodiales
- Family: Mycosphaerellaceae
- Genus: Septoria
- Species: S. malagutii

Binomial name
- Septoria malagutii Ciccar. & Boerema ex E.T. Cline

Species of fungus

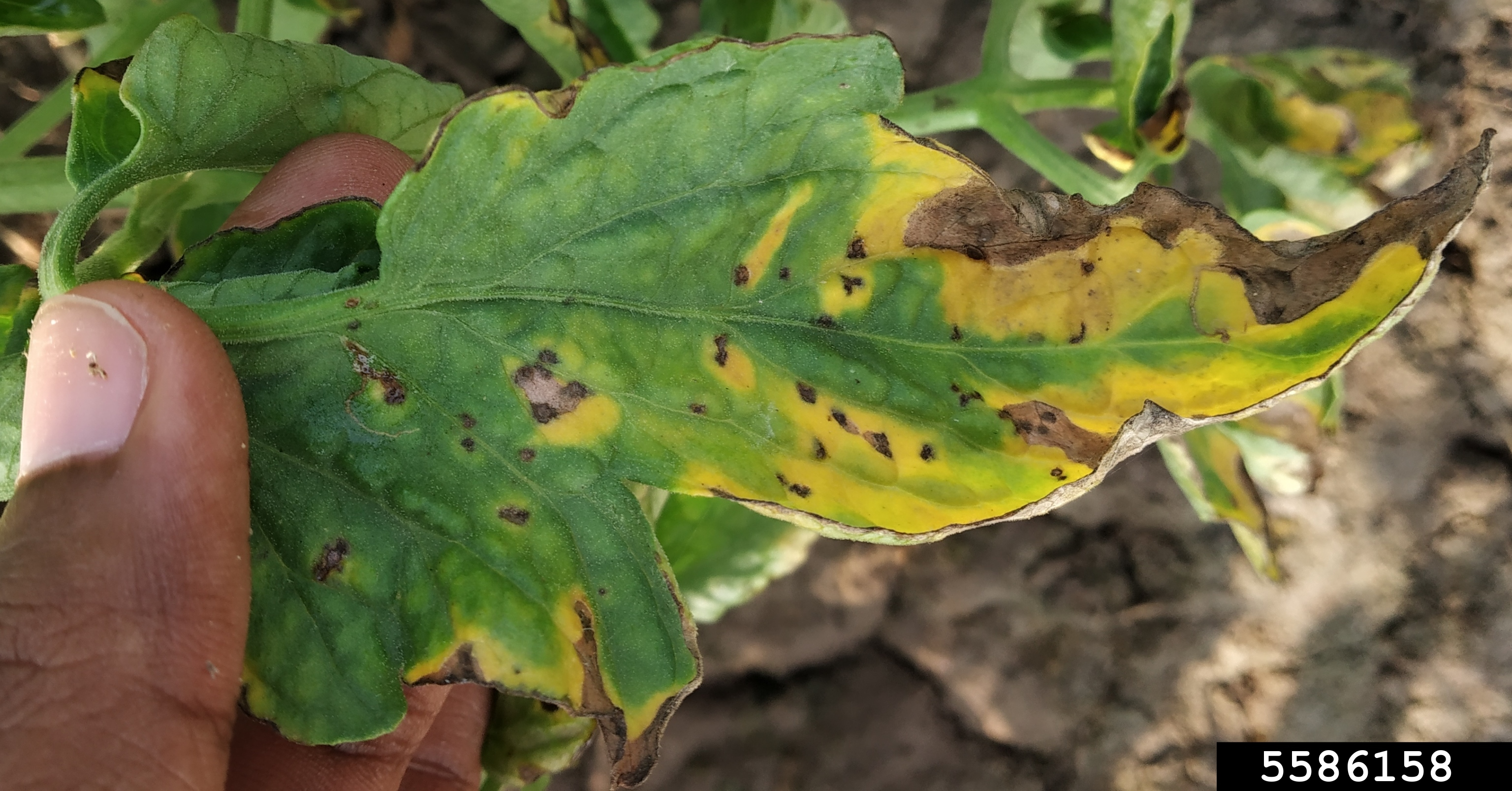
Septoria leaf spot, necrotic areas susceptible to leaf drop

Septoria malagutii is a fungal plant pathogen infecting potatoes. The casual fungal pathogen is a deuteromycete and therefore has no true sexual stage. As a result, Septoria produces pycnidia, an asexual flask shaped fruiting body, on the leaves of potato and other tuber-bearing spp. causing small black to brown necrotic lesions ranging in size from 1-5mm. The necrotic lesions can fuse together forming large necrotic areas susceptible to leaf drop, early senescence, dieback, and dwarfing. Septoria malagutii has been found only in the Andean countries of Bolivia, Ecuador, Peru, and Venezuela at altitudes of near 3000 meters. Consequently, the fungi grows and disperses best under relatively low temperatures with high humidities, with optimal growth occurring at 20 °C (68 °F). The disease has caused devastation on potato yields in South America and in areas where this disease is common, potato yields have been seen to drop by 60%.

== Hosts and symptoms ==
Hosts of Septoria malagutii include: potatoes and other tuber-bearing Solanum spp.; however, tomatoes can be infected by artificial inoculation. The disease is found in a series of 'tuberosa' in the Andes mountains of Ecuador, Peru, and Venezuela at elevations reaching above 3000m.Septoria malagutii is a deuteromycete; therefore, the fungi does not have a true sexual stage or the sexual stage is extremely uncommon. Consequently, the fungi reproduces asexually via its conidiomata, pycnidia. The pycnidia are an asexual flask shaped fruiting body that produces conidia via mitosis. Above ground parts of the potato become infected by the conidia (pycnidiospores) in a variety of natural ways such as rainy or windy conditions. Signs and symptoms of the disease are easily observable on the upper side of infected leaves where small, dark brown, and round necrotic lesions ranging in size from 1-5mm are formed. The lesions exhibit pronounced concentric ridges with 1 to 3 erumpent black pycnidia within the central ring. Other symptoms on the leaves include: the lesions often fusing together to create large necrotic areas, making the leaves brittle and susceptible to leaf drop or wind damage. Additionally, the stems can become discolored and resemble bark and the whole plant can exhibit dwarfing, early senescence, and dieback. Stem lesions are more elongated than leaf lesions reaching up to 15mm in length and 2mm in diameter. Furthermore, there has been no report on the underground plant parts, such as roots and tubers, having been affected by the pathogen. Potato is known to be the only naturally cultivated host and infection is limited to the leaves of potato plants under natural circumstances; and, fertile formation of pycnidia on living leaves has not been observed. Lastly, the prevalence of resistance in varying cultivars is low, ranging from moderately resistant to very resistant, but it is uncertain how long the pathogen can survive in the infected host debris in soil.

== Environment ==
Septoria malagutii is specific to the Andean countries of south South America: Bolivia, Ecuador, Peru, and Venezuela. In Ecuador, it is reported to occur mostly at temperatures of around 8 °C with a high relative humidity. The pathogen has a growth preference for lower temperatures explaining why it is found only in the high altitudes of the Andes mountain range. The minimum temperature for mycelial growth is 3 °C, while optimal growth occurs at 20–21 °C, and a maximum of 27 °C. A moist period with wet leaves of up to 2 days are required for the pathogen to infect plants at 16 to 22 °C. Moreover, the disease has been reported in cold and humid conditions in the Andes at altitudes above 2000m. These conditions make it the spread of the fungi favorable splashing to neighboring plants via rainwater, and insect vectors such as beetles.

== Management ==
Management of Septoria leaf spot of potato is important because once introduced into a new area due to its soil borne and long lasting nature it is impossible to eradicate. Today, Septoria malagutii and other septoria disease are controlled with a number of different methods including the use of fungicides and cultural controls. Fungicides such as Fluazinam, used for controlling late blight of potato, Phytotophoria infestans, have proven to be effective against S. Malagutti. Although the systemic anti-oomycete compounds have failed, fungicides should still be used during early stages of infection in order to prevent secondary spread via lesions being a source of inoculum spread. Likewise, the fungicide fentin was proven to be effective in controlling Septoria. In addition, biological controls such as copper sulfate can be integrated with other fungicides to further control the spread of disease by preventing germination of the pycnidia. Culturally, in places where potatoes can be grown all year round a Septoria infection can be avoided by planting during seasons with low humidity or higher temperatures. This is beneficial in controlling the disease because Septoria malagutii's mycelial growth is optimal in low temperatures and its spores disperse more efficiently under humid conditions. Likewise, since the pathogen can spread from inoculum sources such as plant debris on soil and wild hosts via clothing on farmers, footwear, tubers coated in soil, and cultivation equipment, so it is important to sterilize equipment between uses in order to limit its spread.

== Importance ==
The severity of Septoria leaf spot of Potato in the Northwestern countries of South America is notable. The disease destroys up to 60% of potato yield in South America causing significant crop loss in Andean countries. Moreover, countries within the European Union and elsewhere around the world are susceptible to establishment of the disease. Potatoes are widely grown in the EU and Septoria malagutii would have host availability and thrive in the cool humid climate of European countries, so it is essential to keep the disease contained to the Andes.
