= Septoria dianthi =

Scientific classification
- Domain: Eukaryota
- Kingdom: Fungi
- Division: Ascomycota
- Class: Dothideomycetes
- Order: Capnodiales
- Family: Mycosphaerellaceae
- Genus: Septoria
- Species: S. dianthi

Binomial name
- Septoria dianthi Desm. (1849)

Species of fungus

Septoria dianthi is a fungal plant pathogen infecting carnations.
