= Septoria passiflorae =

Scientific classification
- Kingdom: Fungi
- Division: Ascomycota
- Class: Dothideomycetes
- Order: Mycosphaerellales
- Family: Mycosphaerellaceae
- Genus: Septoria
- Species: S. passiflorae

Binomial name
- Septoria passiflorae Syd.

Species of fungal pathogen

Septoria passiflorae is a fungal pathogen in the genus Septoria that causes leaf spots and blotches on passion flower plants in the genus Passiflora. It is a destructive pathogen in commercial crops and is used as a bio-control in Hawaiʻi for banana poka, Passiflora tarminiana.

It was released in Hawaiʻi in 1996 on Hawaiʻi Island, Maui and Kauaʻi. The pathogen was noted to be most effective in the Hilo Forest Reserve where the Hawaii Division of Forestry recorded a reduction of 80-90% of plant biomass on 5,000 acres (2,000 ha). The pathogen has not been equally effective in other areas.

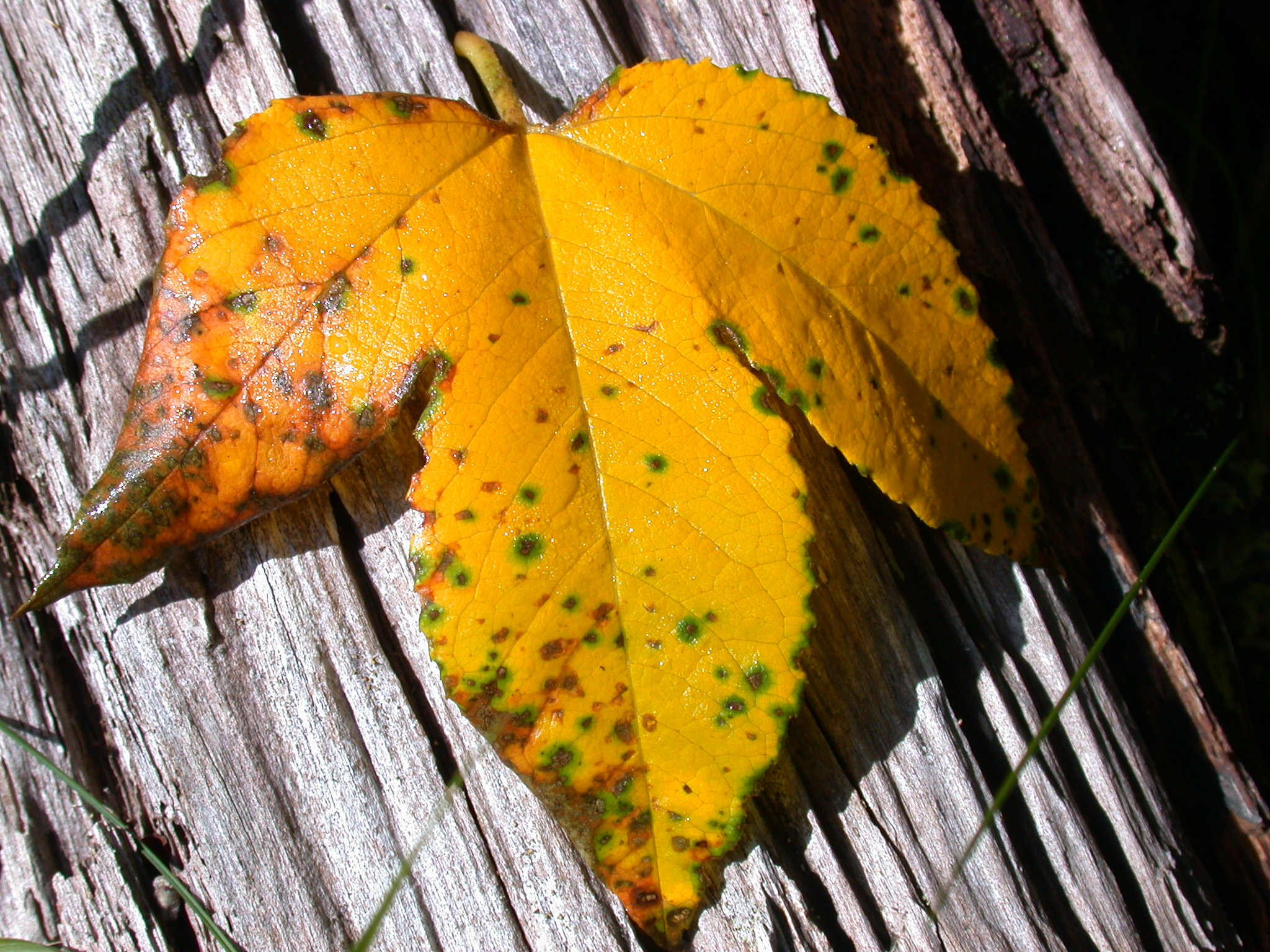
Septoria passiflorae on banana poka, passiflora tarminiana (see green halo around dark middle dot)

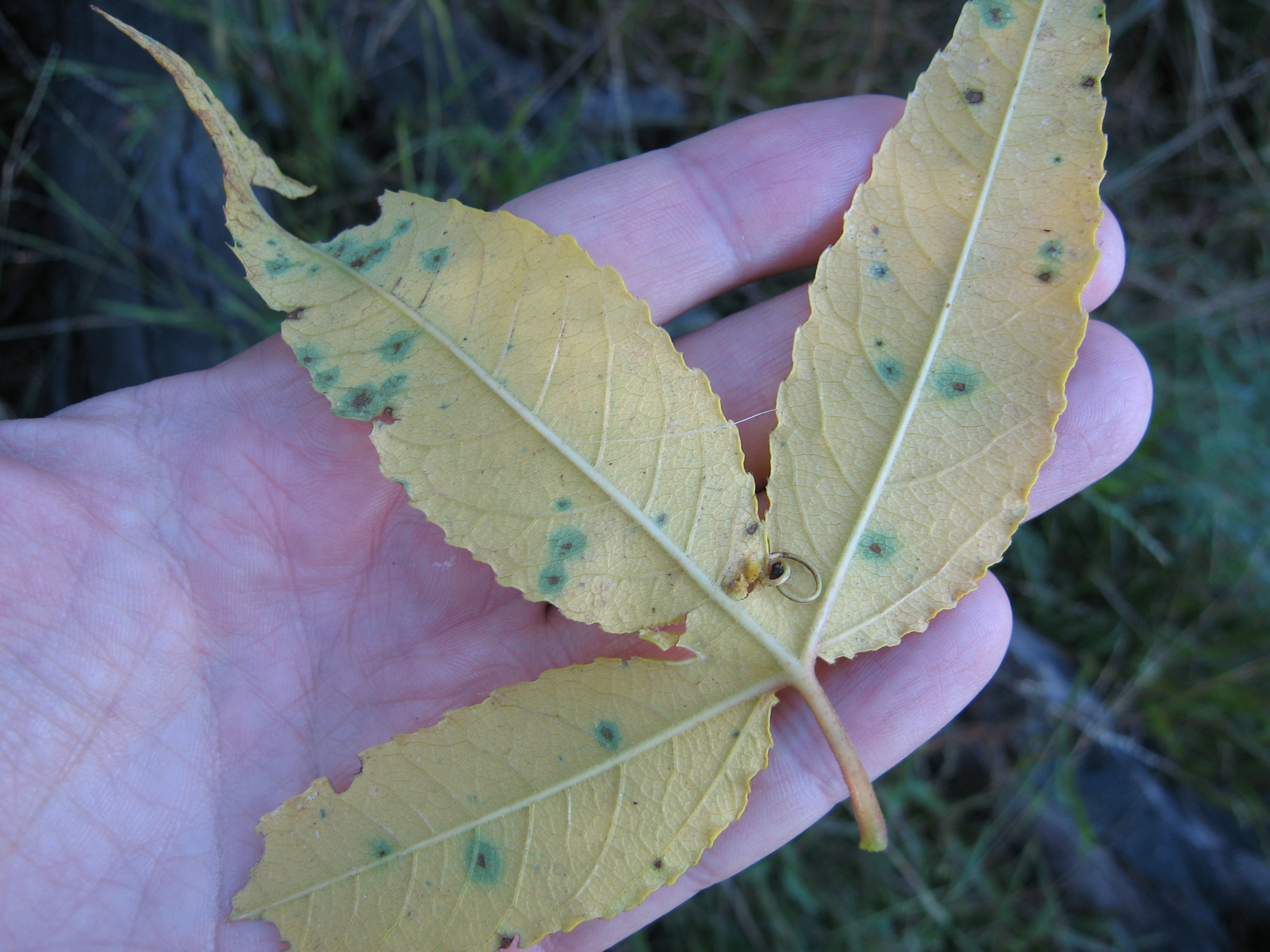
Septoria passiflorae on banana poka, passiflora tarminiana (back of leaf)

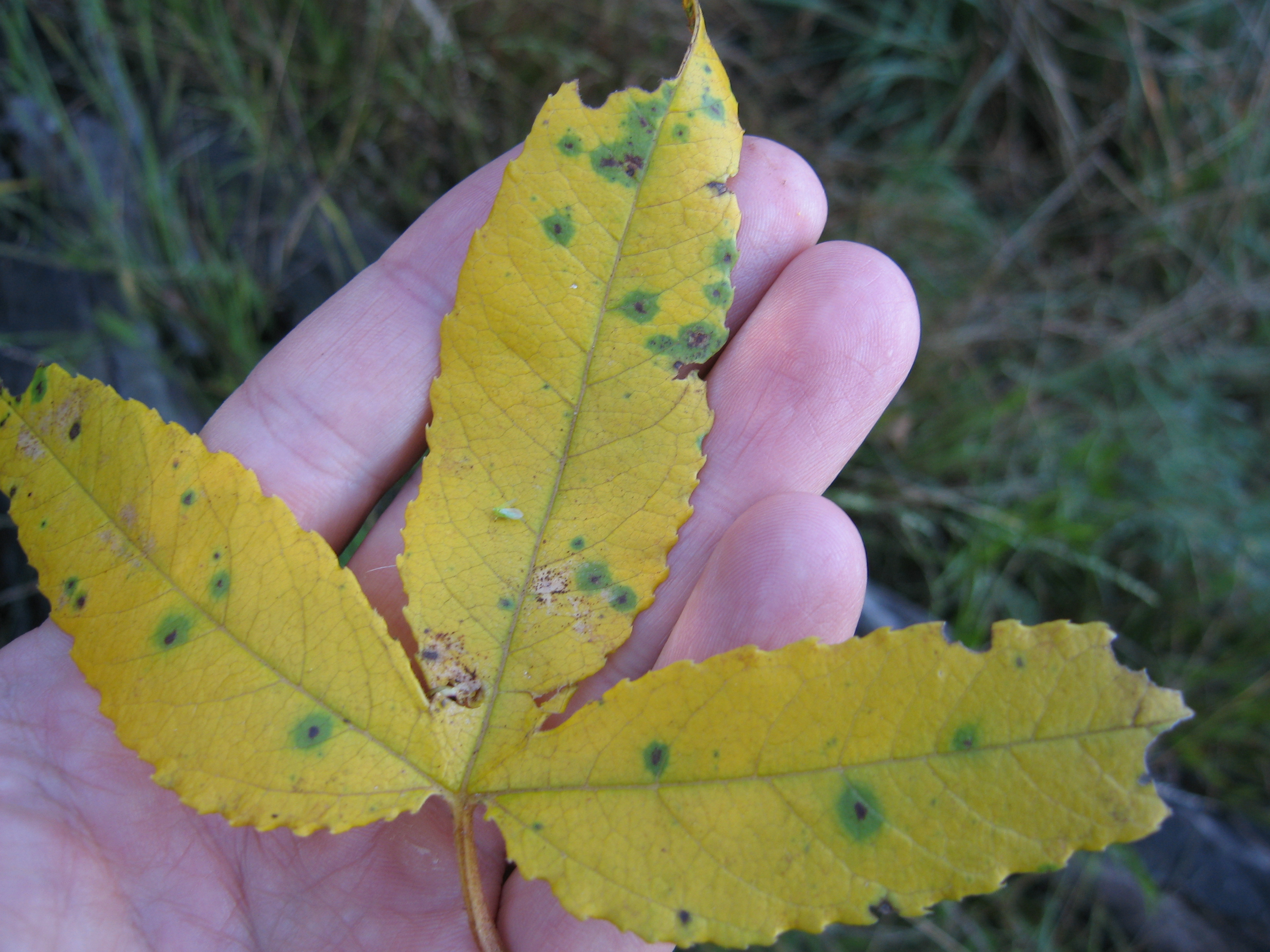
Septoria passiflorae on banana poka, passiflora tarminiana (front of leaf)
