= Septoria campanulae =

Scientific classification
- Kingdom: Fungi
- Division: Ascomycota
- Class: Dothideomycetes
- Order: Mycosphaerellales
- Family: Mycosphaerellaceae
- Genus: Septoria
- Species: S. campanulae

Binomial name
- Septoria campanulae (Lév.) Sacc. (1884)

Species of fungus

Septoria campanulae is a fungal plant pathogen infecting bellflowers. It is closely related to other species from hosts in Apiaceae, such as Septoria aegopodina and Septoria oenanthis.
