= Septoria humuli =

Scientific classification
- Domain: Eukaryota
- Kingdom: Fungi
- Division: Ascomycota
- Class: Dothideomycetes
- Order: Capnodiales
- Family: Mycosphaerellaceae
- Genus: Septoria
- Species: S. humuli

Binomial name
- Septoria humuli Westend. (1854)

Species of fungus

Septoria humuli is a fungal plant pathogen infecting the hop plant.
