= Vacuolar interface dermatitis =

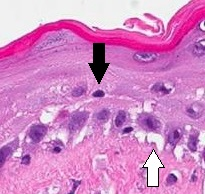
Vacuolar interface dermatitis, with lymphocytes in the dermis and epidermis (black arrow indicates one), and vacuolization (white arrow) at the dermoepidermal junction.

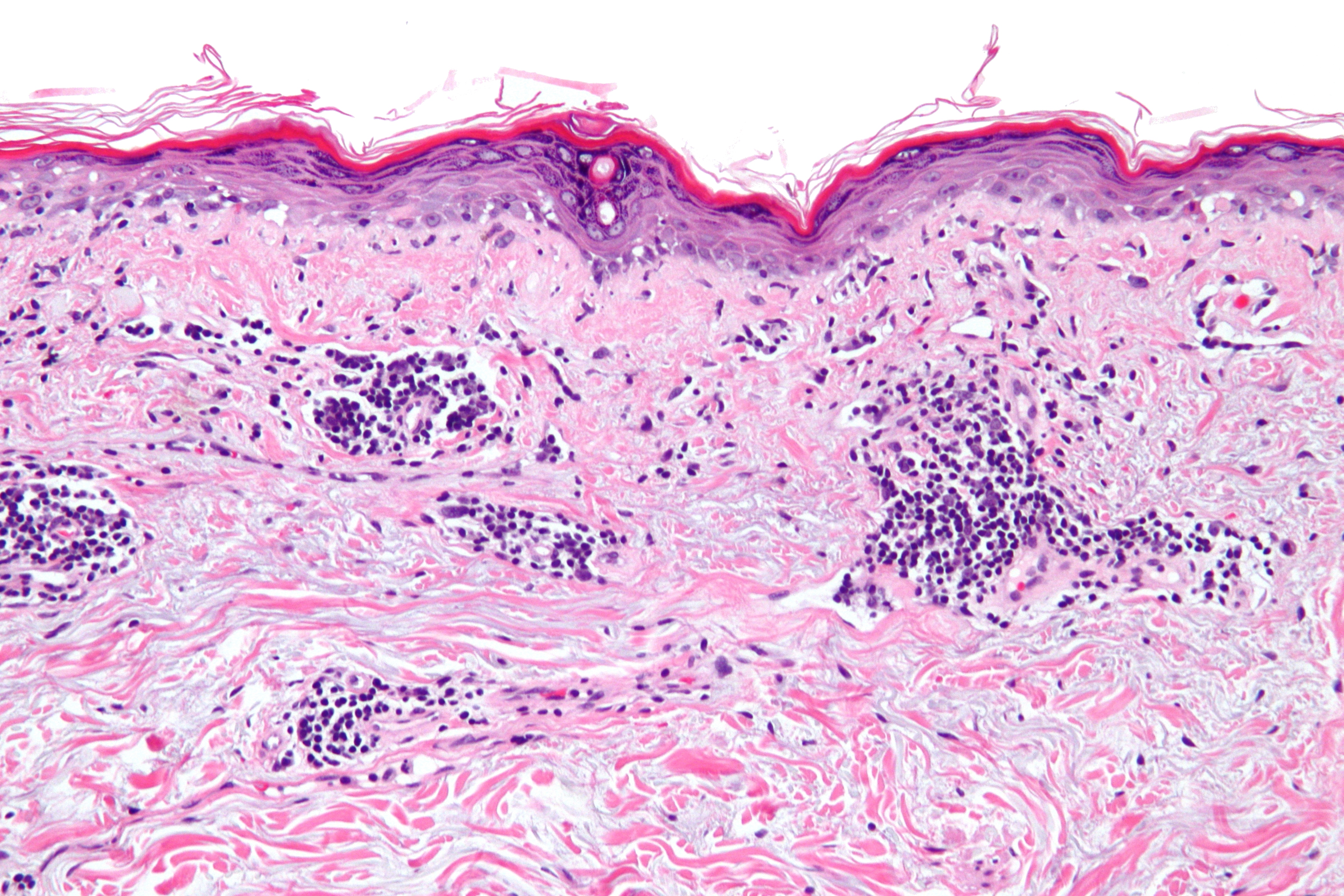
Micrograph of a vacuolar interface dermatitis with dermal mucin, as may be seen in lupus. H&E stain.

Vacuolar interface dermatitis (VAC, also known as liquefaction degeneration, vacuolar alteration or hydropic degeneration) is a dermatitis with vacuolization at the dermoepidermal junction, with lymphocytic inflammation at the epidermis and dermis.

== Causes ==
Causes of vacuolar interface dermatitis
Main conditions	Characteristics	Micrograph	Photograph
Generally/Not otherwise specified	Typical findings, called "vacuolar interface dermatitis": Mild inflammatory cell infiltrate along the dermoepidermal junction (black arrow in image); Vacuolization within the basal keratinocytes (white arrow in image); Often necrotic, predominantly basal, individual keratinocytes, manifesting as colloid or Civatte bodies		
Acute graft-versus-host-disease	Vacuolar alteration of various severity, from focal or diffuse vacuolation of the basal keratinocytes (grade I), to separation at the dermoepidermal junction (grade III); Involvement of the hair follicle; Rarely eosinophils		
Allergic drug reaction	Rarely involvement of hair follicles.; Frequently eosinophils		
Lichen sclerosus	Hyperkeratosis, atrophic epidermis, sclerosis of dermis and dermal lymphocytes.		
Erythema multiforme			
Lupus erythematosis	Typical findings in systemic lupus erythematosus: Fibrinoid necrosis at the dermoepidermal junction; Liquefactive degeneration and atrophy of the epidermis; Mucin deposition in the reticular dermis; Edema, small hemorrhages; Mild and mainly lymphocytic infiltrate in the upper dermis; Fibrinoid material in the dermis around capillary blood vessels, on collagen and in the interstitium; In non-bullous cases, perivascular and interstitial neutrophils are sometimes present in the upper dermis, with damage to blood vessels		

An interface dermatitis with vacuolar alteration, not otherwise specified, may be caused by viral exanthems, phototoxic dermatitis, acute radiation dermatitis, erythema dyschromicum perstans, lupus erythematosus and dermatomyositis.
