= Erythrocyanosis crurum =

- Specialty: Dermatology

Erythrocyanosis crurum is a skin condition, a variant of acrocyanosis caused by chronic exposure to cold.

== See also ==
- Chilblains
- List of cutaneous conditions
