= Septoria secalis =

Scientific classification
- Kingdom: Fungi
- Division: Ascomycota
- Class: Dothideomycetes
- Order: Mycosphaerellales
- Family: Mycosphaerellaceae
- Genus: Septoria
- Species: S. secalis

Binomial name
- Septoria secalis Prill. & Delacr., (1889)

Pathogenic fungus

Septoria secalis also known as Septoria Leaf Blotch is a fungal plant pathogen infecting rye.

== Morphology & Biology ==
Septoria secalis is a common disease that mainly attacks rye leaves. Small spots appear between leaf veins, elongate, then turn yellow-brown and become pale. The disease appears most often on seedling leaves during the autumn, but also affects adult plants.

== Economic impact ==
Severe attacks of Septoria secalis can result in crop yield losses between 10% and 40%. Common control measures include crop rotation, the ploughing of plant debris, and fungicidal treatment of affected plants. Yan & Hunt 2001 finds that in most years SLB is the primary yield loss factor in Ontario, Canada. It is also a pathogen of concern in Europe.
