= Septoria passerinii =

Scientific classification
- Kingdom: Fungi
- Division: Ascomycota
- Class: Dothideomycetes
- Order: Capnodiales
- Family: Mycosphaerellaceae
- Genus: Septoria
- Species: S. passerinii

Binomial name
- Septoria passerinii Sacc., (1884)

Synonyms
- Septoria murina

Pathogenic fungus affecting barley

Septoria passerinii is a fungal plant pathogen that infects barley causing Septoria speckled leaf blotch.
