= Septoria rhododendri =

Scientific classification
- Kingdom: Fungi
- Division: Ascomycota
- Class: Dothideomycetes
- Order: Mycosphaerellales
- Family: Mycosphaerellaceae
- Genus: Septoria
- Species: S. rhododendri

Binomial name
- Septoria rhododendri Cooke, Grevillea (1877)

Species of fungus

Septoria rhododendri is a fungal plant pathogen infecting rhododendrons.
