= Septoria glycines =

Scientific classification
- Domain: Eukaryota
- Kingdom: Fungi
- Division: Ascomycota
- Class: Dothideomycetes
- Order: Capnodiales
- Family: Mycosphaerellaceae
- Genus: Septoria
- Species: S. glycines

Binomial name
- Septoria glycines Hemmi

Species of fungus

Septoria glycines is a fungal plant pathogen that causes leaf spot on soybean, a disease that is also known as brown spot. The disease leads to early defoliation of the plant, but does not normally cause severe reductions in yield. The fungus overwinters on infected soybean straw and is spread by wind dispersal or rain splash.
