= Septoria ampelina =

Scientific classification
- Domain: Eukaryota
- Kingdom: Fungi
- Division: Ascomycota
- Class: Dothideomycetes
- Order: Capnodiales
- Family: Mycosphaerellaceae
- Genus: Septoria
- Species: S. ampelina

Binomial name
- Septoria ampelina Berk. & M.A. Curtis (1874)

Species of fungus

Septoria ampelina is a fungal plant pathogen that affects grapes causing septoria leaf spot.
