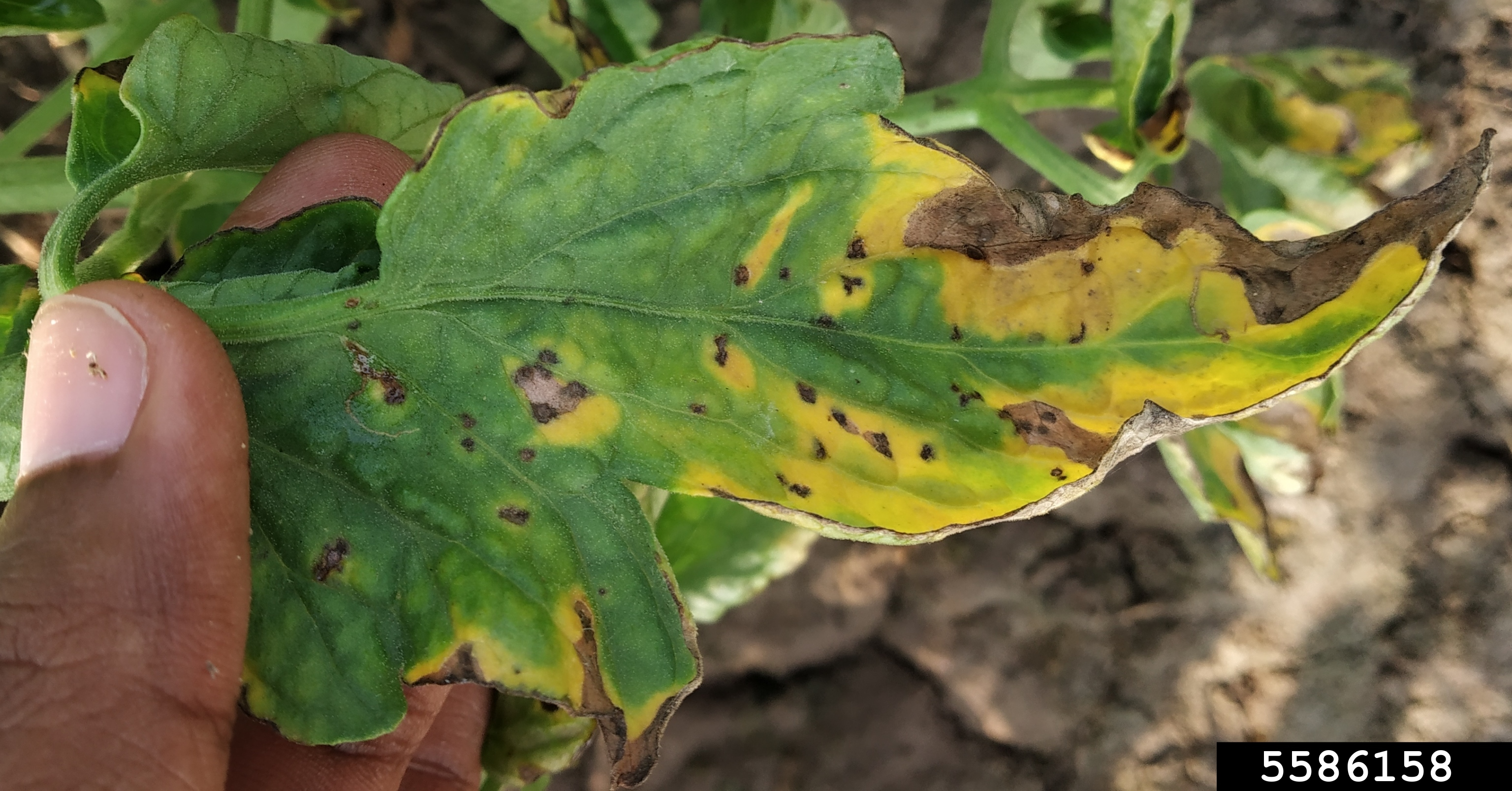
- S. lycopersici on tomato
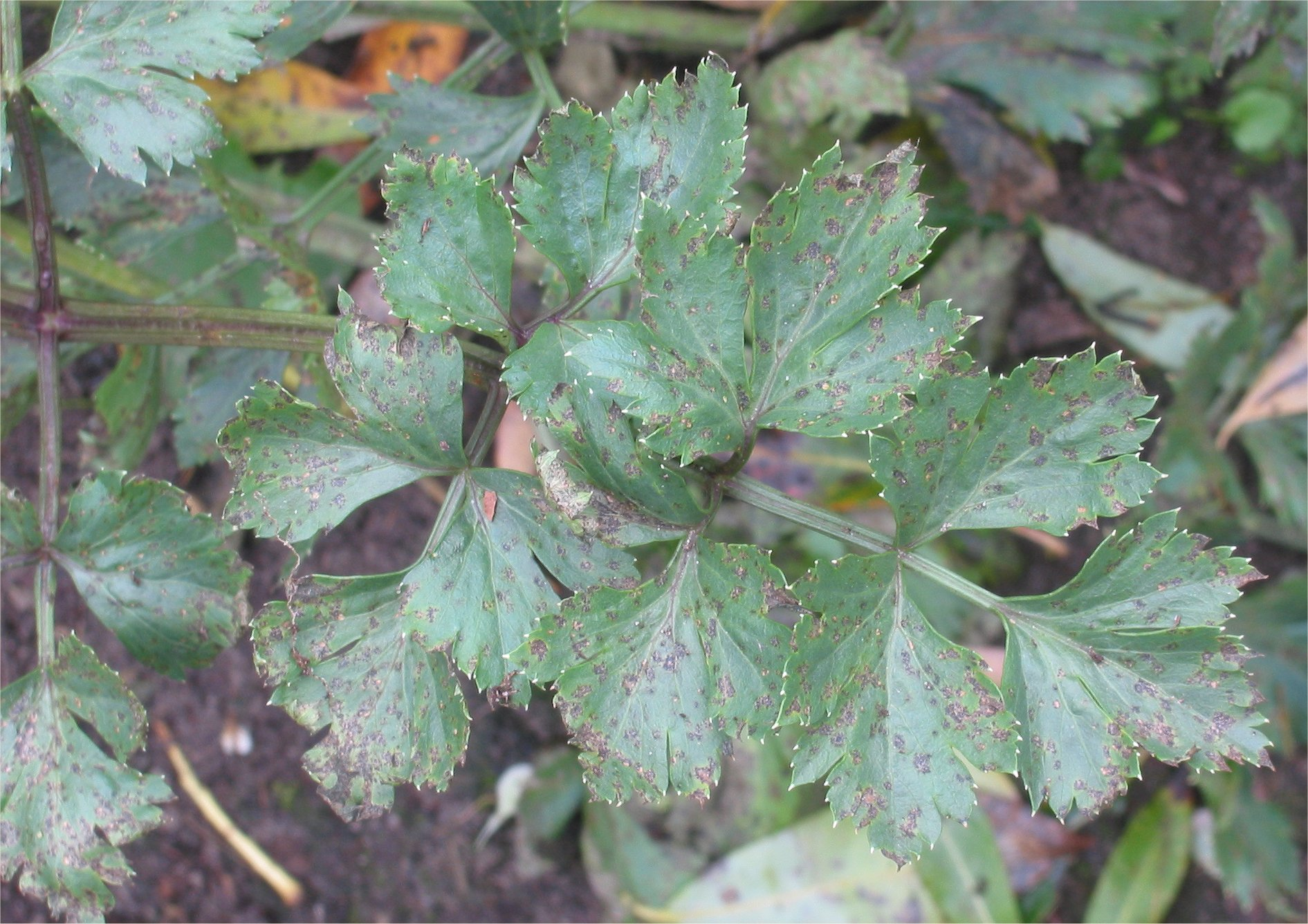
- S. apiicola on celery

Scientific classification
- Kingdom: Fungi
- Division: Ascomycota
- Class: Dothideomycetes
- Order: Mycosphaerellales
- Family: Mycosphaerellaceae
- Genus: Septoria; Sacc. (1884)

Type species
- Septoria cytisi Desm. (1847)

Species
- See text

= Septoria =

Genus of fungi

Septoria is a genus of fungal plant pathogens in the phylum Ascomycota. They cause necrotic leaf spots on the leaves of their hosts, producing filiform or cylindrical conidia inside pycnidia embedded in the leaves. Economically important species cause diseases on field crops, forages, and vegetables. The genus is widespread, and estimated to contain 1072 species.

== Notable species ==
Septoria apiicola is the cause of late blight of celery. It can survive on seeds, causing disease in the seedlings when they germinate.

Several species of passion flower are infected by several species of Septoria. One species, initially thought to be Septoria passiflorae, but actually an undescribed species, has been used to control the invasive Passiflora tarminiana in Hawai'i.

== Dispersal ==
The pycnidia produce conidia, which are pushed out through an opening. They are spread by splashing rain.

== Taxonomy ==
In 2013, two large volumes (about 80 pages a piece) on Septoria and septoria-like fungi were published in the open access journal Studies in Mycology. In these papers by Quaedvlieg et al. and Verkley et al., the genus Septoria is clearly defined and identification techniques are discussed in detail. Besides going into detail about the genus Septoria s. str., many septoria-like genera are discussed and clearly illustrated.

Species include:

- Septoria apiicola
- Septoria aciculosa
- Septoria ampelina
- Septoria azaleae
- Septoria bataticola
- Septoria campanulae
- Septoria cannabis
- Septoria caryae
- Septoria citri
- Septoria cucurbitacearum
- Septoria cytisi
- Septoria darrowii
- Septoria dianthi
- Septoria eumusae
- Septoria fragariae
- Septoria fragariaecola
- Septoria glycines
- Septoria helianthi
- Septoria humuli
- Septoria hydrangeae
- Septoria lactucae
- Septoria lycopersici
- Septoria malagutii
- Septoria matthiolae
- Septoria menthae
- Septoria musiva
- Septoria ostryae
- Septoria passerinii
- Septoria passiflorae
- Septoria pisi
- Septoria pistaciae
- Septoria platanifolia
- Septoria rhododendri
- Septoria secalis
- Septoria selenophomoides
- Septoria steviae
- Septoria tritici — Now Zymoseptoria tritici

== Gallery ==
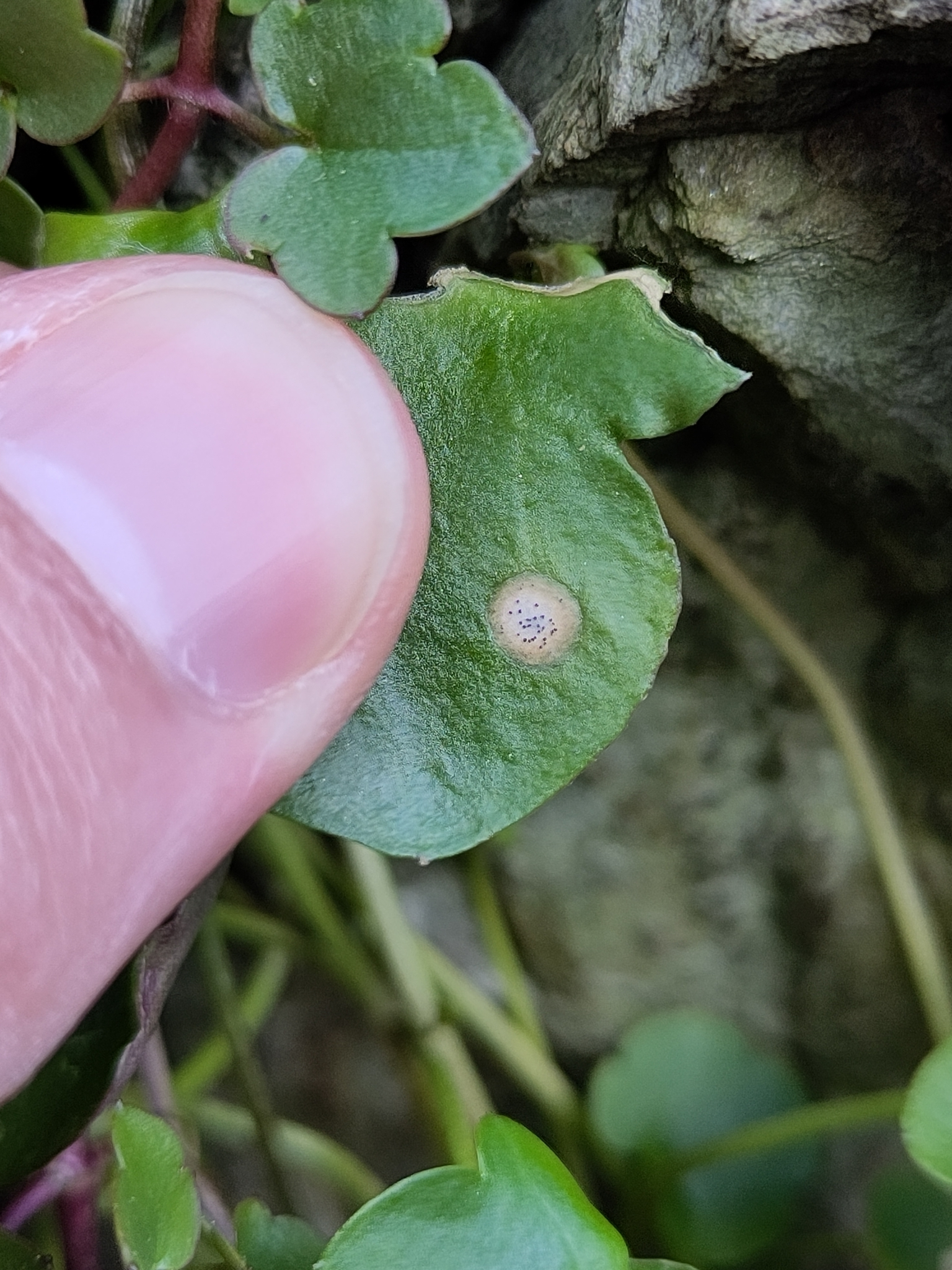
Septoria cymbalariae on Cymbalaria muralis.

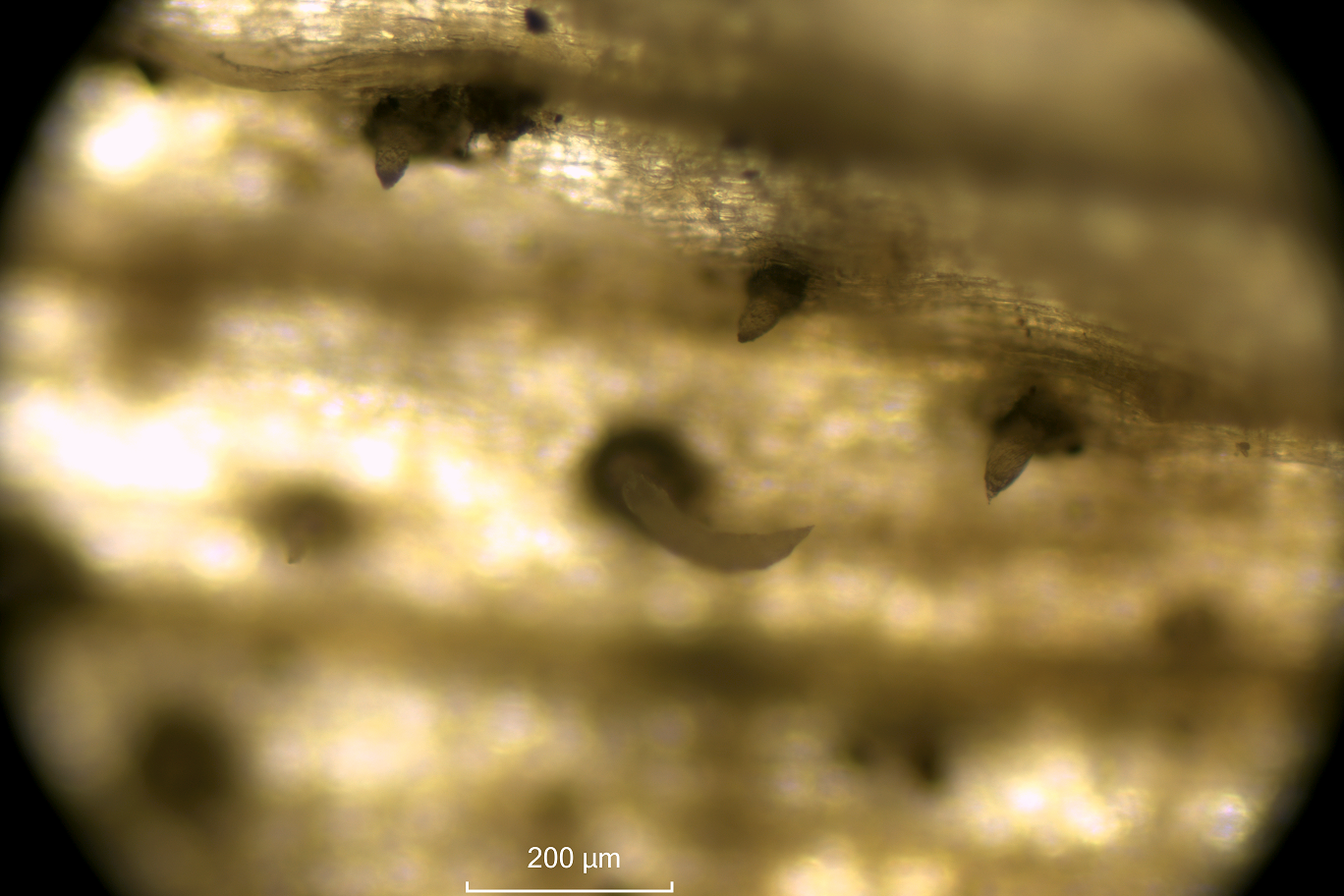
Pycnidia of a Septoria found on Hyacinthoides non-scripta. They are extruding columns of conidia.

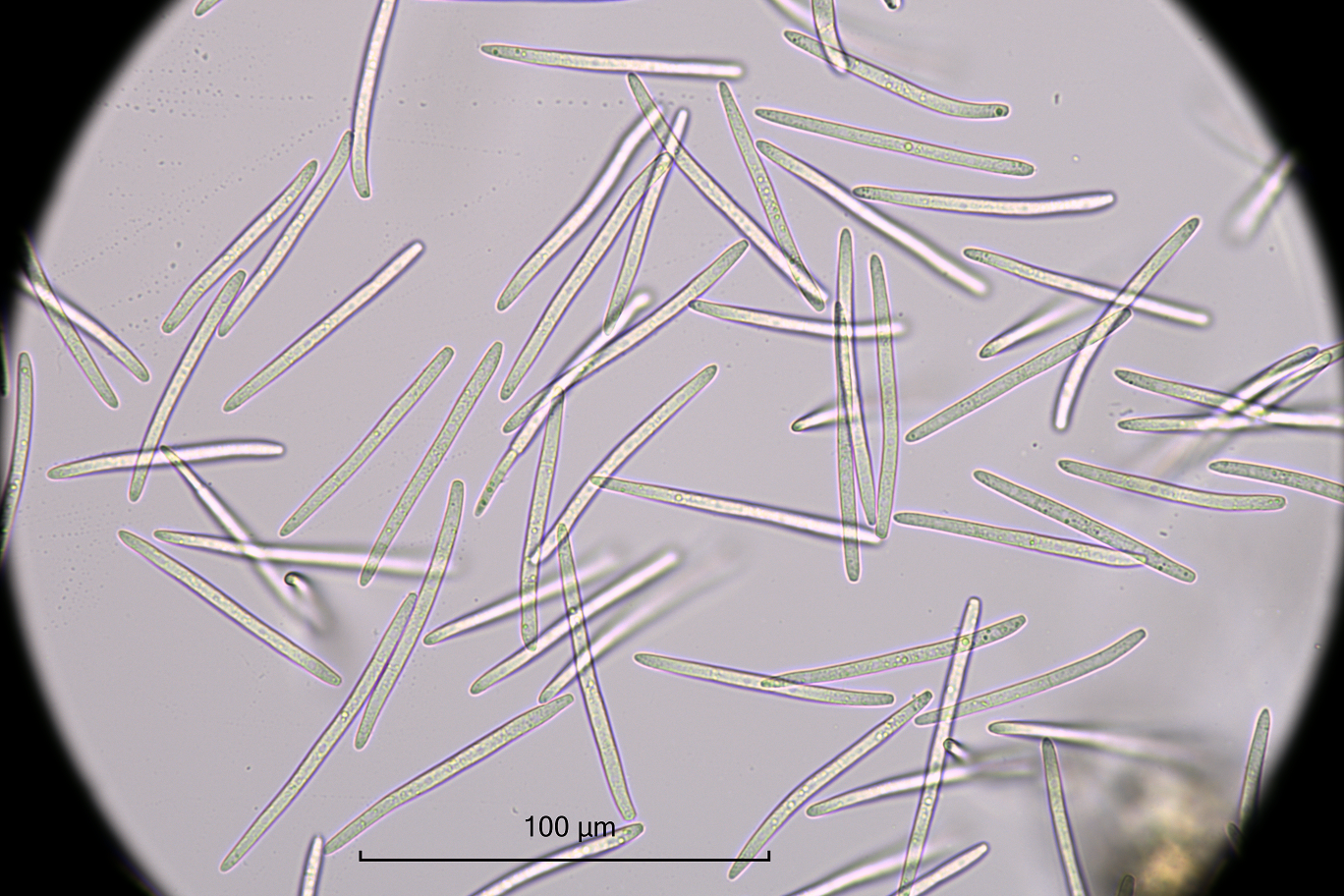
Conidia of a Septoria found on Hyacinthoides non-scripta.
