= Septoria fragariaecola =

Scientific classification
- Kingdom: Fungi
- Division: Ascomycota
- Class: Dothideomycetes
- Order: Capnodiales
- Family: Mycosphaerellaceae
- Genus: Septoria
- Species: S. fragariaecola

Binomial name
- Septoria fragariaecola Lobik, (1928)

Species of fungus

Septoria fragariaecola is a fungal plant pathogen infecting strawberries.
