= Septoria darrowii =

Scientific classification
- Domain: Eukaryota
- Kingdom: Fungi
- Division: Ascomycota
- Class: Dothideomycetes
- Order: Capnodiales
- Family: Mycosphaerellaceae
- Genus: Septoria
- Species: S. darrowii

Binomial name
- Septoria darrowii Zeller (1938)

Synonyms
- Septoria rubi var. brevispora Sacc. (1916); Septoria brevispora (Sacc.) Zeller (1937)

Species of fungus

Septoria darrowii is a species of fungus in the family Mycosphaerellaceae. It is a plant pathogen infecting caneberries.
