= Septoria caryae =

Scientific classification
- Domain: Eukaryota
- Kingdom: Fungi
- Division: Ascomycota
- Class: Dothideomycetes
- Order: Capnodiales
- Family: Mycosphaerellaceae
- Genus: Septoria
- Species: S. caryae

Binomial name
- Septoria caryae Ellis & Everh. (1887)

Species of fungus

Septoria caryae is a fungal plant pathogen. It infects species of the hickory genus.
