= Equestrian perniosis =

Skin condition

- Specialty: Dermatology

Equestrian perniosis is a skin condition that presents on the lateral thighs of equestrians who ride in cold, damp weather.

== Signs and symptoms ==
Equestrian perniosis lesions appear as red to violaceous patches or plaques on the lateral and posterior thighs and buttocks, often following winter horse-riding in cold, damp conditions. The lesions may be painful, pruritic, scaly, crusted, ulcerated, or necrotic. Associated findings may include Raynaud’s phenomenon and livedo reticularis.

== Diagnosis ==
Diagnosis is clinical, based on lesion appearance and history of cold exposure during horse-riding. Histological findings are consistent with chilblains, showing vacuolar interface dermatitis with lymphocytic infiltrates, endothelial swelling, and mucin deposition. Blood tests are usually unremarkable.

== Management ==
The primary approach to management is warm, loose-fitting clothing. Topical corticosteroids may be used for symptom relief. Oral vasodilators are generally ineffective. Heated pads may offer limited relief.

Lesions typically resolve spontaneously.

=== Prevention ===
Preventive strategies include avoiding tight clothing, minimizing cold exposure, and wearing insulated clothes during winter riding. Risk factors include being female, young age, smoking, high BMI, prolonged riding, and tight clothing.

== History ==
The condition was first reported in 1980 by Beacham et al., who coined the term "equestrian panniculitis", also known as "equestrian perniosis" or "equestrian chilblains".

Though once considered rare, a 2011 Finnish survey found symptoms consistent with equestrian perniosis in approximately 25% of riders during October–March.

Similar presentations have been reported in other outdoor activities, including cycling, motorbiking, and river crossing, especially when combined with tight-fitting clothing and prolonged exposure to cold, wet conditions. This broader spectrum of triggers has led to discussions on whether "cold-associated perniosis of the thighs" is a more accurate descriptor.

== See also ==
- Chilblains
- List of cutaneous conditions
