= Septoria menthae =

Scientific classification
- Domain: Eukaryota
- Kingdom: Fungi
- Division: Ascomycota
- Class: Dothideomycetes
- Order: Capnodiales
- Family: Mycosphaerellaceae
- Genus: Septoria
- Species: S. menthae

Binomial name
- Septoria menthae (Thüm.) Oudem., (1875)

Synonyms
- Depazea menthae Thüm.

Species of fungus

Septoria menthae is a fungal plant pathogen infecting mint. It is the causal organism of mint leafspot.
