= Septoria hydrangeae =

Scientific classification
- Kingdom: Fungi
- Division: Ascomycota
- Class: Dothideomycetes
- Order: Mycosphaerellales
- Family: Mycosphaerellaceae
- Genus: Septoria
- Species: S. hydrangeae

Binomial name
- Septoria hydrangeae Bizz.

Species of fungus

Septoria hydrangeae is a fungal plant pathogen infecting hydrangeas.
