= Vacuolization =

Formation of vacuoles within or adjacent to cells

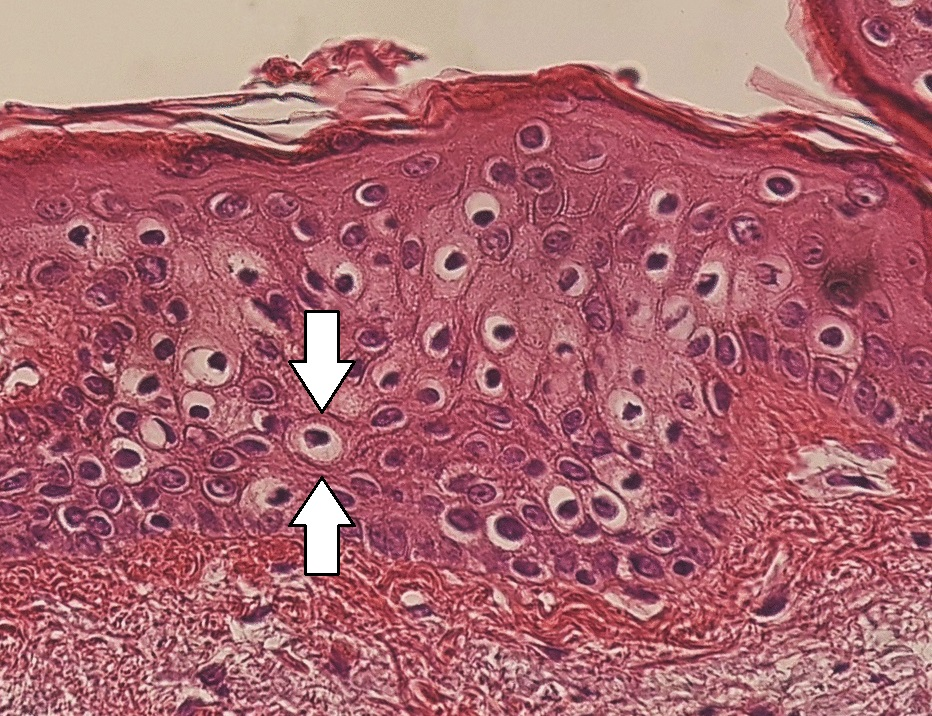
Perinuclear vacuolization of epidermal keratinocytes (one indicated by arrows), in this case an insignificant incidental finding.

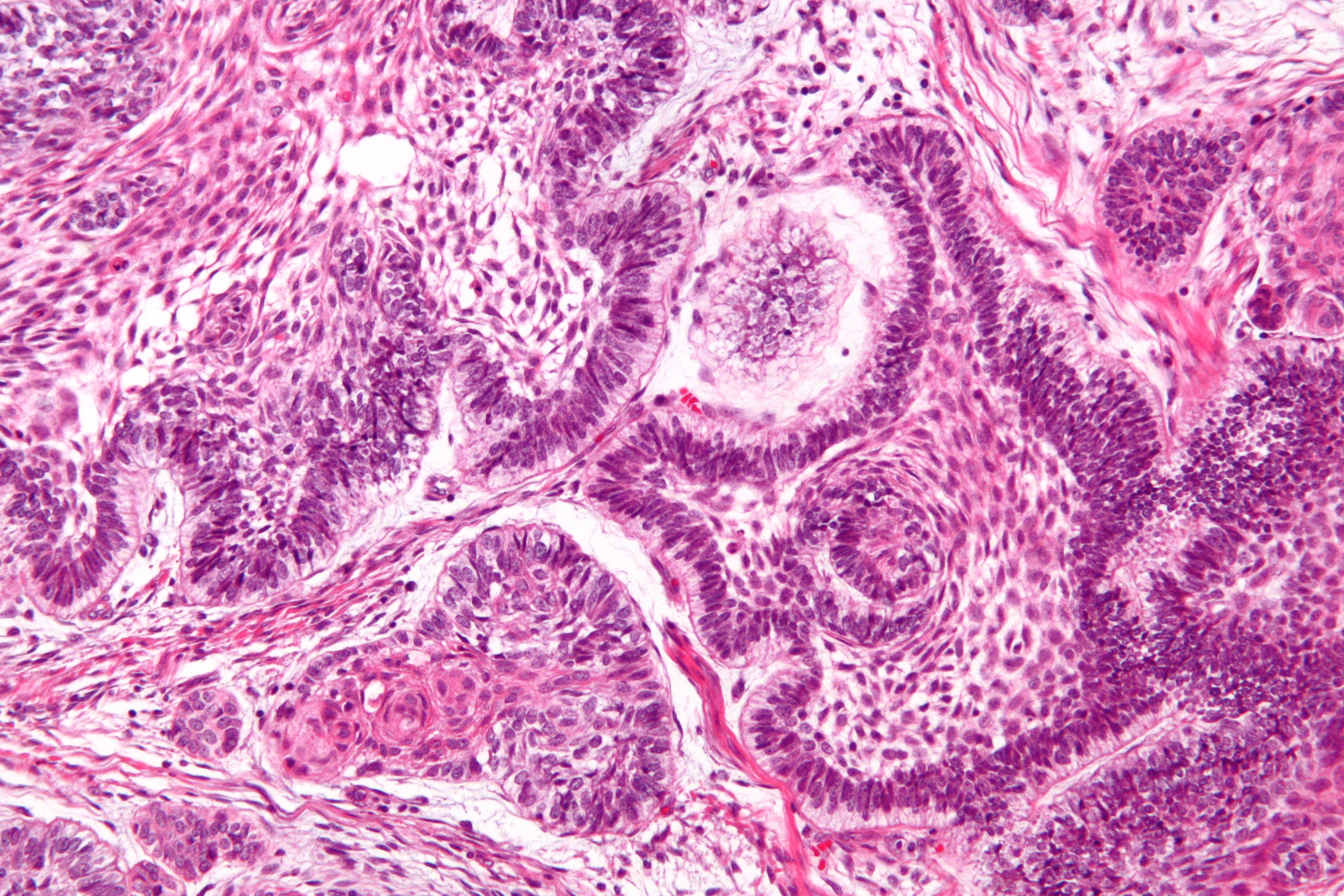
Subnuclear vacuolization in palisading cell - vacuoles at the basement membrane aspect, resembling a brighter stripe in the periphery of palisades.

Vacuolization is the formation of vacuoles or vacuole-like structures, within or adjacent to cells. Perinuclear vacuolization of epidermal keratinocytes is most likely inconsequential when not observed in combination with other pathologic findings. In dermatopathology "vacuolization" often refers specifically to vacuoles in the basal cell-basement membrane zone area, where it is an unspecific sign of disease. It may be a sign of for example vacuolar interface dermatitis, which in turn has many causes.

It is one of the components of koilocytosis, which may be present in potentially pre-cancerous cervical, oral and anal lesions.

== See also ==
- Skin lesion
- Skin disease
- List of skin diseases
