= Septoria citri =

Scientific classification
- Kingdom: Fungi
- Division: Ascomycota
- Class: Dothideomycetes
- Order: Capnodiales
- Family: Mycosphaerellaceae
- Genus: Septoria
- Species: S. citri

Binomial name
- Septoria citri Pass. (1877)

Species of fungus

Septoria citri is a fungal plant pathogen infecting citruses.
