= Chilblains =

Inflammation due to damage of skin capillaries when blood perfuses into nearby tissue

- Other names: Pernio, perniones, kibes, perniosis
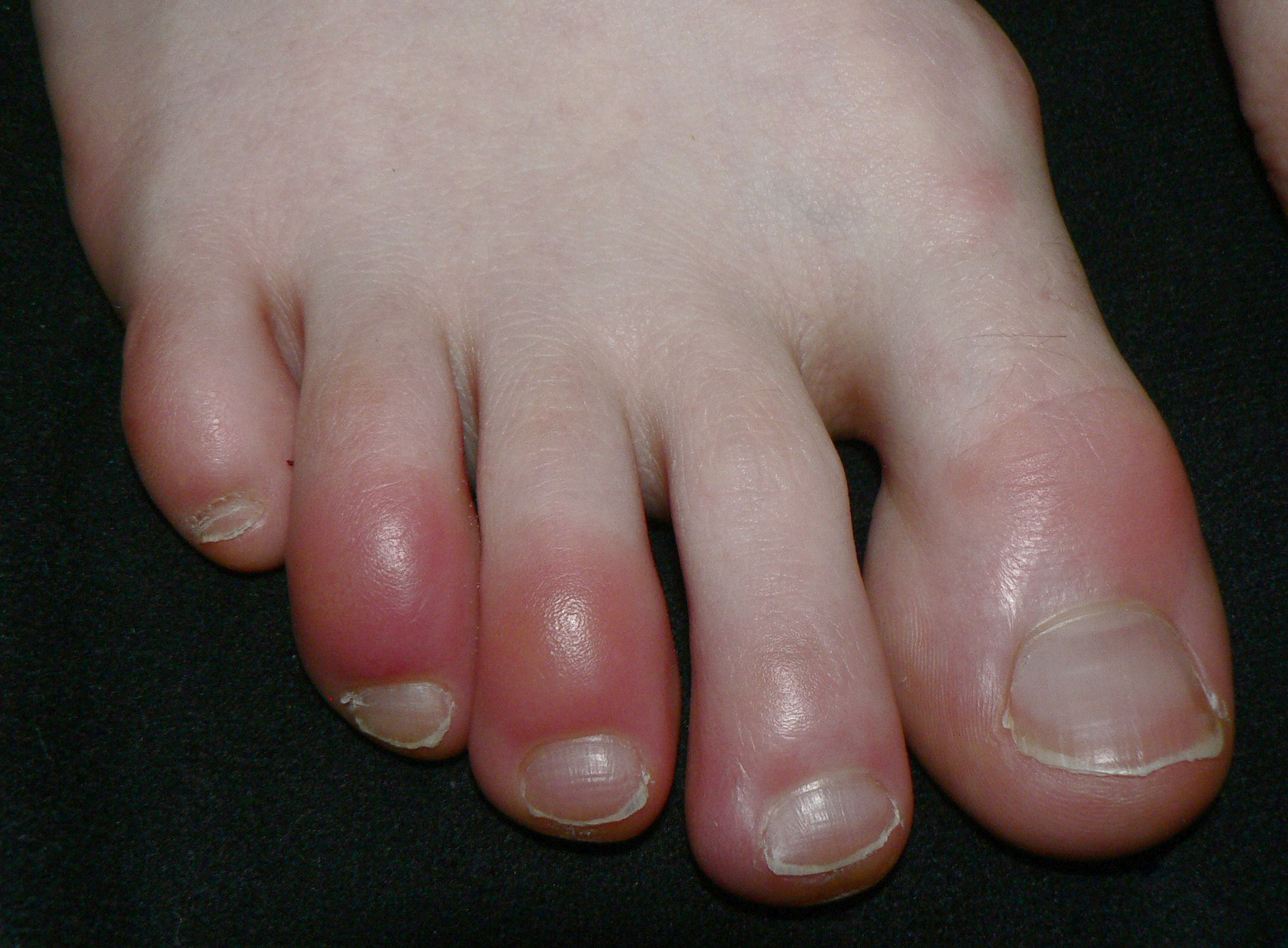
- Toes inflamed by chilblains
- Pronunciation: /ˈtʃɪlbleɪnz/
- Specialty: Internal medicine, podiatry

Chilblains, also known as pernio, is a medical condition in which damage occurs to capillary beds in the skin, most often in the hands or feet, when blood perfuses into the nearby tissue, resulting in redness, itching, inflammation, and possibly blisters.

It occurs most frequently when predisposed individuals, predominantly women, are exposed to cold and humidity. Ulcerated chilblains are referred to as kibes. Temperature-related chilblains can be prevented by keeping the feet and hands warm in cold weather and avoiding exposing these areas to extreme temperature changes. Once the diagnosis of chilblains is made, first-line treatment includes avoiding cold, damp environments and wearing gloves and warm socks.

Chilblains can be idiopathic (spontaneous and unrelated to another disease), but similar symptoms may also be a manifestation of another serious medical condition that must be investigated. Related medical conditions include Raynaud syndrome, erythromelalgia, frostbite, and trench foot, as well as connective tissue diseases such as lupus or vasculitis. In infants affected by Aicardi–Goutières syndrome (a rare inherited condition which affects the nervous system), chilblain-like symptoms occur together with severe neurologic disturbances and unexplained fevers.

== Signs and symptoms ==
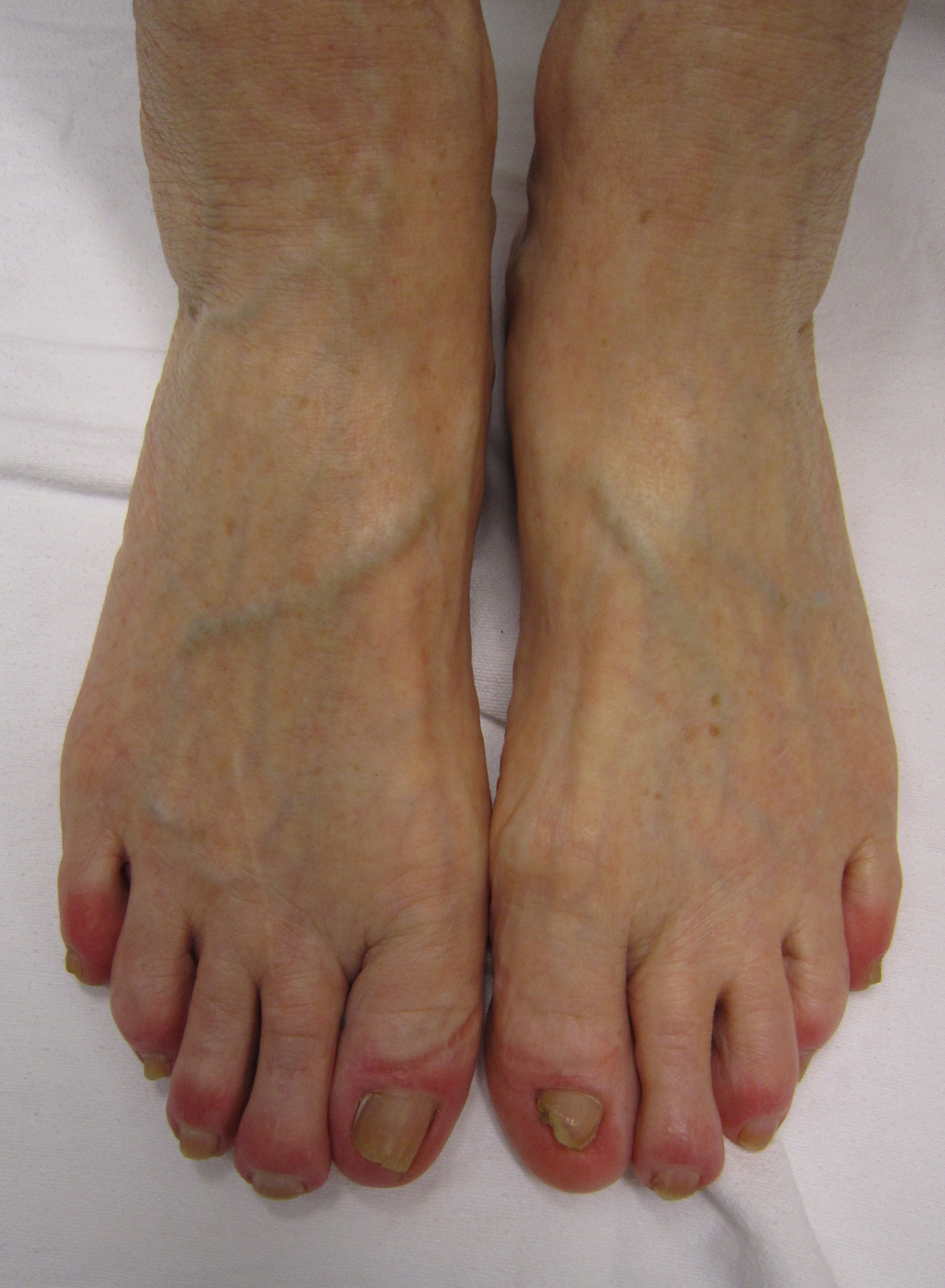
Chilblains of the feet, caused by excessive exposure to cold and humidity

Symptoms of chilblains include dermatitis in toes, fingers, earlobes, nose and other extremities. This may present as:

- Burning and itching sensations
- Throbbing pain
- Skin discoloration (red to dark blue) with erythema (blanchable redness)
- Blistering of affected area
- Ulceration (in severe cases only)

Chilblains caused by exposure to cold and humidity usually heal within 7–14 days.

== Treatment ==
Nifedipine and amlodipine, which are vasodilators in the class of drugs known as calcium channel blockers, may be used as treatments. Vasodilation may reduce pain, facilitate healing, and prevent recurrences. Vasodilators are typically available in an oral pill but can be compounded into a topical formula. Diltiazem, another vasodilator, is also sometimes used.

== Etymology ==
The word is a compound of Modern English chill 'cold' and the archaic word blain (now used only in the word in question), meaning 'swelling', 'blister' or 'sore' and derived from Old English bleġen, bleġene, having the same meaning.

== Alternative remedies ==
The medieval Bald's Leechbook recommended treating chilblains with a mixture of eggs, wine, and fennel root. A modern-day home remedy is to put garlic on the chilblains. Other herbal remedies supposed to be vasodilating, rubifacient, and warming, have been recommended.

== COVID-19 ==
Chilblain-like symptoms have also been linked to COVID-19. COVID toes, as they are commonly known, have mostly been reported in older children and adolescents, who often have not had other symptoms of COVID-19. The symptoms are usually mild and disappear without treatment. Their cause is debated: it is uncertain whether COVID toes are a delayed consequence of the viral infection itself or are, at least partially, connected to environmental factors during the COVID-19 pandemic. They may share some of the microscopic features of chilblains caused by lupus. It has been suggested that in the absence of exposure to cold and damp, COVID-19 should be considered as a possible cause of chilblains.

In a study at the dermatology department of Saint-Louis Hospital in Paris, researchers found that most of their study participants carried high levels of autoantibodies, proteins generated by the immune system that inadvertently attack the body's own tissues. Compared with healthy individuals, the participants showed high activity of proteins called type 1 interferons, which switch on pathogen-fighting genes in immune cells.

== See also ==
- Equestrian perniosis
- Erythrocyanosis crurum
- Raynaud's disease
