= Harpist's finger =

Cutaneous condition caused by the repetitive playing of the harp

- Specialty: Dermatology

Harpist's fingers are a skin condition caused by the repetitive playing of the harp.

== See also ==
- Equestrian perniosis
- List of cutaneous conditions
