= Septoria lycopersici =

Scientific classification
- Kingdom: Fungi
- Division: Ascomycota
- Class: Dothideomycetes
- Order: Mycosphaerellales
- Family: Mycosphaerellaceae
- Genus: Septoria
- Species: S. lycopersici

Binomial name
- Septoria lycopersici Speg. (1881)

Species of fungus

Septoria lycopersici is a fungal pathogen that is most commonly found infecting tomatoes. It causes one of the most destructive diseases of tomatoes and attacks tomatoes during any stage of development.

== Host and symptoms ==
Septoria lycopersici infects the tomato leaves via the stomata and also by direct penetration of epidermal cells. Symptoms generally include circular or angular lesions most commonly found on the older, lower leaves of the plant. The lesions are generally 2–5 mm in diameter and have a greyish center with brown margins. The lesions are distinct characteristics of S. lycopersici and contain pycnidia in the center which aid when trying to identify the pathogen. Pycnidia can be found in the center of the said lesions. Pycnidia are fruiting bodies of the fungus. When the lesions become numerous often the leaves turn yellow, then brown, shriveling up and eventually dropping off the plant altogether.

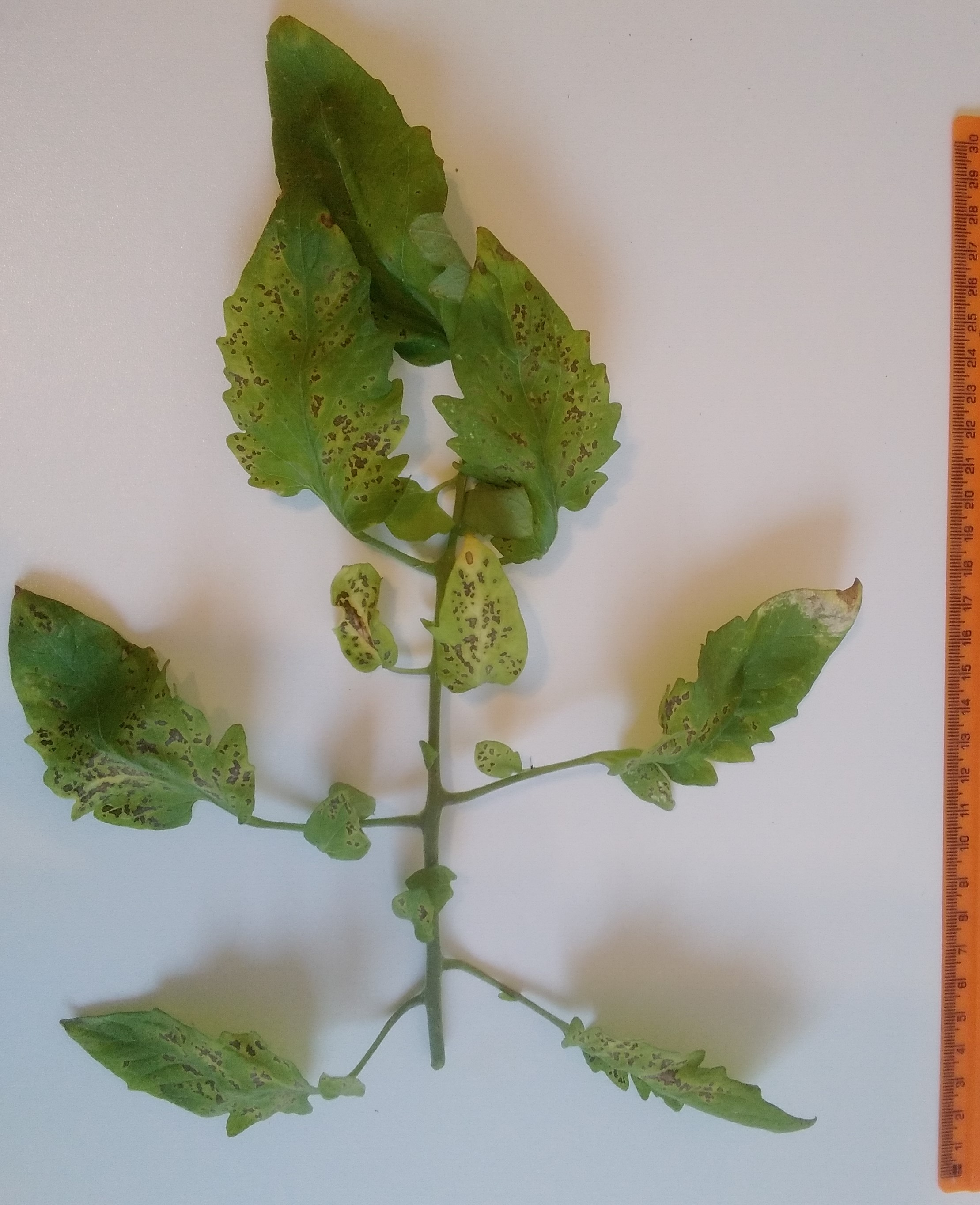
Tomato leaf with septoria leaf spot symptoms of dark spots and yellow surrounding region

== Environment ==
Septoria lycopersici prefers warm, wet, and humid conditions. Disease development occurs within a wide range of temperatures; however, the optimal temperatures lie between 20 and 25 degrees Celsius. High humidity and leaf wetness are also ideal for disease development. The initial source of inoculum for S. lycopersici results from overwintered resting structures such as mycelium and conidia within pycnidia which can be found on and in infected seed and within infected tomato debris left in the field. Spores spread to healthy tomato leaves by windblown water, splashing rain, irrigation, mechanical transmission, and through the activities of insects such as beetles, tomato worms, and aphids. Provided the environment is conducive for disease development, lesions usually develop within 5 days of infection.

== Management ==
The effects of Septoria lycopersici can often be reduced through the implementation of a variety of management techniques. First and foremost, each season should begin as pathogen-free as possible. This can be accomplished by burning or destroying all infected plant tissues to prevent the spread of the primary innoculum. Crop rotation is also encouraged to avoid the re-infection of new foliage from overwintered inoculum. Improving air circulation around the plants through separation of rows and use of cages can also promote faster drying and reduction of splashing, thus reducing the spread of fungal spores. Drip irrigation and mulching also help with the reduction of splashing thus decreasing further inoculum dispersal. Fungicidal sprays should also be considered, though they do not cure already infected leaves, they protect uninfected leaves from becoming infected.
