= Erythema dyschromicum perstans =

- Other names: EDP
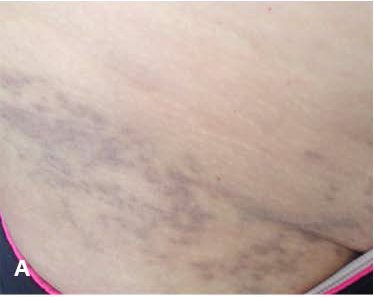
- Presentation of the condition in a 20 year old female.
- Specialty: Dermatology

Erythema dyschromicum perstans (also known as ashy dermatosis, and dermatosis cinecienta) is an uncommon skin condition with peak age of onset being young adults, but it may also be seen in children or adults of any age. EDP is characterized by hyperpigmented macules that are ash-grey in color and may vary in size and shape. While agents such as certain medications, radiographic contrast, pesticides, infection with parasites, and HIV have been implicated in the occurrence of this disease, the cause of this skin disease remains unknown.

EDP initially presents as grey or blue-brown circumferential or irregularly shaped macules or patches that appear. While the lesions of EDP are generally non-elevated, they may initially have a slight raised red margin as they first begin to appear. These lesions usually arise in a symmetric distribution and involve the trunk, but also commonly spread to the face and extremities. EDP does not usually have symptoms beside the macules and patches of discolored skin; however, some itching in these areas may occur.

Because EDP is an uncommon disease of the skin, it is important to consider other skin diseases that may resemble erythema dyschromicum perstans, such as infectious diseases (i.e. leprosy or pinta), reaction to drugs, post inflammatory hyperpigmentation, or lichen planus pigmentosus.

There is no cure for EDP. While multiple various topical and systemic therapies have been tried, none have been consistently successful. In children, spontaneous resolution of EDP over the course of months to years is possible; however, this outcome is less likely if EDP presents in adulthood.

== See also ==
- Lichen planus
- List of cutaneous conditions
