= Fiddler's neck =

- Other names: Violin hickey, viola love bite
- Specialty: Occupational health

Fiddler's neck or violin hickey is an occupational disease that affects violin and viola players.

It is a cutaneous condition usually characterized by redness, thickening, and inflammation on the left side of the neck below the angle of the jaw where the instrument is held. Acne-like lesions and cysts may form at the site due to foreign body reactions, and infections may also occur due to poor hygiene. The primary causes of fiddler's neck are constant friction and local pressure. It is well known among professional orchestra musicians but is "not well recognized by dermatologists", and a red mark on the left side of the neck under the jaw "functions as an identifying sign" of a violinist or violist "in public without seeing the instrument".

Although the presence of fiddler's neck is sometimes used as an indicator of a violinist's skill, or 'battle scars' from constant practice, many violinists never develop fiddler's neck, due to differences in skin sensitivity, playing habits, and the materials used in the construction of the instrument. An accomplished professional player could practice hard their whole life and never develop fiddler's neck.

== Signs and symptoms ==
Fiddler's neck usually involves highly localized lichenification, mild hyperpigmentation, and erythema where the chin rest or instrument body presses against the skin of the neck. Other signs and symptoms include scale buildup, cyst and scar formation, papules and pustules related to local infection, and focal edema. In Blum & Ritter's study in West Germany (1990), they found that 27% of their population had only minor issues, 72% had a palpable mass at the site, and 23% reported pain and other signs of inflammation such as hyperthermia, pulsation, and cystic, pustular, or papular lesions. Size of masses were an average of 2 cm in diameter ranging up to 4 cm, some being associated with purulent drainage, continuous discharge, and crusting. Dystrophic calcinosis cutis has also been reported. Other serious sequelae include sialolithiasis of the submandibular gland and adenolymphoma of the parotid gland.

The histopathology of fiddler's neck frequently shows hyperkeratosis and acanthosis, along with plugging of follicles. Histiocytic infiltration with granulomas to foreign body and follicular cysts are also common. Foreign body granulomas are thought to derive from abrasion of the wooden surface of the chin rest and its absorption into the superficial dermis. The location and complex mechanism of causation for fiddler's neck give rise to a wider spectrum of skin changes when compared to contact dermatitis from more common irritants. Fiddler's neck can be differentiated from rosacea and sarcoid reaction with granulomas.

== Causes ==
The proximal causes of fiddler's neck are friction and pressure, but both repetitive shearing stress and occlusion with consequent trapping of sweat give rise to progressive damage. This damage along with poor hygiene predisposes the area to local infection, and such infection can progress to scarring and other long-term effects. Hot weather is reported to exacerbate fiddler's neck, as are tiredness, playing emotional music, and playing in smaller groups where individual stress is higher. Type I hypersensitivity reactions may also be involved, particularly to rosewood and ebony in the chinrest and tailpiece, as well as to varnish of the instrument body when chinrests are not used and to rosin deposits on the instrument and on chin cloths. Nickel or other metal allergies are common causes if the chin rest has a metal clip that comes into constant contact with the skin. Rosin exposure in particular may lead to abietic acid dermatitis.

== Diagnosis ==
=== Differential diagnoses ===
The differential diagnoses of fiddler's neck include branchial cleft cyst, disease of the salivary glands, tumors of the parotid gland, psoriasis, lichen planus, contact dermatitis, herpes simplex and similar infections, and insect bites and stings especially from fleas.

== Treatment ==
Treatment for fiddler's neck is unnecessary if it is painless and shows minimal swelling, particularly since minor cases are taken as a mark of pride. But fiddler's neck may lead to worse disorders. The primary methods of treatment involve adjustments to playing of the instrument:

- good hygiene for the affected area and for the instrument
- use of a clean cotton cloth that is changed frequently
- use of a comfortable pad to absorb sweat and reduce friction between the instrument and skin
- use of a shoulder rest to reduce pressure below the jaw
- a suitable chin rest, especially one carved or molded for the individual
- covering or changing potentially allergenic materials on the instrument.
- shifting the chin rest to the center of the body over the tailpiece
- smoothing coarse surfaces to reduce abrasion
- for males, growing a beard to avoid folliculitis

Surgery is necessary for sialolithiasis, parotid tumors, and cysts. Cervical lymph nodes that are larger than 1 cm must be biopsied. Connective tissue can be removed by excision when a non-inflamed mass is large, and there is generally little recurrence. Infections should be treated conservatively, and causative species should be identified through smear and culture for appropriate antibiotic selection. Reduction of playing time may be helpful for cases without inflammation, but in 30% of cases this did not improve the symptoms.

== Prevalence ==
Fiddler's neck does not usually form unless the musician is practicing or playing for more than a few hours each day, and only seems to develop after a few years of serious playing. Thus, when not infected or otherwise problematic, fiddler's neck may be known as a benign practice mark and may be worn proudly as an indication of long hours of practice. Blum & Ritter (1990) found that 62% of 523 professional violinists and violists in West Germany experienced fiddler's neck, with the percentage among violists being higher (67%) than among violinists (59%). Viola players are believed to be more predisposed to developing fiddler's neck than violinists because the viola is larger and heavier, but this has not been empirically confirmed.

The development of fiddler's neck does not depend on preexisting skin problems, and Blum & Ritter find that only 23% of men and 14% of women in their study reported cutaneous disorders in other parts of the face (mainly acne and eczema) that were independent of playing the violin or viola. Fiddler's neck may exacerbate existing acne, but acne may also be limited solely to the lesion and not appear elsewhere. Nonetheless, musicians with underlying dermatologic diseases like acne and eczema are more endangered by fiddler's neck than others. Males may develop folliculitis or boils due to involvement of beard hair.
