= List of hop diseases =

This article is a list of diseases of hops (Humulus lupulus).

== Bacterial diseases ==
Bacterial diseases
Bacterial disease	Corynebacterium sp.
Crown gall	Agrobacterium tumefaciens

== Fungal diseases ==
Fungal diseases
Alternaria cone disorder	Alternaria alternata = Alternaria tenuis
Armillaria root rot (shoestring root rot)	Armillaria mellea Rhizomorpha subcorticalis [anamorph]
Black root rot	Phytophthora citricola = Phytophthora cactorum var. applanata
Canker	Fusarium sambucinum Gibberella pulicaris [teleomorph]
Downy mildew	Pseudoperonospora humuli
Gray mold	Botrytis cinerea Botryotinia fuckeliana [teleomorph]
Leaf spots	Septoria humuli = Ascochyta humuli Mycocentrospora cantuariensis = Cercospora cantuariensis
Phoma wilt	Phoma herbarum
Powdery mildew	Podosphaera macularis = Sphaerotheca macularis = Sphaerotheca humuli
Rosellinia root rot (Dematophora root rot)	Rosellinia necatrix Dematophora necatrix [anamorph]
Sclerotinia wilt	Sclerotinia sclerotiorum
Verticillium wilt	Verticillium nonalfalfae

== Miscellaneous diseases and disorders ==
Miscellaneous diseases and disorders
Aphid blight (hop aphid)	Phorodon humuli
Chlorotic disease	Undetermined
Red spider (two-spotted spider mite)	Tetranychus urticae
Small hop	Undetermined
Sooty mold	Several fungal species including Cladosporium spp. (surface molds only, not pathogens)
Weevil, clay colored	Otiorhynchus singularis

== Nematodes, parasitic ==
Nematodes, parasitic
Cyst (eelworm)	Heterodera humuli
Dagger	Xiphinema diversicaudatum Xiphinema americanum
Root-knot	Meloidogyne hapla Meloidogyne incognita Meloidogyne javanica

== Virus and viroid diseases ==
Virus and viroid diseases
American hop latent	American hop latent virus (AHLV)
Hop latent	Hop latent virus Hop latent viroid (HLVd)
Hop mosaic	Apple mosaic virus Hop mosaic virus (HpMV)
Nettlehead Split leaf blotch	Arabis mosaic virus
Ringspot	Prunus necrotic ringspot virus
(Stunting)	Citrus bark cracking viroid (CBCVd) Hop stunt viroid (HSVd)
