= Humulus lupulus =

Common hop

Conservation status
- Least Concern (IUCN 3.1) (Europe regional assessment)

- Secure (NatureServe)

Scientific classification
- Kingdom: Plantae
- Clade: Tracheophytes
- Clade: Angiosperms
- Clade: Eudicots
- Clade: Rosids
- Order: Rosales
- Family: Cannabaceae
- Genus: Humulus
- Species: H. lupulus

Binomial name
- Humulus lupulus L.

Synonyms
- Humulus cordifolius Miq.; Humulus volubilis Salisb. nom. illeg.; Humulus vulgaris Gilib.; Lupulus amarus Gilib.; Lupulus communis Gaertn.; Lupulus humulus Mill.; Lupulus scandens Lam. nom. illeg.

Species of flowering plant

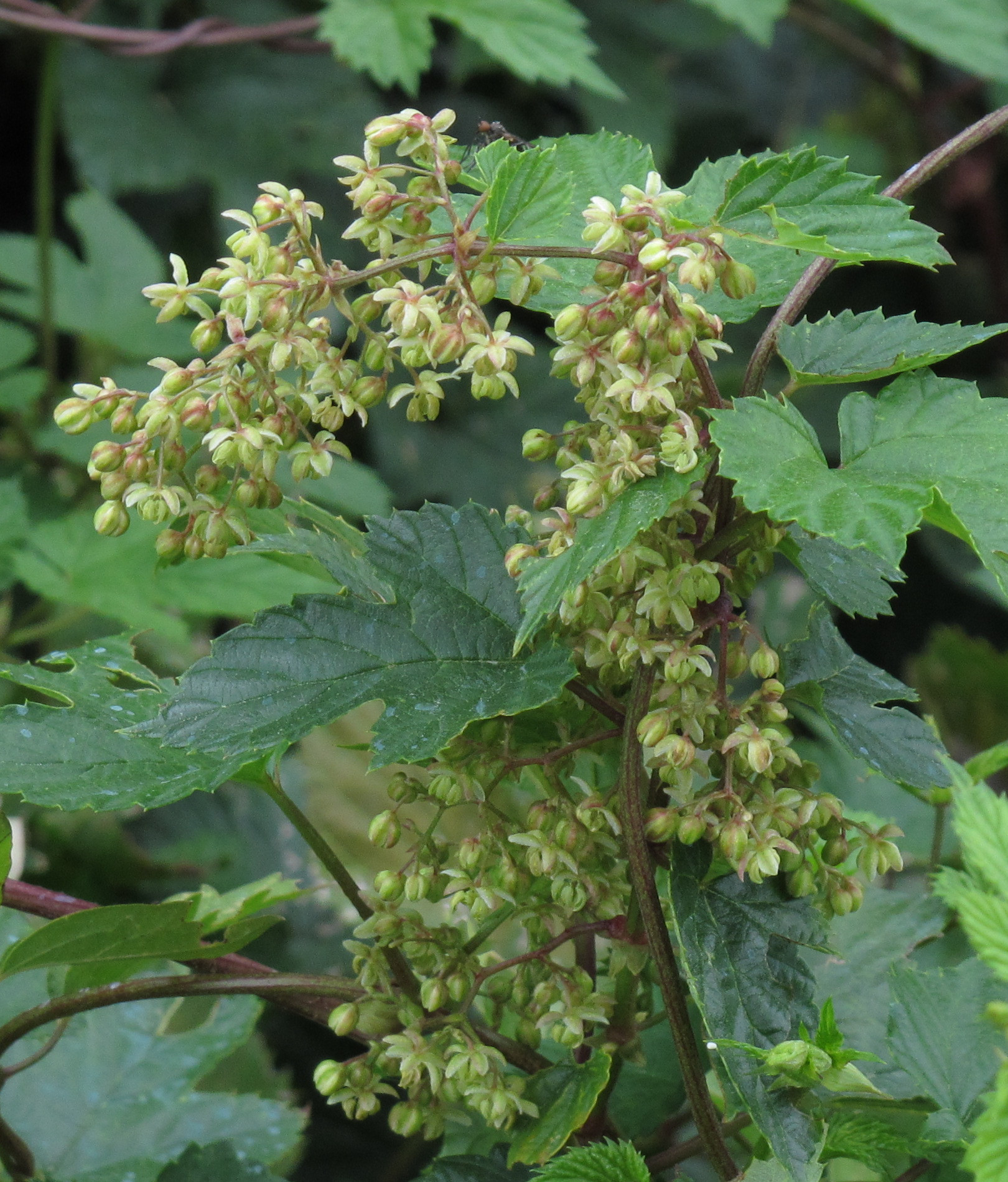
male inflorescences

Humulus lupulus, the common hop or hops, is a species of flowering plant in the hemp family, Cannabaceae. It is a perennial, herbaceous climbing plant which sends up new shoots in early spring and dies back to a cold-hardy rhizome in autumn. It is dioecious (having separate male and female plants) and native to West Asia, Europe and North America.

As the female cone-shaped flowers (hops) are used to preserve and flavor beer, the species is widely cultivated for the brewing industry.

== Description ==
Humulus lupulus is a perennial herbaceous plant up to 10 metres (33 feet) tall, living up to 20 years. It has simple leaves with 3–5 deep lobes that can be opposite or alternate. The species is triggered by the longer summer days to flower, usually around July or August in the Northern Hemisphere. The plant is dioecious, with male and female flowers on separate plants. The fragrant flowers are wind-pollinated. The staminate (male) flowers do not have petals, while the pistillate (female) flowers have petals enveloping the fruit. The female flower cones (or strobili) are known as hops. The fruit is an achene, meaning that it is dry and does not split open at maturity. The achene is surrounded by tepals and lupulin-secreting glands are concentrated on the fruit.

The species is sometimes described as a bine rather than a vine because it has stiff downward facing hairs that provide stability and allow it to climb.

=== Chemistry ===
H. lupulus contains myrcene, humulene, xanthohumol, myrcenol and linalool, as well as less defined tannins and resin.

Hops are unique for containing secondary metabolites, flavonoids, oils, and polyphenols that impact the flavor of the products they are common in, such as beer. The bitter flavors in hops can be accounted for by acids composed of prenylated polyketides (a group of secondary metabolites), which highly impact the taste of hop-based products. Multiple genes have been identified as factors in the expression of taste including O-methyltransferase 1, geranyl diphosphate synthase, and chalcone synthase. Genomic analyses have shown evidence that the intervention of humans in the selection process of the hop over the thousands of years it has been cultivated have provided noticeable enhancements in aroma and bitterness as well as selection of varieties with high yield rates.

==== Flowering, growth, and stress response ====
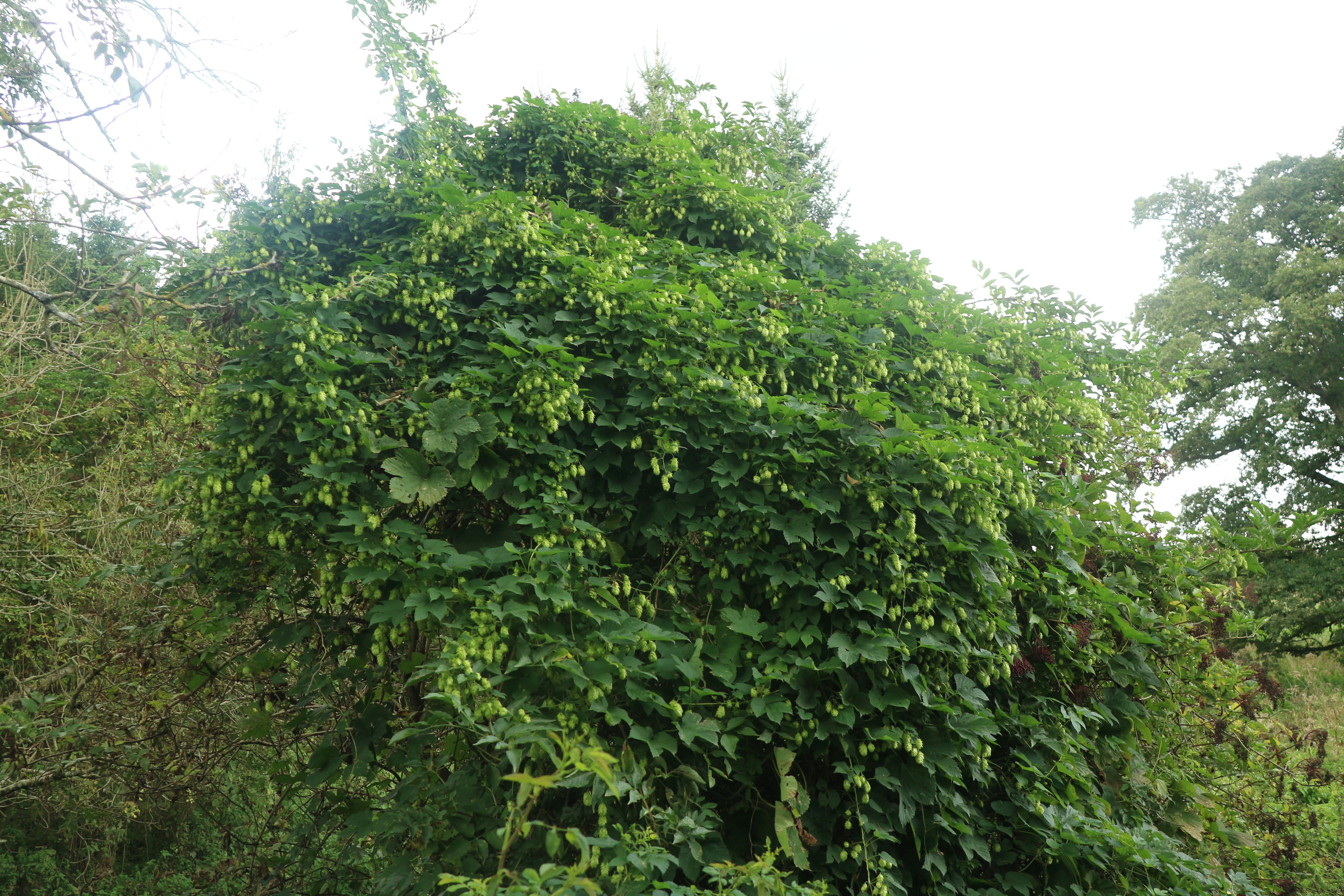
Humulus lupulus, in Kent, England. Taken in late August, showing light-green cones.

Predicted genes in homologous primary contigs have been identified as accounting for various traits expressed via variation in the growth, flowering, and stress responses in the plant. These homologous primary contigs correspond to regions with large amounts of sequence variation. Genes in the hop that contain higher rates of sequence divergence in homologous primary contigs (overlapping DNA sequences inherited by a common ancestor) have been attributed to the expression of flowering, growth and responses to (both abiotic and biotic) stress in the plant. The responses to stress are thought to manifest in the distinct differences and difficulties in the cultivation processes between geographically popular varieties of the hop plant. Outside environmental stress, such as changes in temperature and water availability has also been shown to significantly alter the transcriptome and incite reductions in genes known to be involved in the synthesis of secondary metabolites (including bitter acids), which are organic compounds produced that do not impact development or reproduction of hops. Environmental stress has also been shown to reduce expression of the valerophenone synthase gene, which is known to be an essential genetic component in the regulation of bitter acid production. This shows that impacts of outside stress on H. lupulus likely has a direct implication of the expression of the bitter flavor that remains an essential component of the popularity of the plant.

==== Research ====
- Humulus lupulus contains xanthohumol, which is converted by large intestine bacteria into the phytoestrogen 8-prenylnaringenin, which may have a relative binding affinity to estrogen receptors as well as potentiating effects on GABA_{A} receptor activity
- Humulus lupulus extract is antimicrobial, an activity which has been exploited in the manufacture of natural deodorant.
- Spent H. lupulus extract has also been shown to have antimicrobial and anti-biofilm activities, raising the possibility this waste product of the brewing industry could be developed for medical applications.
- Extracts of the bitter alpha-acids present in H. lupulus have been shown to decrease nocturnal activity, acting as a sleep aide, in certain concentrations.

Because of the growing understanding regarding the hop's overlap in gene structures with cannabidiolic acid synthase, the precursor structure to cannabidiol, there is a gap in general understanding about potential unknown compounds and benefits in hops. As the understanding of the health benefits available in cannabidiol increases, there is a growing demand to further investigate the overlap between cannabidiolic acid synthase and H. lupulus.

===== Limitations =====
The genome of H. lupulus is relatively large and has been shown to be a similar size to the human genome. The complexity of the hop genome has made it difficult to understand and identify unknown genetic properties, however with the growing availability of accessible sequencing, there is room for more advanced understanding of the plant. Because of the growing concern of climate change, and the assumption that there will be an increase of heat waves, it is likely that growing large yields of hops could become more difficult. This could result in changes to the transcriptome of the hop, or result in a decrease of certain varieties, leaving less room for further research.

== Taxonomy ==
=== Relation to Cannabis sativa ===
The hop is within the same family of plants such as hemp and marijuana, called Cannabaceae. The hop plant diverged from Cannabis sativa over 20 million years ago and has evolved to be three times the physical size. The hop and C. sativa are estimated to have approximately a 73% overlap in genomic content. The overlap between enzymes includes polyketide synthases and prenyltransferases. The hop and C. sativa also have significant overlap in the cannabidiolic acid synthase gene, which is expressed in the tissues of the leaves in both plants.

=== Varieties ===
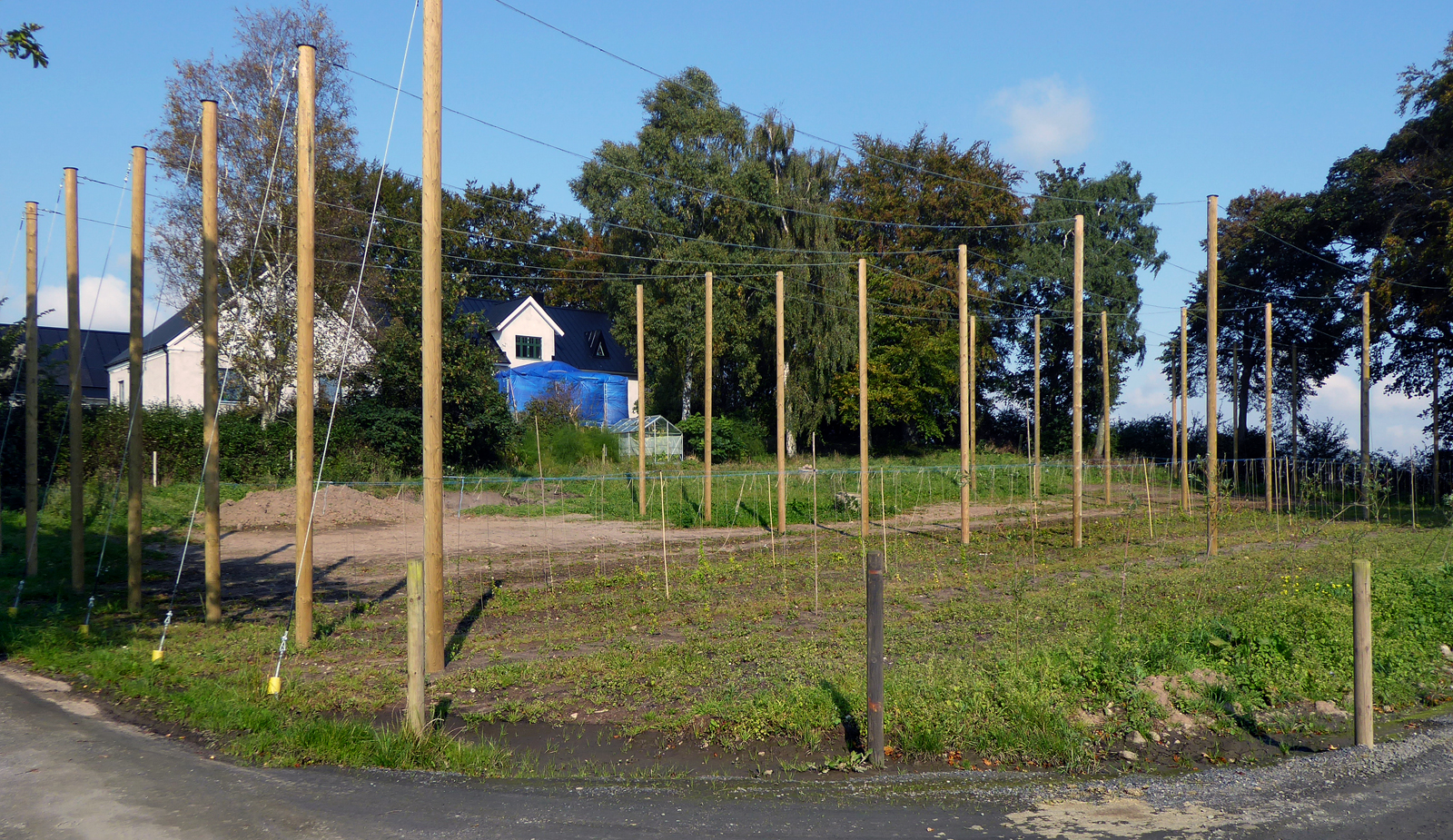
Cultivation of hops in Ystad, Sweden 2017

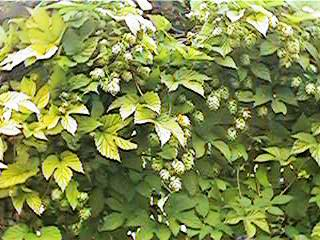
'Golden' hop

The five varieties of this species (Humulus lupulus) are:

- H. l. var. lupulus – Europe, western Asia
- H. l. var. cordifolius – eastern Asia
- H. l. var. lupuloides (syn. H. americanus) – eastern North America
- H. l. var. neomexicanus – western North American.
- H. l. var. pubescens – midwestern and eastern North America

Many cultivars are found in the list of hop varieties. A yellow-leafed ornamental cultivar, Humulus lupulus 'Aureus', is cultivated for garden use. It is also known as golden hop, and holds the Royal Horticultural Society's Award of Garden Merit (AGM).

=== Etymology ===
The genus name Humulus is a medieval name that was at some point Latinized after being borrowed from a Germanic source exhibiting the h•m•l consonant cluster, as in Middle Low German homele.

According to Soviet Iranist Vasily Abaev this could be a word of Sarmatian origin which is present in the modern Ossetian language (Iron Ossetic: Хуымæллæг) and derives from proto-Iranian hauma-arayka, an Aryan haoma.

From Sarmatian dialects this word spread across Eurasia, thus creating a group of related words in Turkic, Finno-Ugric, Slavic and Germanic languages (see Russian: хмель, Chuvash хăмла, Finnish humala, Hungarian komló, Mordovian комла, Avar хомеллег).

The specific epithet lupulus is Latin for "small wolf". The name refers to the plant's tendency to strangle other plants, mainly osiers or basket willows (Salix viminalis), like a wolf does a sheep. Hops could be seen growing over these willows so often that it was named the willow-wolf.

The English word hop is derived from the Middle Dutch word hoppe, also meaning Humulus lupulus.

== Distribution and habitat ==
The plant is native to Europe, western Asia and North America.

It grows best in the latitude range of 38°–51° in full sun with moderate amounts of rainfall.

== Ecology ==
The flowers attract butterflies, amongst other insects.

=== Animal users ===
- Damson hop aphid (Phorodon humuli)
- Two spotted spider mite (Tetranychus urticae)
- Japanese beetle (Popillia japonica)
- Comma butterfly (Polygonia c-album)
- Pale tussock moth (Calliteara pudibunda)
- Currant pug moth (Eupithecia assimilata)
- Buttoned snout moth (Hypena rostralis)
- Buff ermine moth (Spilosoma lutea)
- Spotted lanternfly (Lycorma delicatula)

=== Diseases ===
- Downy mildew (Pseudoperonospora humuli)
- Powdery mildew (Podosphaera macularis)

== Toxicity ==
H. lupulus can cause dermatitis to some who handle them. It is estimated that about 1 in 30 people are affected by this.

== Uses ==
=== In alcohol brewing ===
H. lupulus is first mentioned in 768 CE when King Pepin donated hops to a monastery in Paris. Cultivation was first recorded in 859 CE, in documents from a monastery in Freising, Germany.

The chemical compounds found in H. lupulus are the main components in flavoring and bittering beer. The fragrant flower cones, known as hops, impart a bitter flavor and also have aromatic and preservative qualities. Some other compounds help with creating foam in beer. Chemicals such as linalool and aldehydes contribute to the flavor of beer. The main components of bitterness in beer are iso-alpha acids, with many other compounds contributing to beer's overall bitterness. Until the Middle Ages, many varieties of plant were used to flavor beer, including most commonly Myrica gale. H. lupulus became favored because it contains preserving agents which prolong the viability of a brew.

=== Outside alcohol production ===
Buds or hops of Humulus lupulus are used in Iranian ethnomedicine as a sedative.

== In culture ==
H. lupulus was voted the county flower of Kent in 2002 following a poll by the wild flora conservation charity Plantlife.
