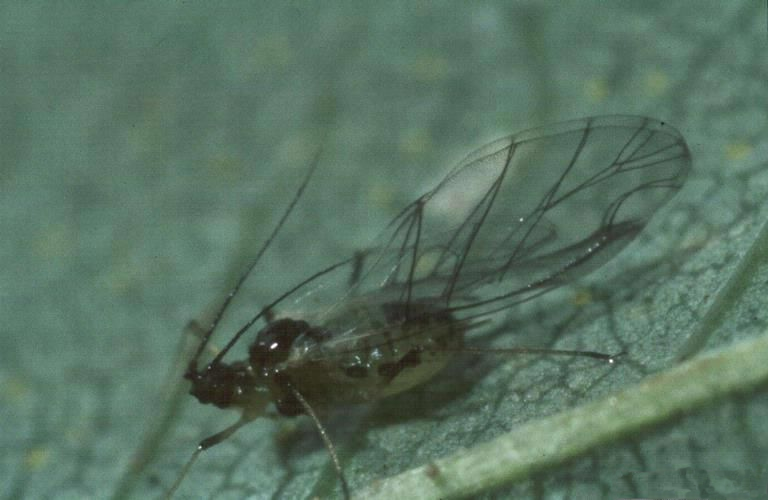

Scientific classification
- Kingdom: Animalia
- Phylum: Arthropoda
- Class: Insecta
- Order: Hemiptera
- Suborder: Sternorrhyncha
- Family: Aphididae
- Genus: Phorodon
- Species: P. humuli

Binomial name
- Phorodon humuli (Schrank, 1801)

Synonyms
- Myzus humuli

= Phorodon humuli =

Species of true bug

Phorodon humuli, the hop aphid, or damson-hop aphid, is an aphid in the superfamily Aphidoidea in the order Hemiptera. It is a true bug and sucks sap.

== Host plants ==
Hop aphids are hosted by different plants in summer and winter. In winter, they are known to be hosted by Prunus sp. such as, Prunus domestica, Prunus spinosa, Prunus padus, and Prunus cerasifera. During summer, they are hosted by Humulus lupulus, Humulus japonicus, and Urtica dioica.

== See also ==
- Podosphaera macularis - hop powdery mildew
- Pseudoperonospora humuli - hop downy mildew
- Verticillium nonalfalfae - hop wilt
- List of hop diseases
