= Phoma wilt =

Fungal disease of the common hop plant

Phoma wilt is a disease of the common hop plant caused by several species of fungal plant pathogens in the genus Phoma. These include Phoma herbarum and Phoma exigua, and possibly other as yet unidentified species. Phoma infection may cause decreased yields, but Phoma wilt is not considered to be a very common or destructive disease of the hop plant.

== Hosts and symptoms ==
Phoma herbarum and P. exigua have both been found to have wide host specificity, although the hop plant appears to be the only common host of the two. There have not been any indications found of cultivar specificity, although hop yards established for a longer time may have a higher risk of Phoma infection. Symptoms of infection typically begin with small chlorotic leaf spots and develop into greyish brown lesions that have a distinct target or concentric ring appearance. In some instances, the lesions may also be greyish white in color. Infection of the hop cones will produce brown or red discoloration covering some or all of the bracts of the hop cone. This discoloration is an indication of necrosis on the cones. The plant may also develop cankers or wilt, but this is not seen in all cases. Phoma wilt of hops may be diagnosed by its characteristic symptoms or by isolation and DNA sequencing of the pathogen against known genomes.

Interestingly, P. herbarum and P. exigua have also both been considered as bioherbicide agents against some species of broadleaf weeds.

== Disease cycle ==
Phoma wilt in hops has been found to be spread by pycnidiospores. These asexual spores are released from mature pycnidia in a matrix which may appear white or pink. Dissemination occurs largely by rain splash, wind, or misting, but spores may also be carried by bird or insect vectors from plant to plant. Infection, which typically becomes evident in late Summer, may occur by spores entering through stomata or wounds in the plant but may also enter directly through the epidermis. Spores will then bud and divide, and hyphae will branch out. The initial infection is symptom-less as the pathogen spreads. However, once the pathogen becomes necrotrophic, necrotic lesions will appear. Pycnidia formation begins with hyphae near the epidermis in lesions forming a cavity followed by the production of dark hyphal cells. The aggregation will continue to grow in size until it is mature. Spore production starts from the inner cells of the pycnidia, and stalks of spores project inward in columns from those cells. Spores are oblong and generally measure approximately 5.0 x 2.5 μm. There is no sexual stage for either P. herbarum or P. exigua that has been identified, but many other species of Phoma have been found with a Didymalla teleomorph.

In the absence of a host, P. herbarum and P. exigua can act saprophytically survive in plant debris or decaying material.

== Environment ==
Phoma wilt of hops generally requires rain for dissemination by rain splash, but there is some evidence that it may thrive from periods of dryness with interspersed, shorter periods of wetness. Repeatedly growing hops in the same area where Phoma wilt occurred previously increases disease incidence rate, as the pathogen is able to survive in debris and material on the ground. There is also evidence that birds and insects which frequent the hop plant may act as transient vectors of the disease.

== Management ==
There are currently no specific management techniques described for Phoma Wilt in Hops. However, several methods have been proposed. The simplest cultural method is the removal of plant debris from hop yards which may help reduce the spread of the disease as well as initial infection in new stock. This functions by effectively removing any resting spores, pycnidia, or saprophytic pathogen. Any diseased plants or plant material should also be removed. Because the disease prefers moist condition for dissemination, it may also be helpful to ensure hop plants have adequate airflow. This likely, not an issue though due to the way hop vines are guided upward on wires. It is also important to water the hop plants from the ground as opposed to misting or sprinkler type systems which will create or prolong a moist environment where the pathogen can thrive. Because the pathogen is also able to survive in the soil, growing a non-host plant in the area for 4+ years could be used to halt future infection; however, the longevity of the hop plant rhizome may reduce the efficiency of this cultural practice. Sterile practice should also be used when pruning, transporting, or propagating stock to impede the spread of the pathogen. There are fungicides available that have an action against the Phoma species seen in hops, but none specifically registered for Phoma wilt in hops, though chemical treatments have been proposed for the treatment of the disease. These include tebuconazole, trifloxystrobin, fosetyl-Al, and copper hydroxide for their action against fungi in general. Tebuconazole is a systemic fungicide which interferes with membrane functions and pathogen survival within the hop plant. The fungicide trifloxystrobin acts by interfering with some aspects of fungal pathogen respiration, resulting in the inhibition of both growth and spore germination. This functionally stops the initial infection or subsequent growth. Fosetyl-Al has a less distinct mode of action, likely having fungicidal properties by stimulating defense mechanisms in the host plant itself. Fosetyl-Al may therefore help decrease the spread of the Phoma infection in hop plant tissues, but this has yet to be studied more closely. Copper hydroxide is a widely used foliar applied fungicide which denatures proteins on the plant surface and inhibits pathogen forced entry. This may not be completely effective against Phoma, as it is also able to enter through wounds and natural openings.
