= Gibberella pulicaris =

Scientific classification
- Kingdom: Fungi
- Division: Ascomycota
- Class: Sordariomycetes
- Order: Hypocreales
- Family: Nectriaceae
- Genus: Gibberella
- Species: G. pulicaris

Binomial name
- Gibberella pulicaris (Fr.) Sacc. (1877)

Synonyms
- Botryosphaeria pulicaris Fusarium sambucinum Gibbera pulicaris Nectria pulicaris Sphaeria pulicaris

Species of fungus

Gibberella pulicaris is a fungal plant pathogen infecting several hosts including potato, strawberry, hop, alfalfa and Douglas-fir.

== Synonyms ==
- Sphaeria pulicaris Fr., Mykologische Hefte 2: 37 (1823) [MB#239256]
- Gibbera pulicaris (Fr.) Fr., Summa vegetabilium Scandinaviae 2: 402 (1849) [MB#190097]
- Botryosphaeria pulicaris (Fr.) Ces. & De Not. (1863) [MB#184344]
- Nectria pulicaris (Fr.) Tul. & C. Tul., Selecta Fungorum Carpologia: Nectriei- Phacidiei- Pezizei 3: 63 (1865) [MB#465479]
- Cucurbitaria pulicaris (Fr.) Quél., Mémoires de la Société d'Émulation de Montbéliard sér. 2, 5: 511 (1875) [MB#504675]
- Sphaeria cyanogena Desm., Annales des Sciences Naturelles Botanique sér. 3, 10: 352 (1848) [MB#199264]
