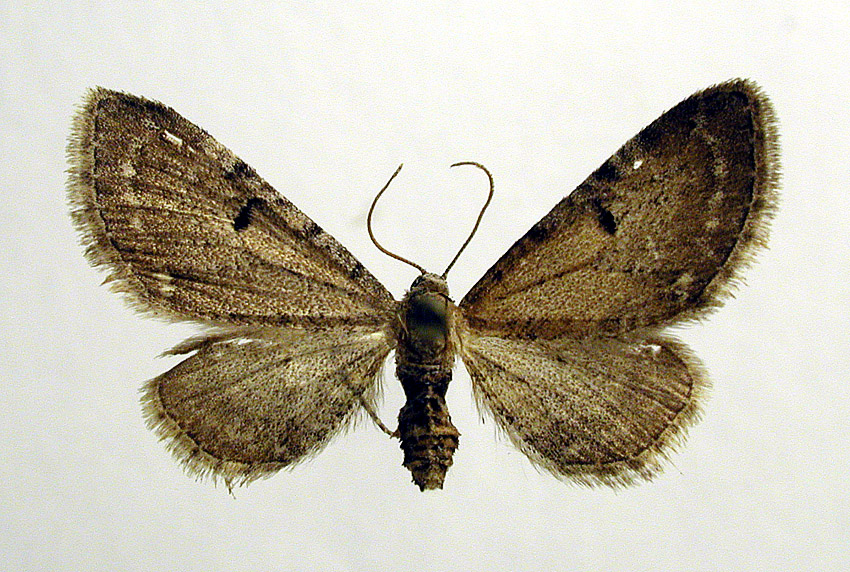

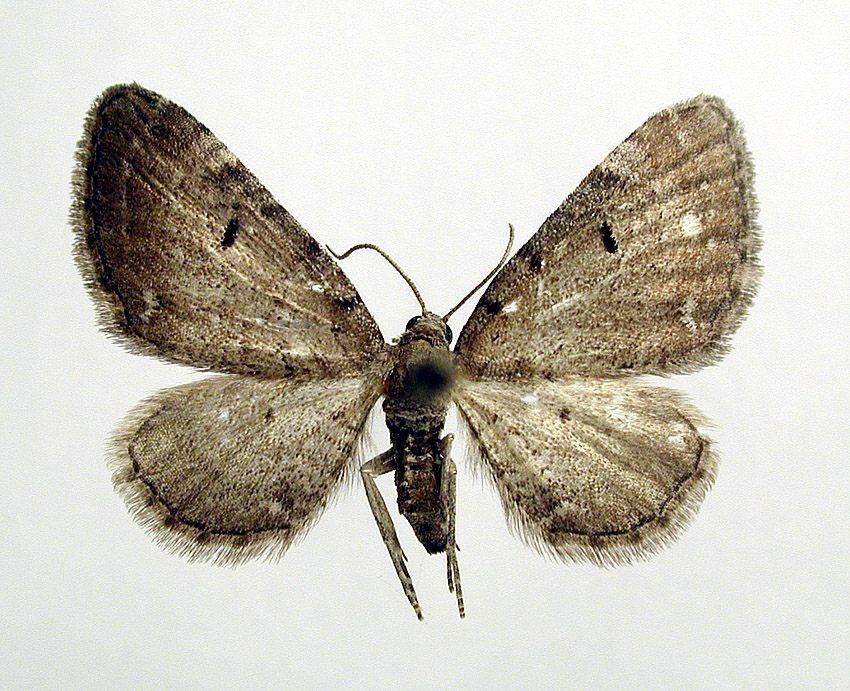
- Form goossensiata

Scientific classification
- Domain: Eukaryota
- Kingdom: Animalia
- Phylum: Arthropoda
- Class: Insecta
- Order: Lepidoptera
- Family: Geometridae
- Genus: Eupithecia
- Species: E. absinthiata

Binomial name
- Eupithecia absinthiata (Clerck, 1759)

Synonyms
- Phalaena absinthiata Clerck, 1759; Eupithecia callunae Speyer, 1867; Eupithecia coagulata Guenée, 1857; Phalaena elongata Haworth, 1809; Eupithecia elongata; Eupithecia geminata Packard, 1873; Eupithecia goossensiata Mabille, 1869; Eupithecia knautiata Gregson, 1874; Eupithecia meritata Pearsall, 1908; Geometra minutata Denis & Schiffermüller, 1775; Eupithecia minutata; Eupithecia notata Stephens, 1831; Eupithecia packardata Taylor, 1907; Eupithecia catharinae Vojnits, 1969

= Wormwood pug =

Species of moth

The wormwood pug (Eupithecia absinthiata) is a moth of the family Geometridae. The species was first described by Carl Alexander Clerck in 1759. It is a common species across the Palearctic region as well as North America.

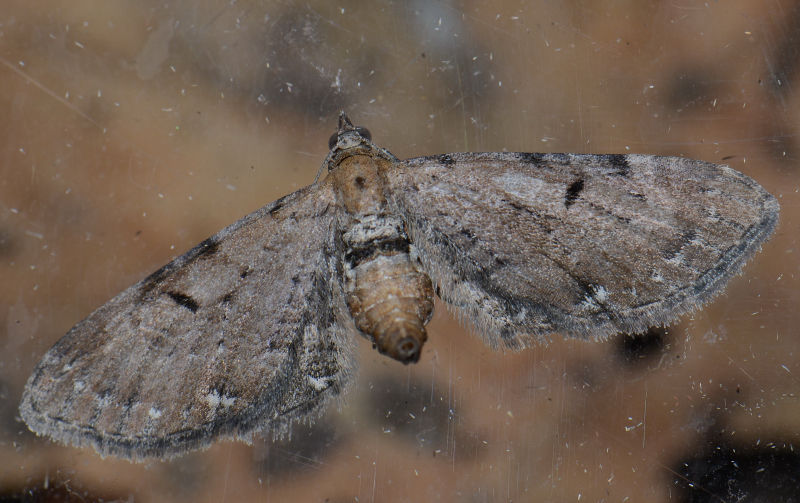

The wingspan is 21–23 mm and the forewings are warm brown with two black spots along the costa with a black discal spot completing a distinctive triangle. There is a pale narrow line near the fringe with a distinct whitish spot near the tornus, although this is not as prominent as in the rather similar currant pug. The hindwings are greyish brown.ab. obscura Dietze (Kassimov, Central Russia) is much darker, the forewing described as sepia-coloured.

Adult larvae are smooth and elongated. They adapt to the basic colour of the respective food plant and are accordingly greenish, cream-colored or brownish colored and usually show a reddish-brown diamond-like pattern on the back. Sometimes light green, almost unmarked specimens also appear. The yellow-brown pupa is provided with greenish wing sheaths. At the cremaster there are eight hook bristles, the middle pair of which is strongly formed.

Eupithecia absinthiata requires examination of a genital preparation for certain identification.

The species flies at night in June and July and is attracted to light.

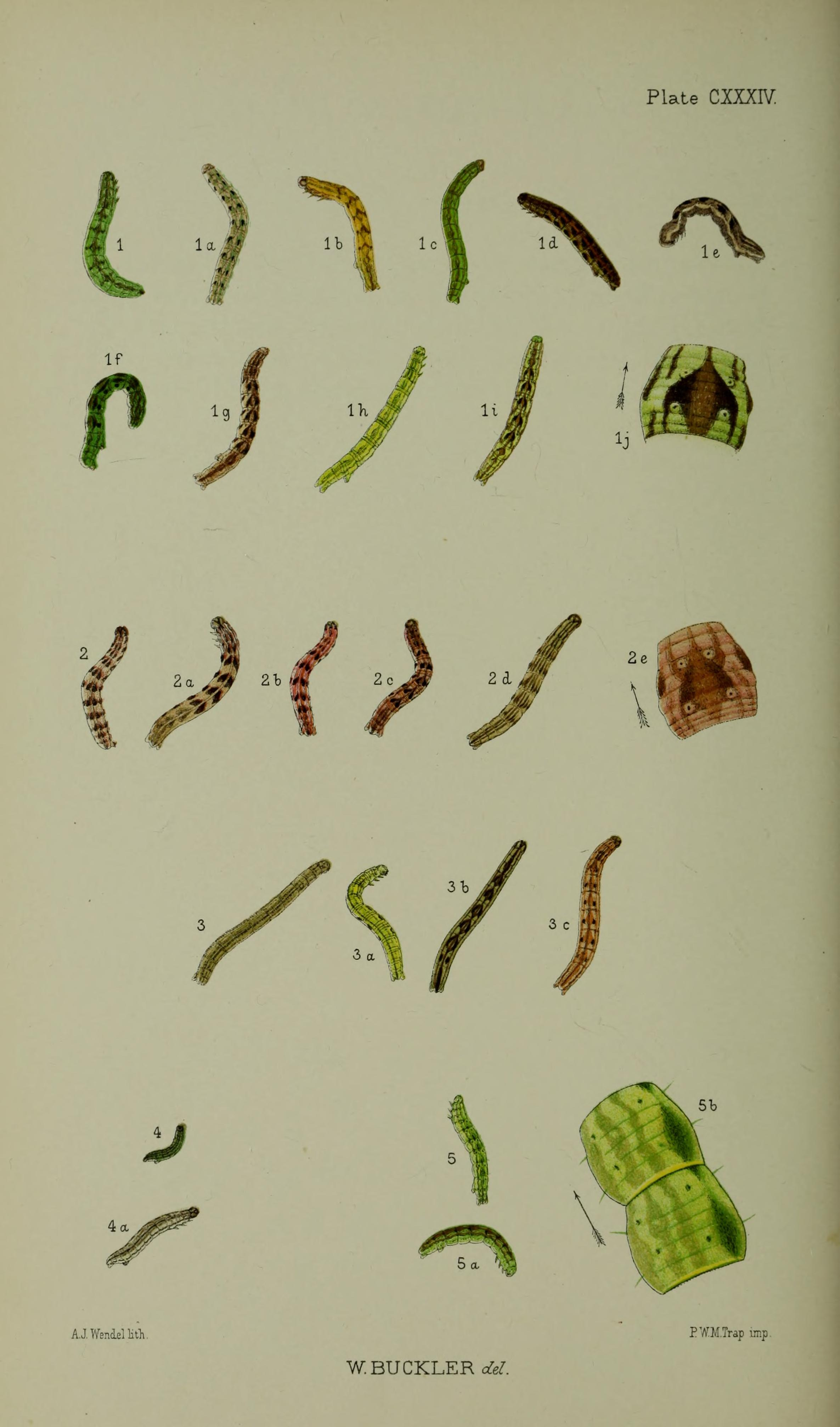
Figs 1,1a 1b,1c,1d,1e,1f,1g,!h 1i larvae after final moult 1j enlarged detail of segments- as E. minutata Figs 2,2a, 2b, 2c, 2d larvae after final moult 2e enlarged detail of segment

As the name suggests, the larva feeds on the flowers of mugwort (which is sometimes called "common wormwood"), but it will also feed on the flowers of a range of other plants (see list below). The species overwinters as a pupa.

== Larval food plants ==
- Achillea
- Aconitum
- Artemisia
- Aster
- Calluna – heather
- Cirsium – creeping thistle
- Erica
- Eupatorium
- Pimpinella – burnet-saxifrage
- Senecio
- Solidago – goldenrod
- Tanacetum
- Tripleurospermum – Mayweed

== Similar species ==
- Eupithecia assimilata.
- Eupithecia expallidata
