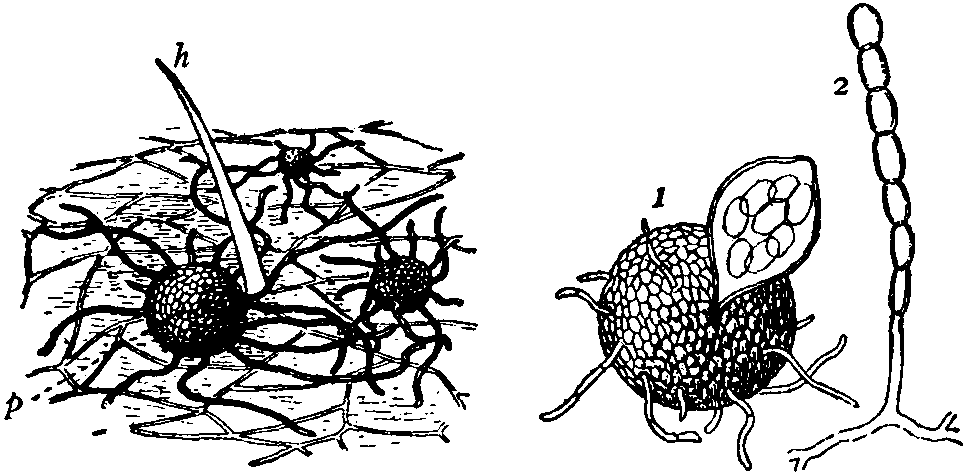

Scientific classification
- Kingdom: Fungi
- Division: Ascomycota
- Class: Leotiomycetes
- Order: Helotiales
- Family: Erysiphaceae
- Genus: Podosphaera
- Species: P. macularis

Binomial name
- Podosphaera macularis (Wallr.) U. Braun & S. Takam., (2000)

Synonyms
- Alphitomorpha macularis Desetangsia humuli Erysiphe humuli Erysiphe macularis Sphaerotheca humuli Sphaerotheca macularis (Wallr.) Lind, (1913); Sphaerotheca macularis (Ehrh.) Magnus, (1899)

= Podosphaera macularis =

Species of fungus

Podosphaera macularis (formerly Sphaerotheca macularis) is an ascomycete fungus that causes powdery mildew of hops. It is only known to be pathogenic on hop plants, including both ornamental and wild hops, and hemp.

== Taxonomy ==
The pathogen that causes powdery mildew of hops was once considered to be Sphaerotheca macularis, which is capable of infecting many plants; in 2000, the pathogen that causes powdery mildew of hops was taxonomically classified as Podosphaera macularis.

== Distribution ==
P. macularis can be found in most hop growing regions in the northern hemisphere. Powdery mildew is one of the oldest fungal diseases known on cultivated hop, dating back to reports in England from the 1700s, and has been recorded in eastern North America since at least the early 19th century. It was partly responsible for the decline of the hop industry in New York state. The fungus was first reported in the Pacific Northwest of the United States in June 1997 and powdery mildew is now epidemic annually in this region, where 98% of US hops are grown. As of 2020, only the MAT1-1 mating type was known in the Pacific Northwest suggesting there has only been one introduction there, whereas in Europe and eastern North America both mating types are present. This is important as in the latter case the fungus can overwinter as chasmothecia (fruiting bodies) on dead leaves and cones; if only one mating type is present it must overwinter as mycelium on living host tissue such as crown buds that lead to heavily-infected “flag shoots” in the following season, although these are rare (<1% of plants).

== Symptoms ==
When disease does occur, early symptoms include chlorotic spots on the leaves of hop plants. Spots may fade to gray or white as the season progresses. Signs include white clusters of hyphae, which are often present on the leaves, and in some cases can infect the cone itself. If this infection occurs, a brown, necrotic lesion may develop. When both mating types exist within a population, chleistothecia can form and are visible as small, black dots on the undersides of leaves.

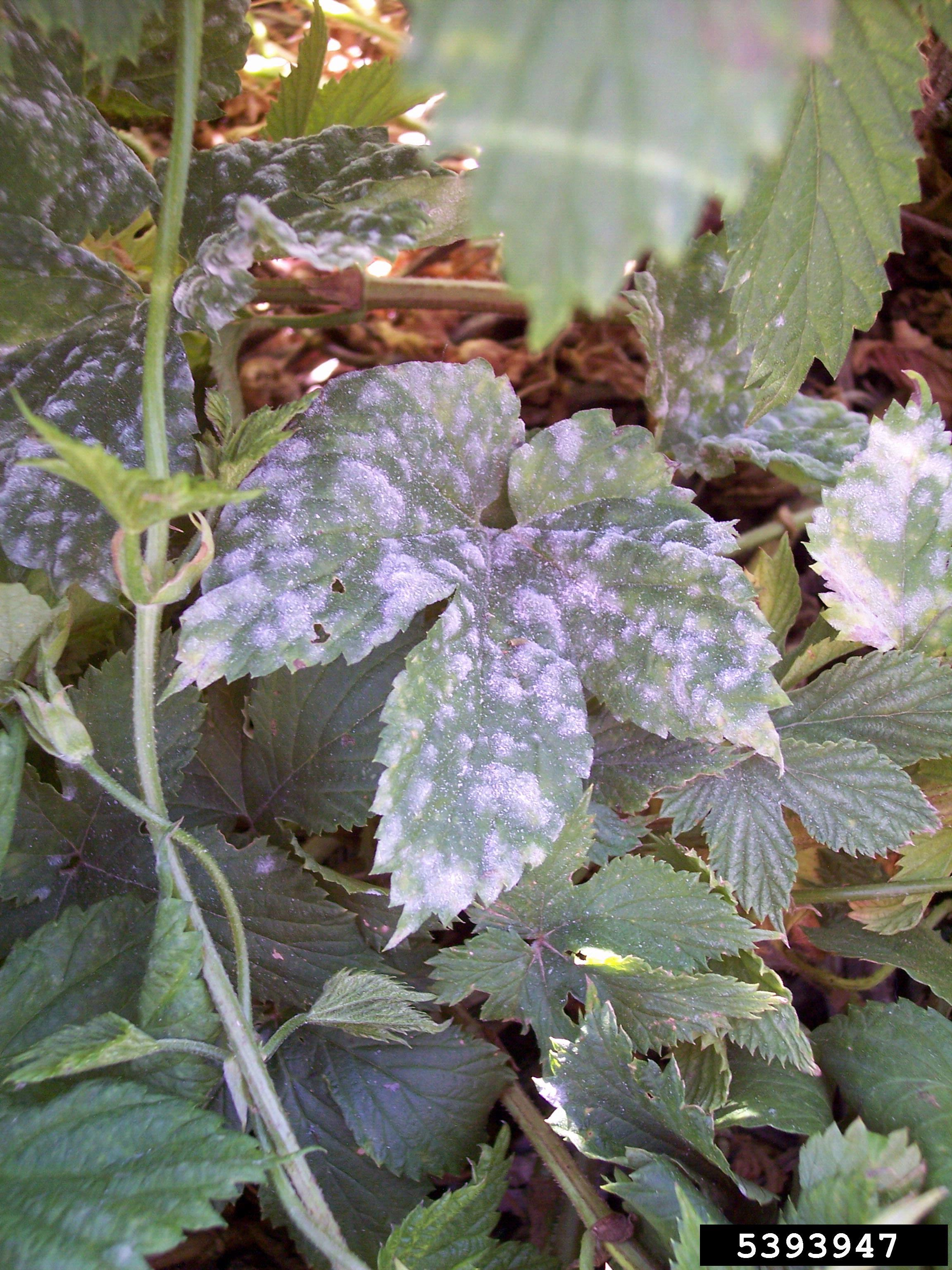
Powdery mildew on hop leaves

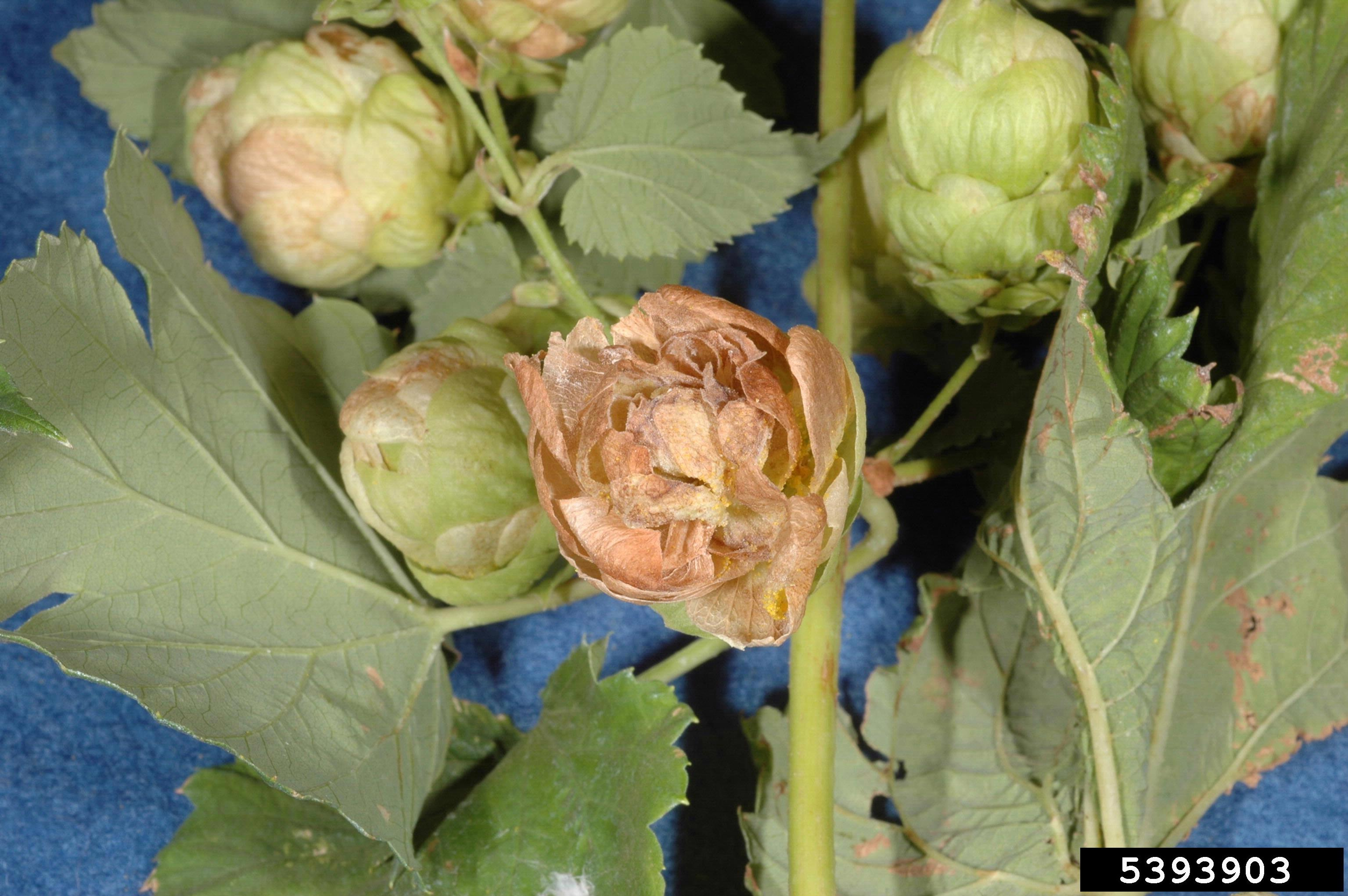
Hop cones showing powdery mildew infection

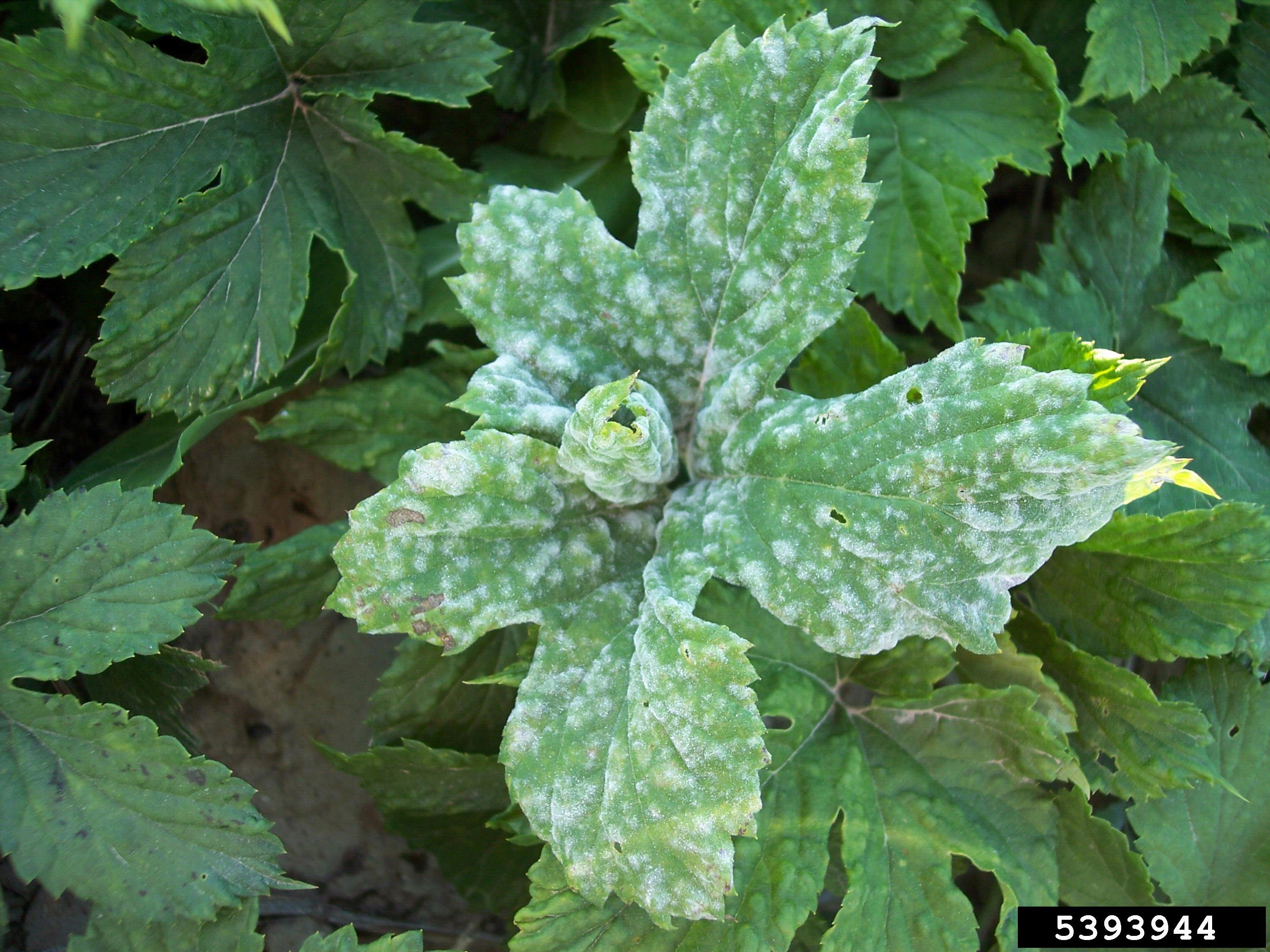
Hop leaf with signs of powdery mildew infection

== Disease cycle ==
In order for pathogenesis to occur, a viable pathogen, susceptible host, and conducive environment must simultaneously be present. Podosphaera macularis overwinters on the soil surface in debris as fungal survival structures (chasmothecia) or as mycelia in plant buds. These chasmothecia are formed closer to the end of the growing season. The characteristic morphology of chasmothecia of Hop Powdery Mildew are spherical black structures with spiked appendages. When favorable conditions are encountered during early spring, the asci (sac-like structures) within chasmothecia will rupture and ascospores will be discharged. Specifically, the favorable conditions for ascospore release include low light, excess fertility, and high soil moisture. Additionally, optimal infection is observed when the temperature is between 18 and 25 °C. Furthermore, the ascospores act as the primary inoculum and are dispersed passively by wind. Upon encountering a susceptible host plant, the ascospores will germinate and cause infection. The germ tube of P. macularis plays an important role in determining the pathogen's viability, because it can penetrate its host in approximately 15 hours. The germ tube begins branching, leading to as many as three potentially conidia-forming germ tubes. As the pathogen invades host tissue, it establishes a haustorium to facilitate the collection of nutrients from the host cells. Following infection, masses of asexual spores (conidia) will be produced during the season. It is these masses of conidia that contribute to the characteristic white, powdery appearance of infected plants. The lower leaves are the most affected, but the disease can appear on any part of the plant that is above the ground. These conidia are dispersed through wind. Thus, Podosphaera macularis is a polycyclic pathogen as conidia are produced/dispersed during the growing season and can further infect additional host plants. Particularly, the disease will be noticeable on infected plants as soon as the hop shoots start to emerge with the latent period being approximately 10 days at 12 and 15 °C compared to 5 days at 18-27 °C. These spore-covered shoots that emerge from infected buds are called “flag shoots” and will be stunted with distorted leaves. Periods of rapid plant growth are the most favorable for infection. In addition, the period in which lateral branch development takes place within the plants is also very vulnerable to the development of the disease. Due to Podosphaera macularis causing local infection, only the location of the host plant tissue where spores have landed will develop the disease.

== Optimal environment ==
Although powdery mildew can grow in a relatively hot and dry environment compared to downy mildew, conidia production peaks at temperatures of approximately 20 °C. Conidia can be produced at temperatures above 25 °C, but their infectivity is often reduced.

Under optimal conditions, this polycyclic disease can potentially grow 20 generations in a growing season. Favorable environmental conditions for Podosphaera macularis fecundity include low sun exposure, soil moisture, and excessive fertilization. The optimal temperature range for spore and mycelium growth is 18 to 25 °C. In addition, periods with small temperature differences between night and day, with a minimum of 10 °C at night and a daily high of 20 °C increase the risk of infection. High humidity and optimal temperature conditions are necessary for primary infection between the middle and end of May. The cleistothecia swell up and burst due to increased turgor pressure leading to the release of ascospores. During the secondary infection period from mid-July to August, conidia infectivity and germination is highest around 18 °C. However, leaf wetness is not essential for the formation and germination of conidia, but rather slight rain has an indirect effect related to high humidity and low sun light. Since the life cycle mainly exists externally, with only haustoria inside the host, supra-optimal temperatures and low relative humidity are unfavorable parameters for germination, infection or sporulation of powdery mildew. Temperatures exceeding 30 °C for more than three hours reduce the chance of infection by up to 50%. Intense rain and wind periods that cause spores blown throughout the hop yard also prevent powdery mildew fecundity. In addition, solar irradiation can kill released spores, but as hops grow, the sun can't penetrate the dense canopy.

== Management ==
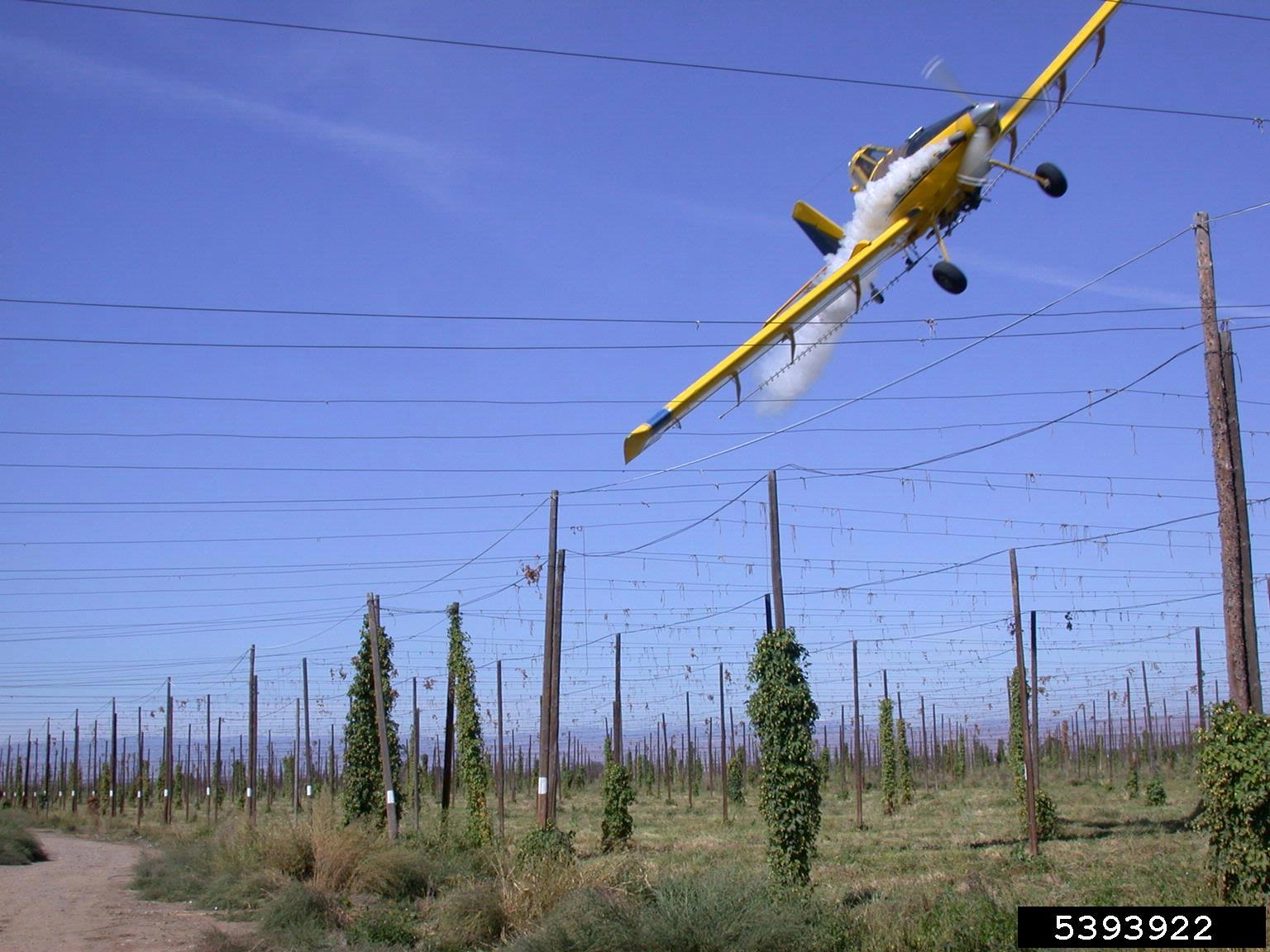
Aerial application to a hop field of fungicide against powdery mildew

The two primary ways to control Podosphaera macularis are cultural and chemical control. The most effective way to manage hop powdery mildew is through preventative measures. Cultural control of the disease include growing powdery-mildew tolerant/resistant varieties of the host plant (see below). Cultural practices that can help prevent the disease include carefully monitoring water and nutrient, reducing initial inoculum, and removing basal growth. Furthermore, pruning, crowning, and/or scratching will aid in further reduction of the disease. Pruning consists of removing shoots before training. Crowning refers to the process of removing the top 1–2 inches of the crown before budbreak. Scratching is done through disturbing the soil surface to remove the top 1–2 inches of buds. All of these methods disturb the overwintering stage of the life cycle of Podosphaera macularis. Likewise, chemical control primarily consists of spraying fungicides in hopes of preventing the disease through the use of early, continuous spraying during the growing season. Thus, prophylactic fungicide programs can be a very effective way in preventing the disease. Since the fungicides are a preventative measure, they are not very useful to use during a full-blown infection. Therefore, the use of fungicides disturbs release of spores and further infection within the disease cycle of Podosphaera macularis. As there are several fungicides that are effective against powdery mildew, it is important to apply the fungicides at specific times. If it is known that powdery mildew is present, spray programs should be started as soon as the shoots emerge. Due to powdery mildew's ability to quickly develop resistance to fungicides, it is important to rotate the fungicides that are used. However, few or no fungicide applications should be used during burr development as these burrs have increased vulnerability to damage. In this case, removing basal growth before flowering and applying a protectant fungicide with long-term residual action should be employed.

== Genetics ==
Isolate HPM-609 was sequenced in 2023 and has a genome of 102.28Mbp with 6,954 genes identified.

The host range of many P. macularis strains is restricted by the existence of resistant hop varieties, such as the “Nugget” variety of Washington state and Oregon, although in recent years, resistance within this hop variety has been overcome in the laboratory. Only certain hosts are susceptible, because there are seven resistance genes in hop varieties that can be activated in response to infection. Many of them operate by either causing the initial haustorium to lyse, or by preventing the pathogen from spreading. The spread is stopped by a hypersensitive response, which is often associated with the establishment of large callose and lignin deposits surrounding infected cells. Although susceptible plants can increase callose and lignin deposits in response to infection, the hypersensitive response is only found in resistant varieties.

== Economic impact ==
In Washington, severe infections led to a yield loss of 800 hectares (US $10 million) of crops in its first year of 1997. At the time, sulfur was the only registered pesticide used on hop that was effective against powdery mildew. In 1998, the disease was confirmed in Idaho and Oregon. As a result, Yakima Valley growers managed the disease using approaches developed in Europe, such as, labor-intensive cultural practices, mechanical or chemical removal of spring growth, and intensive fungicide programs despite the small number of fungicides available for hop at the time. Although the methods successfully limited disease development, the depressed market for hops couldn't sustain the expensive production costs ($1400/ha annually in 1998). In 2001, a contracting brewery rejected 50% of an aroma hop grown in Oregon because of cone browning after drying, resulting in an additional US $5 million in losses that year. These losses have contributed to economic depression in the hop market and have forced several growers to declare bankruptcy. While more research is necessary to understand Podosphaera macularis and control, the current management system has returned economics to hop industry. Disease levels have decreased and control costs have been reduced to $740/ha on average. Unlike New York and California, hop production in the Pacific Northwest is likely to continue.

== See also ==
- Phorodon humuli - hop aphid
- Pseudoperonospora humuli - hop downy mildew
- Verticillium nonalfalfae - hop wilt
- List of hop diseases
