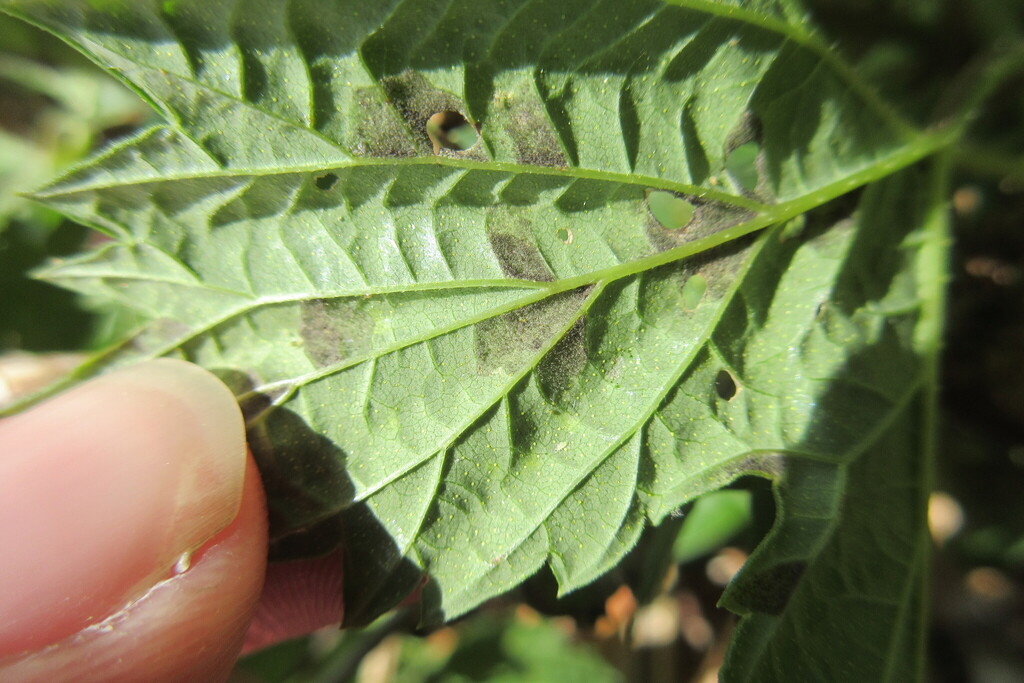

Scientific classification
- Domain: Eukaryota
- Clade: Sar
- Clade: Stramenopiles
- Phylum: Oomycota
- Class: Peronosporomycetes
- Order: Peronosporales
- Family: Peronosporaceae
- Genus: Pseudoperonospora
- Species: P. humuli

Binomial name
- Pseudoperonospora humuli (Miyabe & Takah.) G.W. Wilson, (1914)

Synonyms
- Peronoplasmopara humuli Miyabe & Takah., (1905); Peronospora humuli (Miyabe & Takah.) Skalický, (1966); Plasmopara humuli (Miyabe & Takah.) Sacc., (1912)

= Pseudoperonospora humuli =

Species of single-celled organism

Pseudoperonospora humuli is a plant pathogen that causes downy mildew on hops.

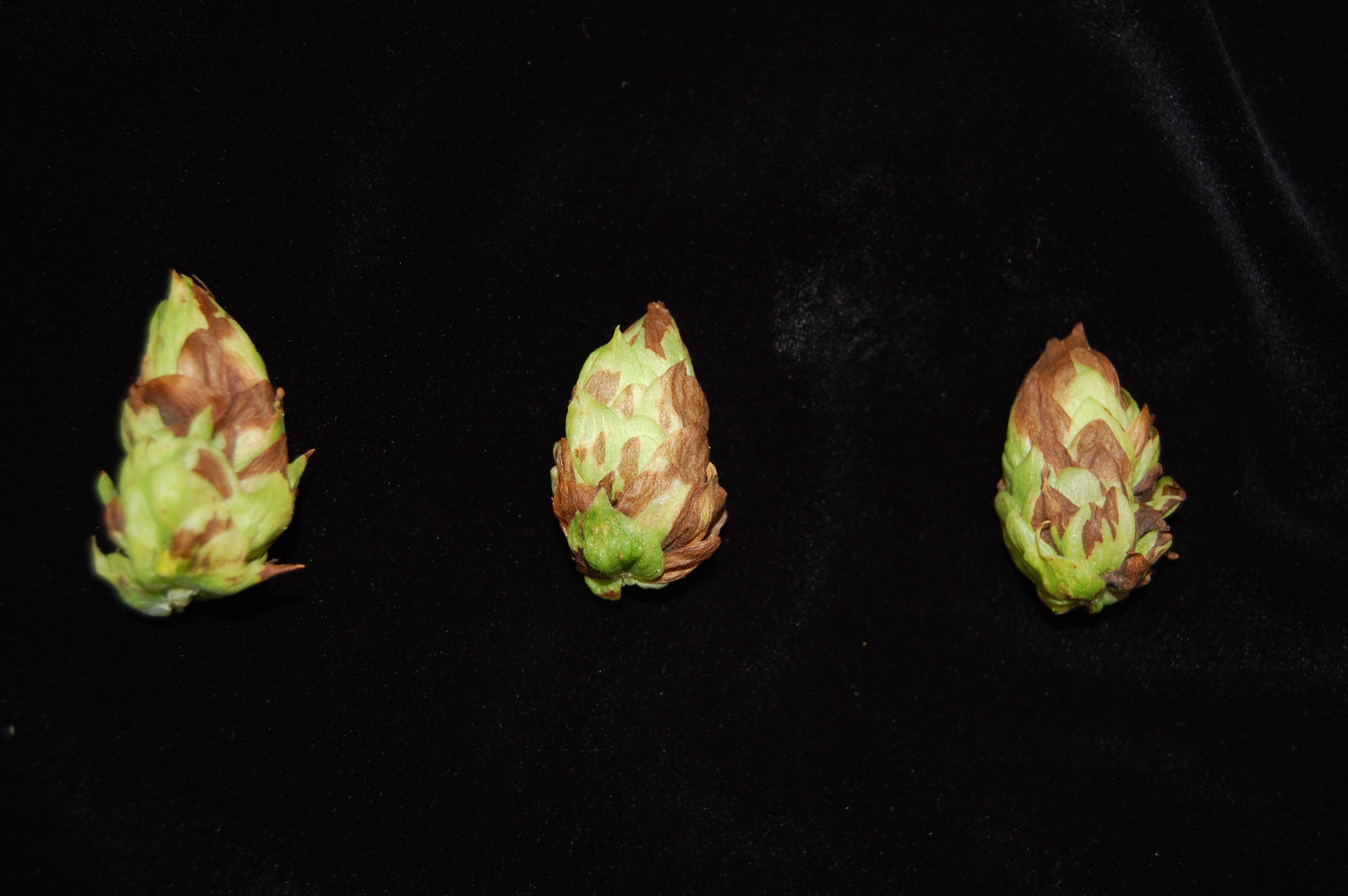
Cones of the hops plant infected with Pseudoperonospora humuli. The brown coloration is a characteristic symptom.

== Hosts and symptoms ==
Downy mildew on hops is caused by the pathogen Pseudoperonospora humuli, an oomycete protist. P. humuli is an obligate biotrophic pathogen, meaning that it can only live and grow in living host tissue. P. humuli, like most downy mildews, is highly host-specific and thus will only infect hop (Humulus lupulus) and also Japanese hop (Humulus japonicas).

The most characteristic symptom of hop downy mildew are the “basal spikes” that form on the plant. These structures result from systemically infected shoots and are “stunted and have brittle, downward-curled leaves from which masses of purple to black sporangiophores and sporangia are produced.” These spikes can exist as three distinct types:

1) “Primary spikes”, which arise from infected hop crowns

2) “Secondary spikes”, which arise from infected apical meristems

3) “Aerial spikes”, which occur on lateral branches or trained vines

Primary and secondary spikes result in stunting shoots and brittle leaves. Primary spikes also cause shortened internodes. Aerial spikes adversely affect the development of the plant, resulting in bines (the long, flexible stem the plant uses to climb) falling away from the string on which hops is allowed to climb. Infected leaves and cones show symptoms as well. Infected leaves will change color, ranging from purple-gray to black downy growth. Infected cones become hard and brown and display disrupted development.

== Disease cycle ==
Downy mildew on hops has a polycyclic disease cycle. The pathogen overwinters as mycelium in hop crowns. The pathogen infects crown buds, resulting in the emergence of infected shoots and primary basal spikes in the spring under correct conditions. This initiates the disease cycle. Infected crowns may also produce uninfected shoots. The cycle becomes polycyclic as sporangiophores with sporangia emerge on the underside of infected leaves. Mature sporangia are dispersed via wind and release zoospores to infect leaves, cones, and shoots. This secondary cycle or sporulation and infection persists throughout the season. Mycelia grow systemically throughout the plant, leading to the infection of the crown and buds in which the pathogen will overwinter.

A sexual stage also exists for P. humuli, in which an antheridium fertilizes an oogonium to produce a recombinant oospore. While oospores are classically thought to be the chief survival structure of oomycetes, their role in primary infection in downy mildew of hops is uncertain.

== Environment ==
The environmental conditions favored by P. humuli are consistent with other oomycetes and fungal-like pathogens. High levels of moisture and warmer temperatures facilitate the germination of many pathogens.

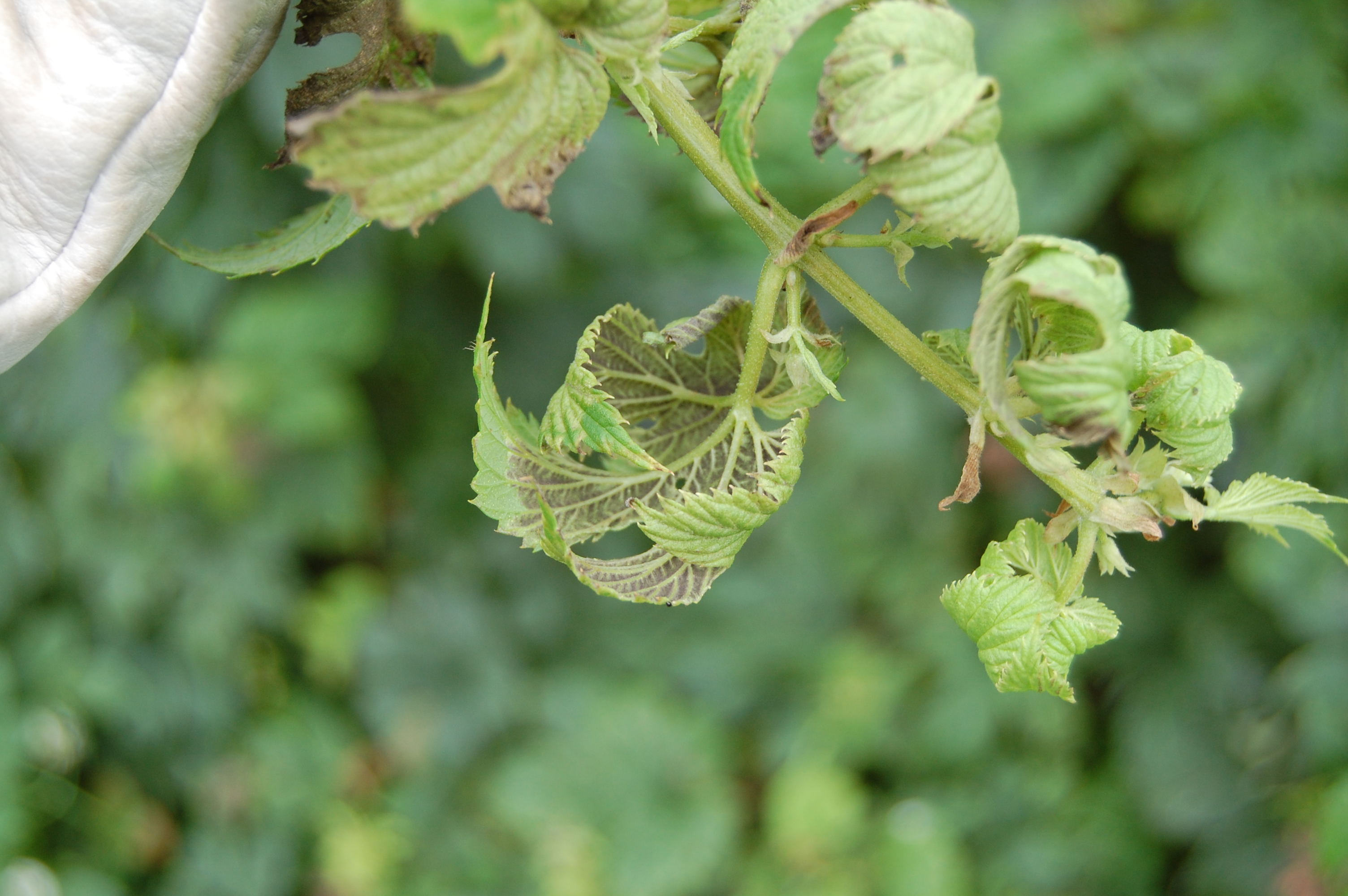
The underside of a hops leaf infected by Pseudoperonospora humuli. The dark coloration is consistent with sporulation.

The development and severity of the disease is dependent on a number of environmental factors. Studies have found that hours of relative humidity >80%, degree-hours of wetness, and mean night temperature are paramount in predicting model plants' susceptibility to infection. The pathogen favors extended periods of wetness, high humidity, and mildly warm temperatures ranging from 15.5–21 °C (59.9–69.8 °F). Leaf infection can occur at temperatures as low as 5 °C if wetness persists for 24 hours or longer, indicating the primary role of moisture level in infection.

== See also ==
- Phorodon humuli - hop aphid
- Podosphaera macularis - hop powdery mildew
- Verticillium nonalfalfae - hop wilt
- List_of_hop_diseases
