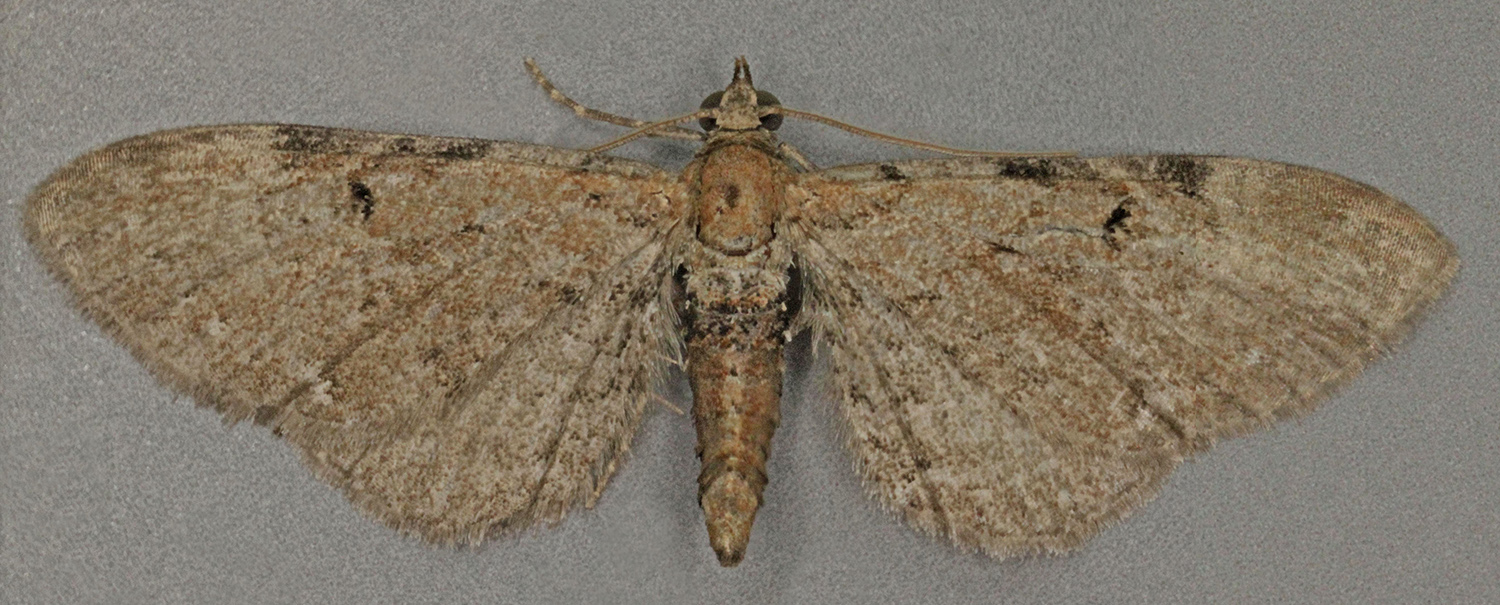
- Bleached Pug, Trawscoed, North Wales

Scientific classification
- Kingdom: Animalia
- Phylum: Arthropoda
- Clade: Pancrustacea
- Class: Insecta
- Order: Lepidoptera
- Family: Geometridae
- Genus: Eupithecia
- Species: E. expallidata

Binomial name
- Eupithecia expallidata Doubleday, 1856

= Eupithecia expallidata =

Species of moth

Eupithecia expallidata, the bleached pug, is a moth of the family Geometridae. It is found in North-West and Central Russia, South-East Scandinavia to the North Mediterranean and West Europe including the British Isles.

The wingspan is 20–24 mm. The forewings are broad and rounded. The ground colour is pale light brown. There are two black costal stains and a large black discal stain. A fine broken black line runs around the outer margin of the forewing. The hindwings are similar and have a small discal spot. See also Prout

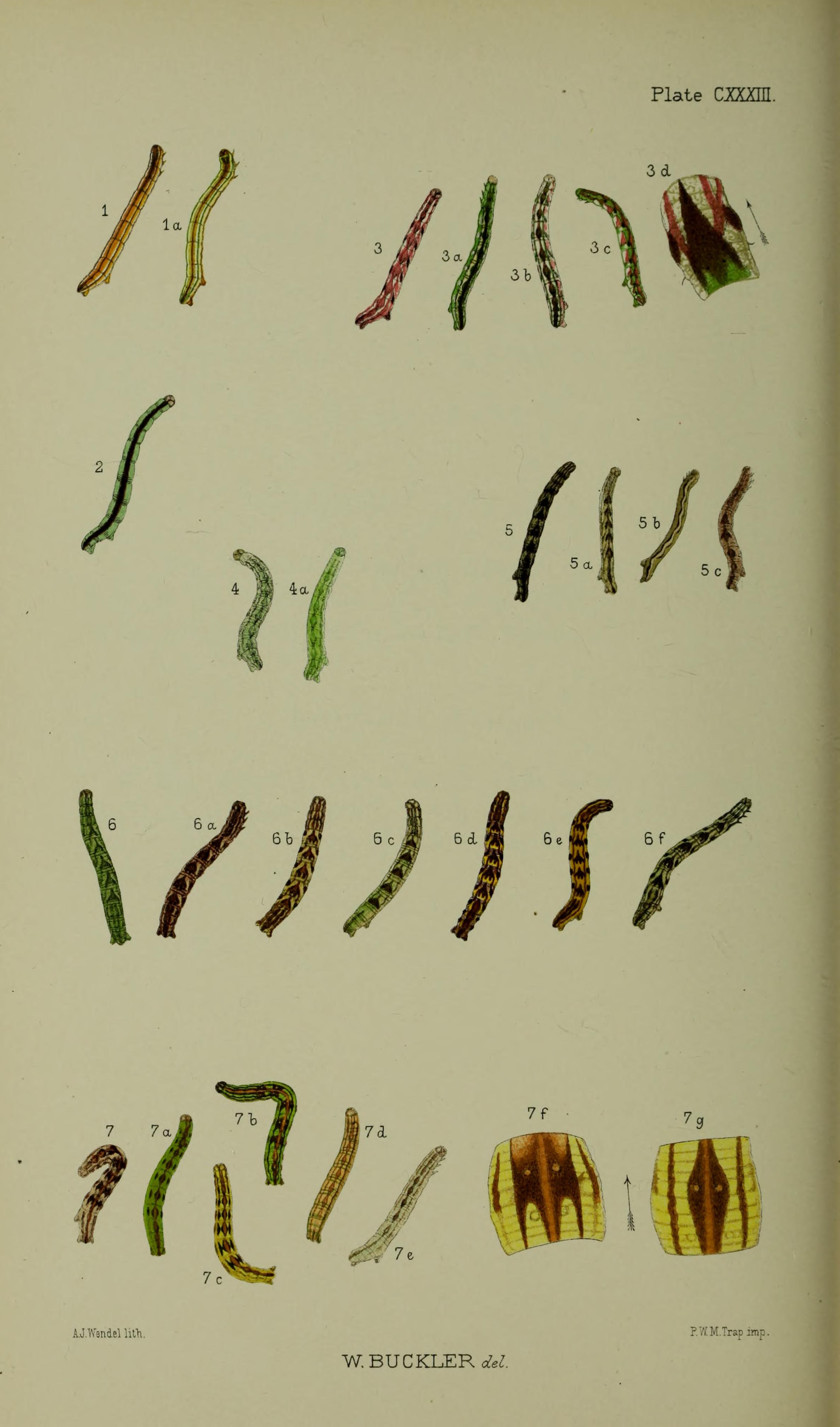
Figs 7,7a,7b,7c,7d,7e larvae in various stages 7f,7g enlarged detail of segments

The larva is matt greenish clearly and variously patterned.

The moth flies in July and August.

The larvae feed on goldenrod (Solidago virgaurea).

== Similar species ==
- Eupithecia absinthiata
