= Verticillium alfalfae =

Scientific classification
- Kingdom: Fungi
- Division: Ascomycota
- Class: Sordariomycetes
- Order: Glomerellales
- Family: Plectosphaerellaceae
- Genus: Verticillium
- Species: V. alfalfae

Binomial name
- Verticillium alfalfae Inderb. et al.

Species of fungus

Verticillium alfalfae is a fungus. It causes verticillium wilt in some plant species, particularly alfalfa. It produces yellow-pigmented hyphae and microsclerotia, while producing resting mycelium. It is most closely related to V. albo-atrum and V. nonalfalfae.
