= Eucryptorrhynchus brandti =

Scientific classification
- Kingdom: Animalia
- Phylum: Arthropoda
- Clade: Pancrustacea
- Class: Insecta
- Order: Coleoptera
- Suborder: Polyphaga
- Infraorder: Cucujiformia
- Superfamily: Curculionoidea
- Family: Curculionidae
- Genus: Eucryptorrhynchus
- Species: E. brandti

Binomial name
- Eucryptorrhynchus brandti Harold

Species of insect

Eucryptorrhynchus brandti, the Ailanthus trunk weevil or snout weevil, is an insect in the weevil family. In its native range in China, it causes significant damage to its single host, Ailanthus altissima, tree of heaven. Thus the weevil is under study as a biological control of tree of heaven in regions where the tree is non-native. In particular, the insect acts as a vector for Verticillium nonalfalfae, a soilborne fungus that causes verticillium wilt.

Eucryptorrhynchus brandti produces one generation per year, with larvae and adults overwintering. Adult weevils feed on leaves, buds, and petioles. Larvae develop under the bark of the host plant, boring and feeding, to emerge as adults through round emergence holes 4 millimeters in diameter.
