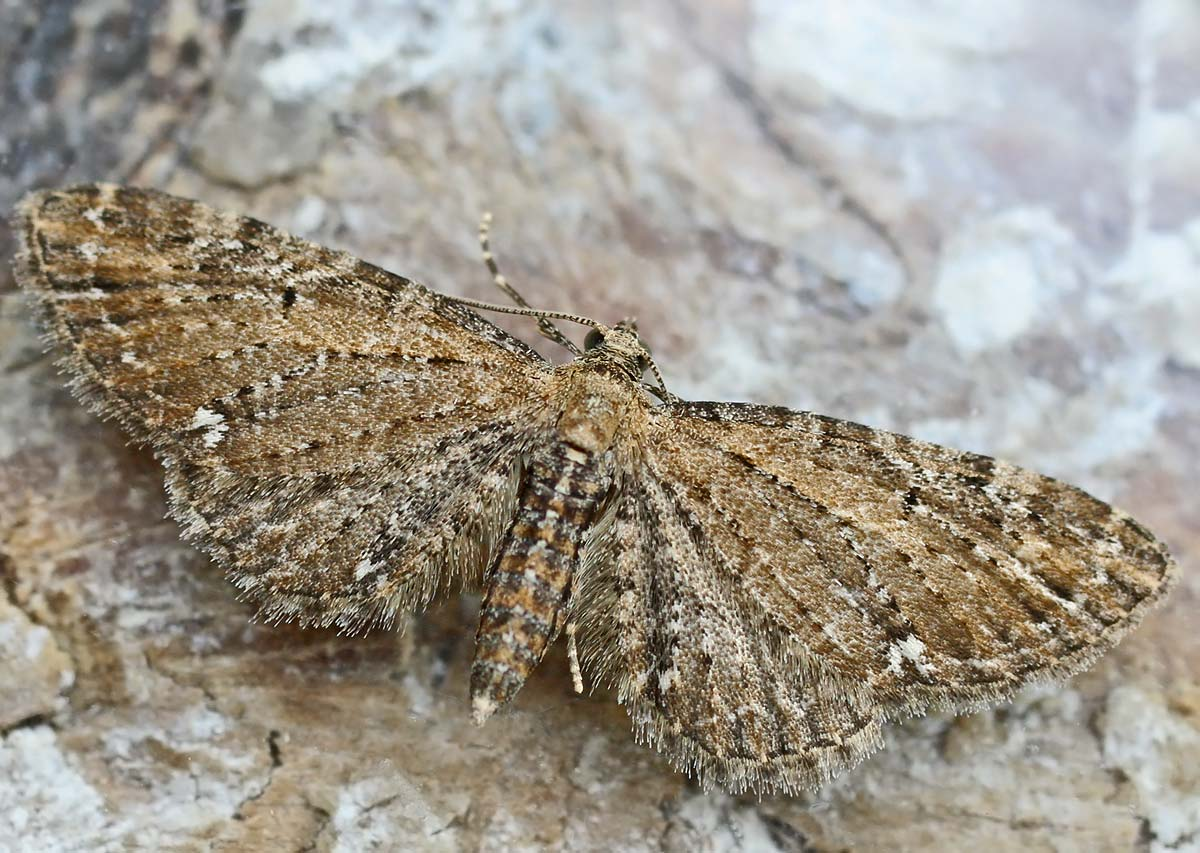

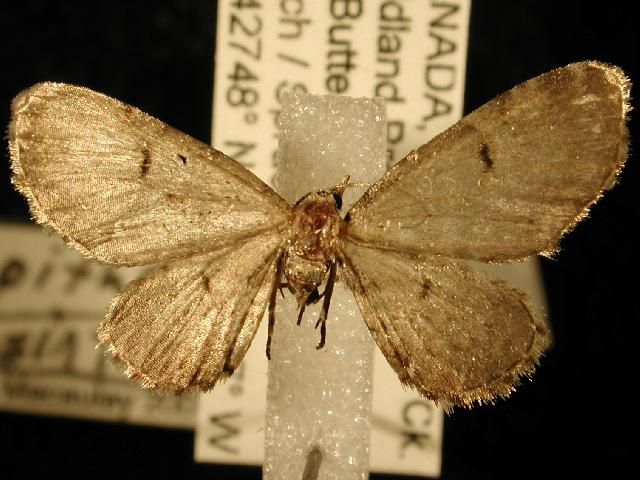

Scientific classification
- Kingdom: Animalia
- Phylum: Arthropoda
- Clade: Pancrustacea
- Class: Insecta
- Order: Lepidoptera
- Family: Geometridae
- Genus: Eupithecia
- Species: E. assimilata

Binomial name
- Eupithecia assimilata Doubleday, 1856

Synonyms
- Tephroclystia fumosa Hulst, 1896; Eupithecia fumosa; Eupithecia grisescens Dietze, 1910

= Currant pug =

Species of moth

The currant pug (Eupithecia assimilata) is a moth of the family Geometridae. The species was first described by Henry Doubleday in 1856. It is found across the Nearctic and Palearctic regions. Its occurrence extends eastwards from Ireland, across Europe to the Near East, the Urals, the Ussuri region and on to the island of Sakhalin. In the Pyrenees and the Alps it rises to altitudes of 1500 and 1800 metres respectively.

This species is rather similar to the wormwood pug, with warm brown forewings and a triangle of black spots close to the costa, but can be recognized by its broader wings and a more prominent white spot close to the tornus. Prout states - easily distinguished from absinthiata by its somewhat broader forewing, deeper colour, larger discal mark, more strongly developed subterminal spots, especially the posterior one, darker hindwing, with white dot or spot near anal angle, and especially by the spotted fringes. — grisescens Dietze from Central Russia and Central Asia, is smaller and much more mixed with grey. The wingspan is 17–22 mm.

The egg has a shiny white colour and a smooth surface. The larvae are greenish in spring, reddish or brownish in late summer and show very clear reddish-brown angular spots on the back. The colour corresponds to the leaf or fruit status of the food plant. The yellow-brown pupa has green wing sheaths and is equipped with two strong and six thin hook bristles on the cremaster.

Two broods are produced each year with adults on the wing in May and June and again in August.

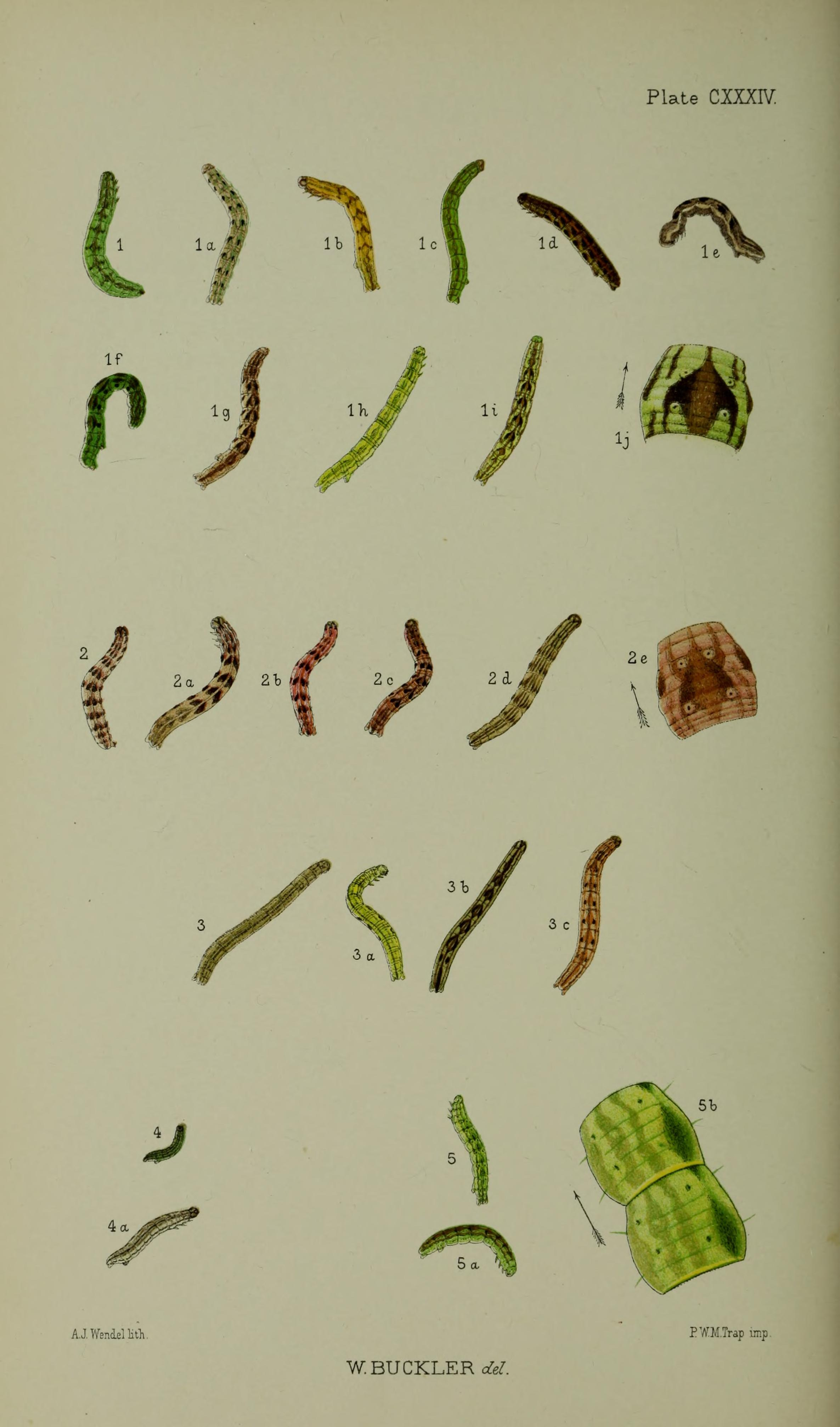
Figs 3, 3a, 3b, larvae in various stages of growth

The larva, as the name suggests, feeds on currant, but will also feed on hop. The species overwinters as a pupa.

The species prefers moist forest edges, shady hedges and riparian regions

== Similar species ==
- Eupithecia absinthiata
