= Cercospora cantuariensis =

Scientific classification
- Kingdom: Fungi
- Division: Ascomycota
- Class: Dothideomycetes
- Order: Mycosphaerellales
- Family: Mycosphaerellaceae
- Genus: Cercospora
- Species: C. cantuariensis

Binomial name
- Cercospora cantuariensis E.S. Salmon & Wormald, (1923)

Synonyms
- Centrospora cantuariensis (E.S. Salmon & Wormald) Deighton, (1971); Mycocentrospora cantuariensis (E.S. Salmon & Wormald) Deighton, (1972); Pseudocercospora cantuariensis (E.S. Salmon & Wormald) U. Braun, (1993)

Species of fungus

Cercospora cantuariensis is a fungal plant pathogen.
