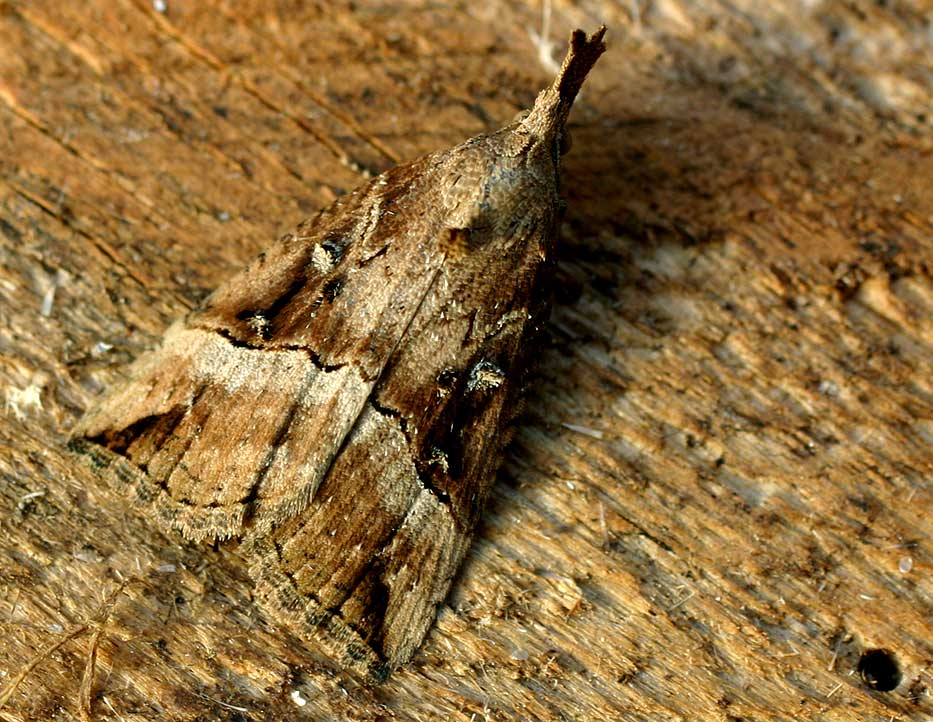

Scientific classification
- Kingdom: Animalia
- Phylum: Arthropoda
- Class: Insecta
- Order: Lepidoptera
- Superfamily: Noctuoidea
- Family: Erebidae
- Genus: Hypena
- Species: H. rostralis

Binomial name
- Hypena rostralis (Linnaeus, 1758)

= Hypena rostralis =

Species of moth

Hypena rostralis, the buttoned snout, is a moth of the family Erebidae. It is found in Europe far into Scandinavia.Then through the Palearctic into Asia Minor, the Caucasus and east to Siberia. It is widespread at forest edges, forest clearings, shore areas, in gardens, park landscapes and cultivated land and rises in the mountains up to 1600 m.

== Technical description and variation ==
H. rostralis L. Forewing grey brown, sometimes the grey, at others the brown tints predominating, speckled and striated with black and mixed with pale grey; lines black, conversely ochreous-edged; the inner strongly dentate, the outer nearly straight, slightly projecting on each fold; costa with oblique dark striae; median area, and often the basal as well, darker, especially the cell; orbicular stigma a tuft of raised scales, black or black and white, connected by a long black line with an ill-defined black reniform: subterminal line pale, dentate, generally obscure, preceded by a brown shade; an oblique black shade from apex; a row of black terminal lunules; hindwing fuscous grey; the ab. radiatalis Hbn. is suffused with fuscous, the costal streak and a broad submarginal space remaining pale dull ochreous; termen with wedge shaped grey marks, confluent with the fuscous suffusion on the two folds; the lines and stigmata feebly marked: — in ab. unicolor Tutt the forewing is uniformly grey brown, nearly all the black scaling being absent; — palpalis F. is also unicolorous, but dark grey without any brown tint; — vittatus Haw. appears to be simply a form in which the costal streak is paler than the rest of the wing; Sometimes the ground colour is ochreous, and when all the markings are well developed as well, we have the ab. ochrea-variegata Tutt, which is not uncommon, whereas the form ochrea Tutt, a third unicolorous ochrea form without markings, is very rare. Larva green with pale lines. The wingspan is 27–32 mm.

== Biology ==
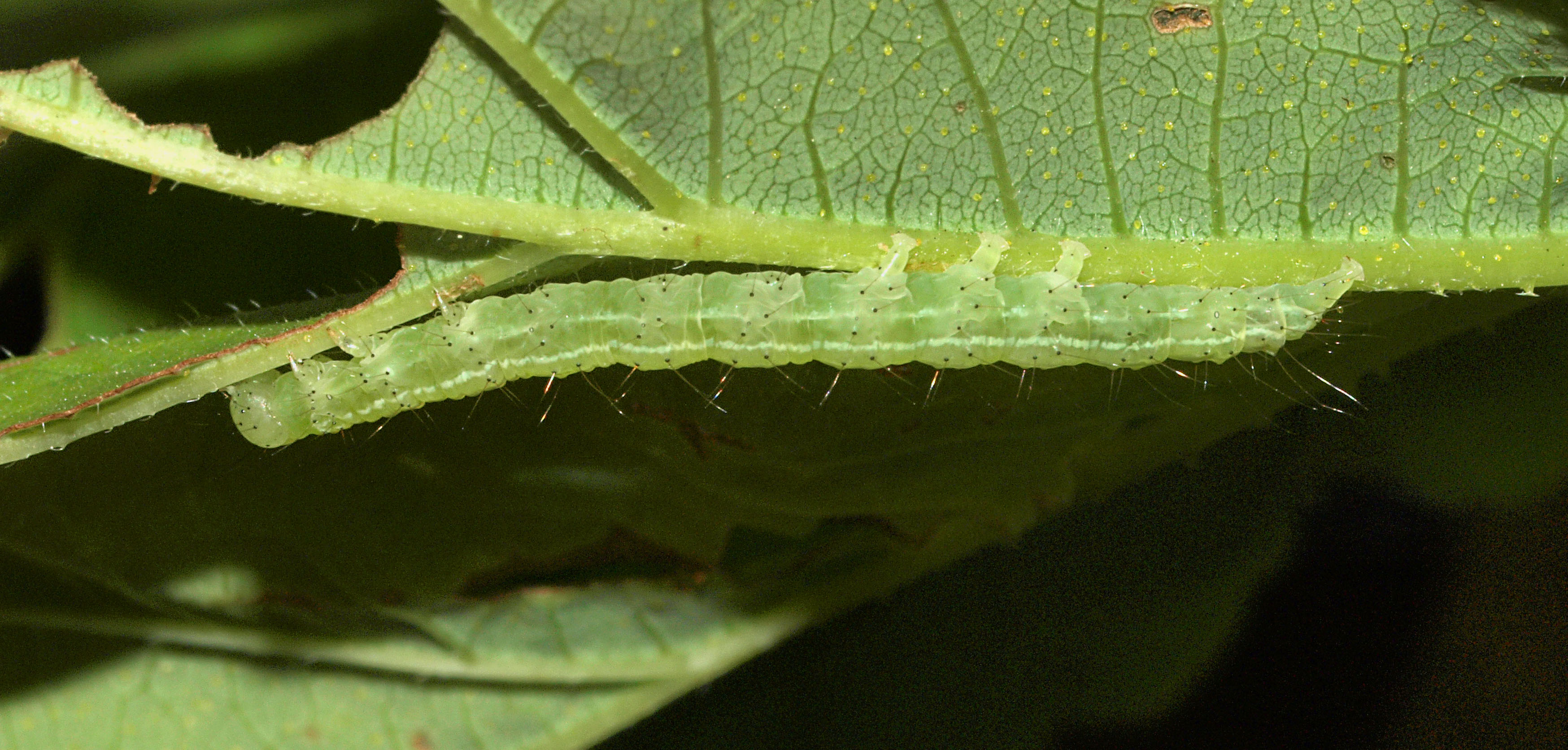
Hypena rostralis caterpillar on hop

The moth flies in two generations from August to October and again from March to June.

The larvae feed on hop.

== Notes ==
1. The flight season refers to Belgium and The Netherlands. This may vary in other parts of the range.
