= Verticillium nonalfalfae =

Scientific classification
- Kingdom: Fungi
- Division: Ascomycota
- Class: Sordariomycetes
- Order: Glomerellales
- Family: Plectosphaerellaceae
- Genus: Verticillium
- Species: V. nonalfalfae

Binomial name
- Verticillium nonalfalfae Inderb. et al.

Species of fungus

Verticillium nonalfalfae is a soilborne fungus in the order Hypocreales. It causes verticillium wilt in some plant species, including Ailanthus altissima. The fungus produces a resting mycelium characterized by brown-pigmented hyphae. It is most closely related to V. dahliae and V. alfalfae.

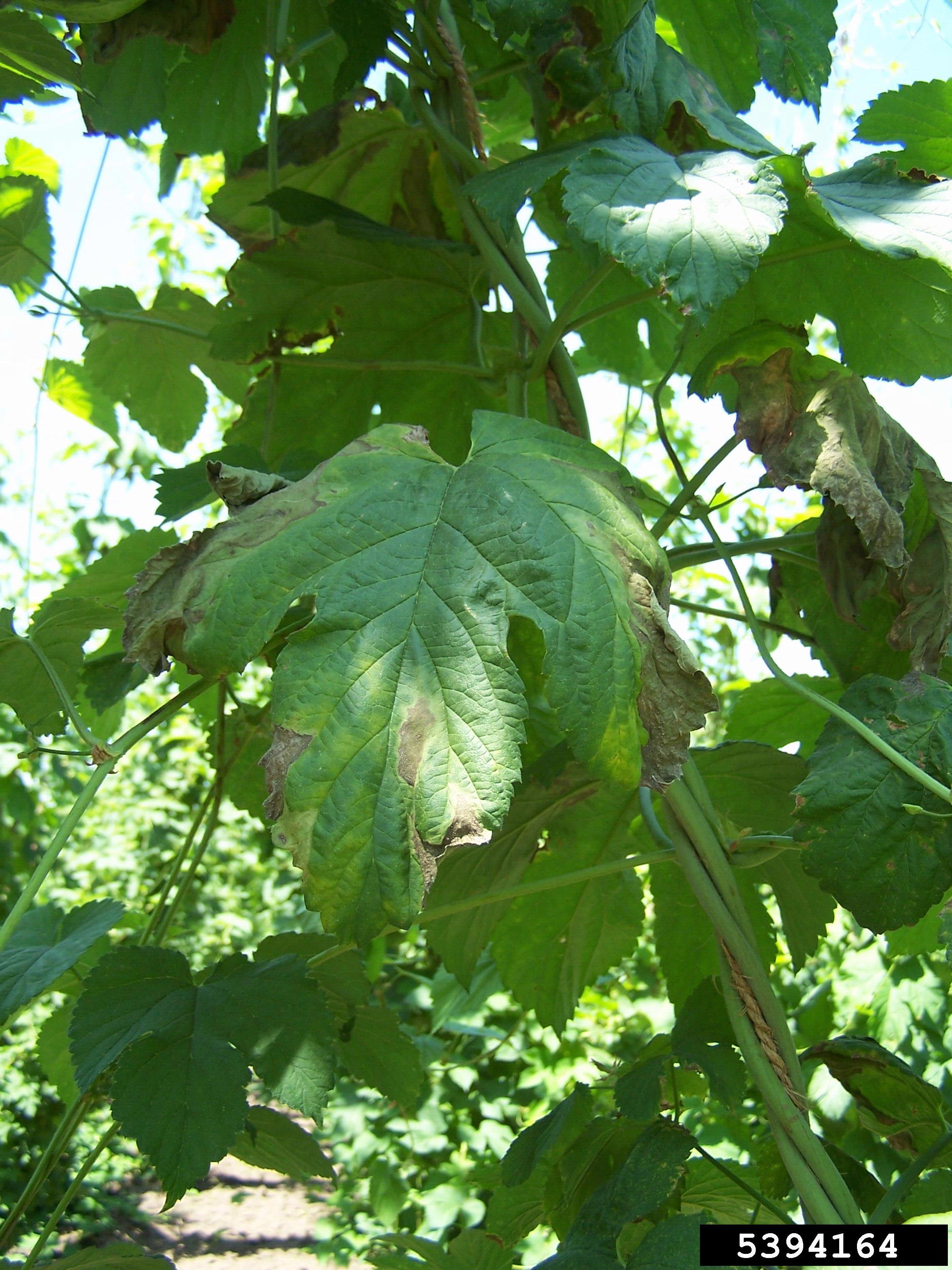
Common hop plants showing foliar symptoms of Verticillium wilt caused by Verticillium albo-atrum on a field at Oregon, USA.

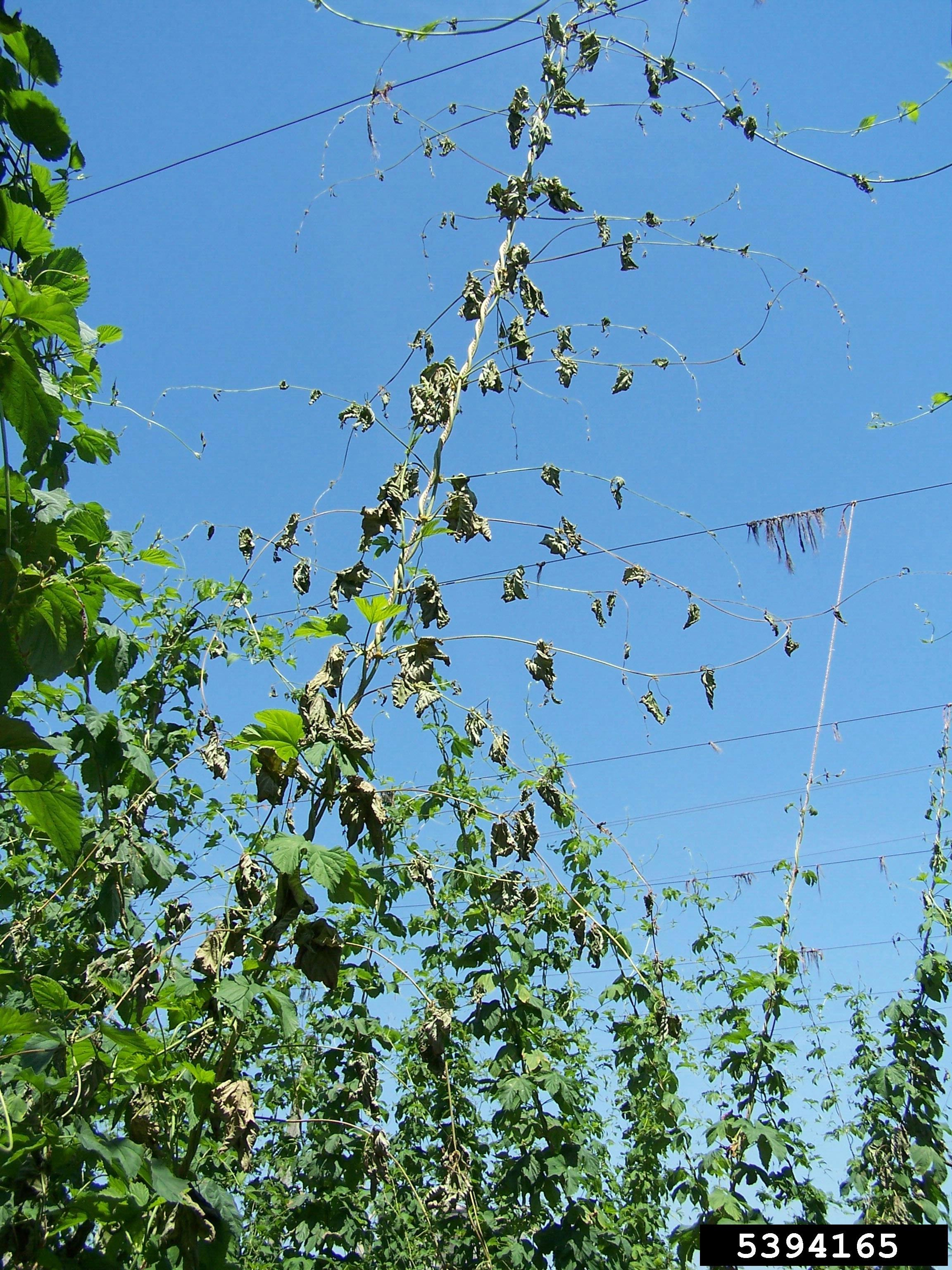
Common hop plants showing foliar symptoms of Verticillium wilt caused by Verticillium albo-atrum on a field at Oregon, USA.

== Description ==
Colonies of Verticillium nonalfalfae on Potato Dextrose Agar (PDA) reach 3.5-5.5 cm in diameter after two weeks, initially white, later darkening due to the formation of submerged resting mycelium. Aerial mycelium is abundant, cottony to powdery, composed of smooth-walled hyphae 1.5-3 μm wide. Conidiophores are erect or slanted, simple or branched, hyaline, 30-710 μm long, and 4.5-6 μm wide, tapering to 2-3 μm at the apex. Conidiogenous cells (phialides) are arranged in whorls of 1–7, spaced 50-160 μm apart, producing hyaline, smooth-walled conidia that are cylindrical to oval or allantoid, measuring 4–10.5 μm long by 2.5-3.5 μm wide. Resting mycelium is present, consisting of brown-pigmented, thick-walled hyphae, up to 9 μm wide, often aggregated and sometimes torulose.

It is not possible to differentiate V. nonalfalfae and V. alfalfae from V. albo-atrum consistently using only morphological features. Molecular diagnostics using PCR to screen for the presence of mating type idiomorphs MAT1-1 and MAT1-2 show that V. nonalfalfae has the MAT1-2 idiomorph whereas V. alfalfae has the MAT1-1 idiomorph. Verticillium albo-atrum may be found in co-infections with V. nonalfalfae on some hosts. The hyphae penetrate the root epidermal cells of hosts and enter the xylem.

== Host and symptoms ==
Verticillium nonalfalfae has a wide host range including hops, kiwifruit, spinach, solanaceous plants like eggplants and potatoes, and tree of heaven (A. altissima). Systemic infections appear on most hosts showing vascular wilts caused by xylem blockage. Additional symptoms including vascular discoloration and defoliation show almost exclusively on A. altissima. V. nonalfalfae tends not to infect non-target plants. In contrast with V. alfafae, it does not infect alfalfa.

=== Impact on hops ===
One important host of V. nonalfalfae is hops, with infections found both in the United States and most places around the world. The symptoms of hosts infected by V. nonalfalfae on hops are categorized into two pathotypes: mild and lethal. Mild pathotypes primarily cause symptoms of curling and leaf tissue death. Hops infected by V. nonalfalfae with the mild pathotype generally can survive the infection. For the lethal pathotype of V. nonalfalfae on hops, hosts suffer from rapid weakening that ultimately leads to death. The lethal form was discovered in hops in the 1940s in the United Kingdom and elsewhere in Europe later. Two pathotypes share similar peroxidase, which are thought to contribute to their pathogenicity.

== Disease cycle ==
The disease cycle of Verticillium nonalfalfae is similar to that of other members of the genus. V. nonalfalfae overwinters by forming a resting mycelium in the soil. However, unlike V. dahliae, for example, it does not produce microsclerotia.

Verticillium nonalfalfae infects in the spring via conidia in the soil; conidia are borne on conidiophores. It has been found that intraspecific grafting enhances V. nonalfalfae's dispersal of conidia, that is, conidia from diseased roots can be transported to healthy root tissues. Conidia can be transmitted through mechanical dispersal, whereby the conidia become attached to cutting tools. In the case of hops, the fungus can spread during soil cultivation, via plantings from infested yards, and through soil moved by equipment and workers. Long-distance transportation of conidia involves insects such as ambrosia beetles, which are thought to be critical in creating regional outbreaks of wilting in Ailanthus.

== Biological control of tree of heaven ==
Another important host of V. nonalfalfae is Ailanthus altissima, also known as tree of heaven. This species of Ailanthus was introduced in the northeastern United States from the 1790s, and is now a forest management problem in 40 of the 48 contiguous states. Spreading widely and quickly, it is considered to be an Invasive species. V. nonalfalfae is being studied as a biological control of A. altissima. Symptoms of verticillium wilt on tree of heaven appear quickly after inoculation, according to studies. A vector of the wilt is the weevil Eucryptorrhynchus brandti.

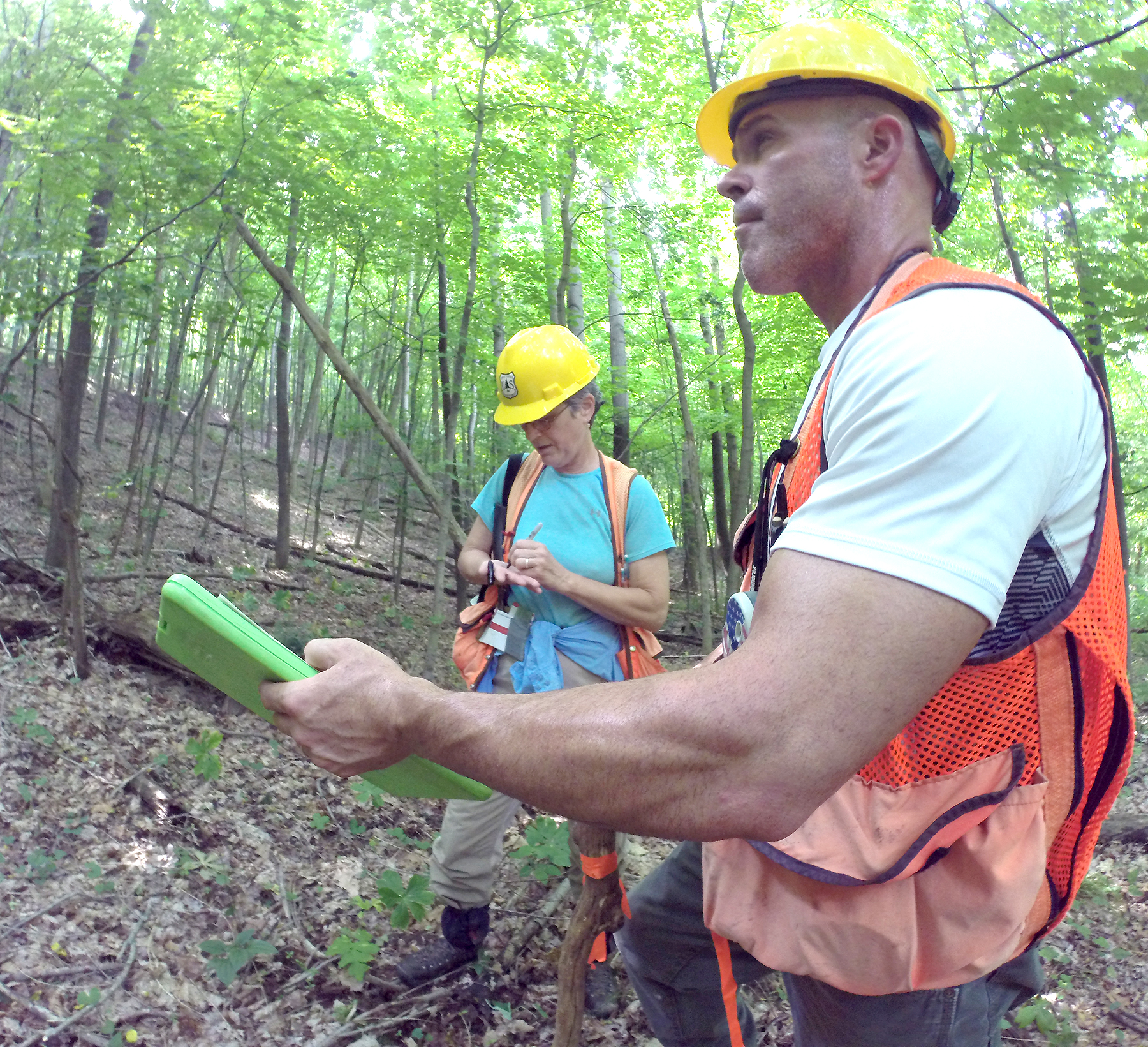
Joanne Rebbeck, a Research Scientist and Timothy Fox, a Biological Research Technician, both from the USDA Forest Service Northern Research Station, inoculate Ailanthus trees with Verticillium nonalfalfae to evaluate its effectiveness as a biological control. (Photo courtesy of USDA Forest Service, Wayne National Forest)
