= Jacea =

Jacea may refer to two different genera of plants:

- Jacea Opiz, a taxonomic synonym for Viola (plant), the violets
- Jacea Mill., a taxonomic synonym for Centaurea in the family Asteraceae
