= Coleophora varnella =

Scientific classification
- Kingdom: Animalia
- Phylum: Arthropoda
- Clade: Pancrustacea
- Class: Insecta
- Order: Lepidoptera
- Family: Coleophoridae
- Genus: Coleophora
- Species: C. varnella

Binomial name
- Coleophora varnella Baldizzone & Tabell, 2006

Species of moth

Coleophora varnella is a moth of the family Coleophoridae. It is found in eastern Bulgaria.

The wingspan is 17–18 mm. Adults have been recorded in June.

The larvae possibly feed on Centaurea species.

== Etymology ==
The specific name refers to the town of Varna, situated close to the type locality.
