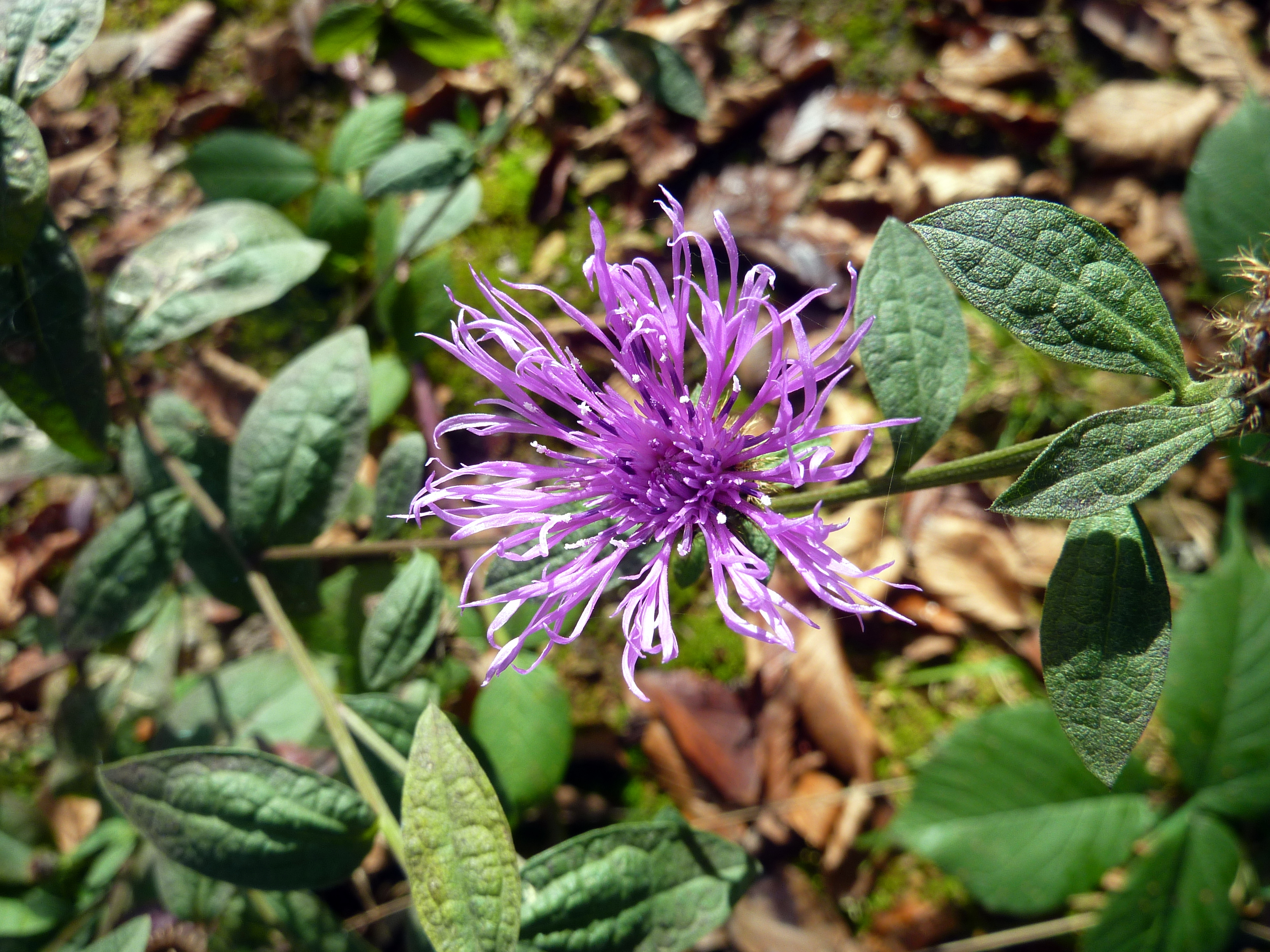

Scientific classification
- Kingdom: Plantae
- Clade: Tracheophytes
- Clade: Angiosperms
- Clade: Eudicots
- Clade: Asterids
- Order: Asterales
- Family: Asteraceae
- Genus: Centaurea
- Species: C. salicifolia

Binomial name
- Centaurea salicifolia M.Bieb. 1803

= Centaurea salicifolia =

Species of flowering plant

Centaurea salicifolia is a species of Centaurea found in the Eastern Mediterranean and the Iberian Peninsula.
