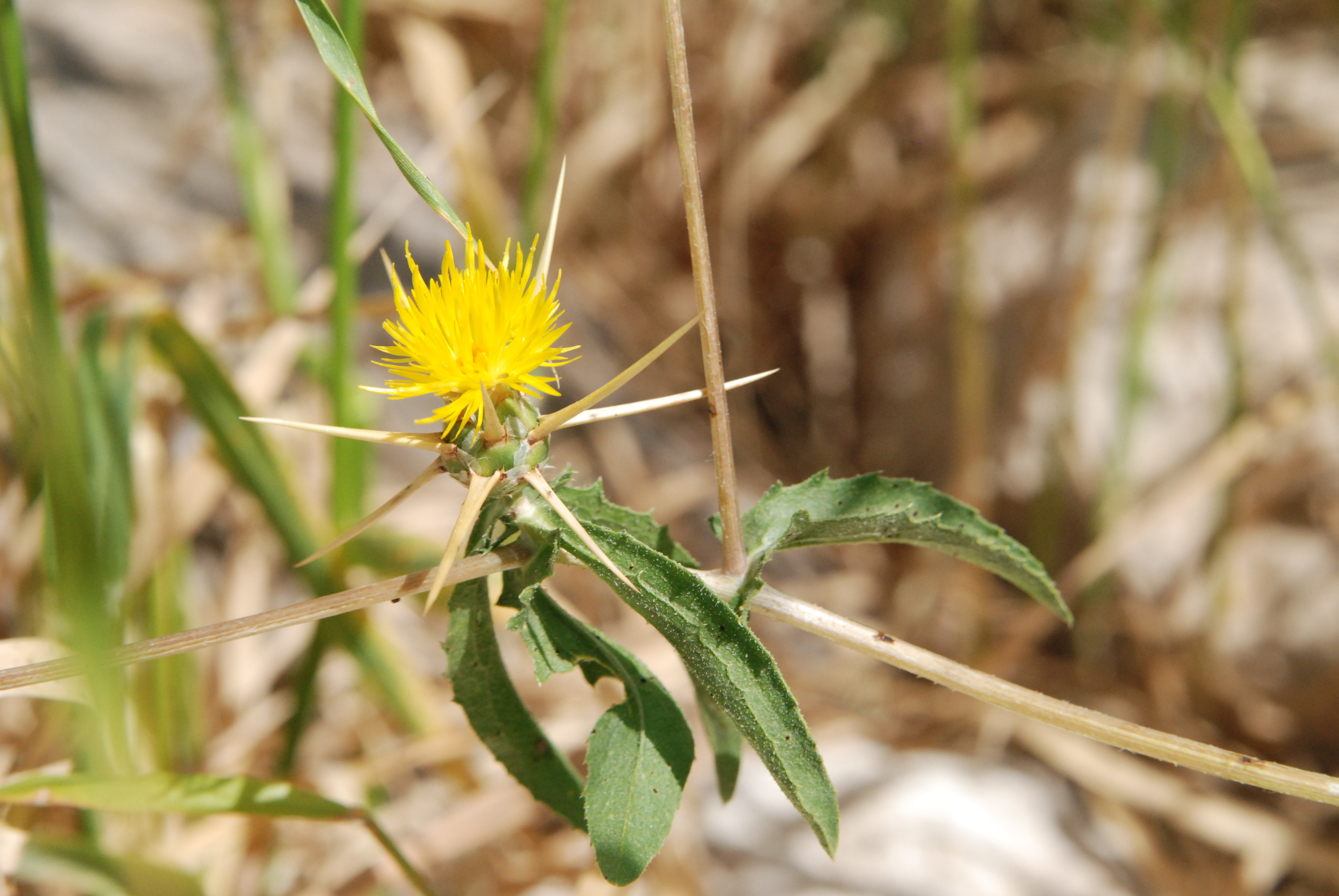

Scientific classification
- Kingdom: Plantae
- Clade: Embryophytes
- Clade: Tracheophytes
- Clade: Angiosperms
- Clade: Eudicots
- Clade: Asterids
- Order: Asterales
- Family: Asteraceae
- Genus: Centaurea
- Species: C. hyalolepis

Binomial name
- Centaurea hyalolepis Boiss.

Synonyms
- Calcitrapa hyalolepis (Boiss.) Holub

= Centaurea hyalolepis =

Species of plant

Centaurea hyalolepis is a species of plant in the family Asteraceae. It is native to Greece, Western Asia and parts of the Arabian Peninsula.

== Sources ==
This article incorporates text from a free content work. Licensed under CC0 (license statement/permission). Text taken from Centaurea hyalolepis. Encyclopedia of Life.
