= Centaurea demirizii =

Conservation status
- Critically Imperiled (NatureServe)

Scientific classification
- Kingdom: Plantae
- Clade: Tracheophytes
- Clade: Angiosperms
- Clade: Eudicots
- Clade: Asterids
- Order: Asterales
- Family: Asteraceae
- Genus: Centaurea
- Species: C. demirizii

Binomial name
- Centaurea demirizii Wagenitz

Species of plant

Centaurea demirizii, or Demiriz's centaury, is a herbaceous plant, a member of the family Asteraceae.

== Distribution ==
It is an endemic species to Turkey.

== Taxonomy ==
It was named by Gerhard Wagenitz, in 1960.
