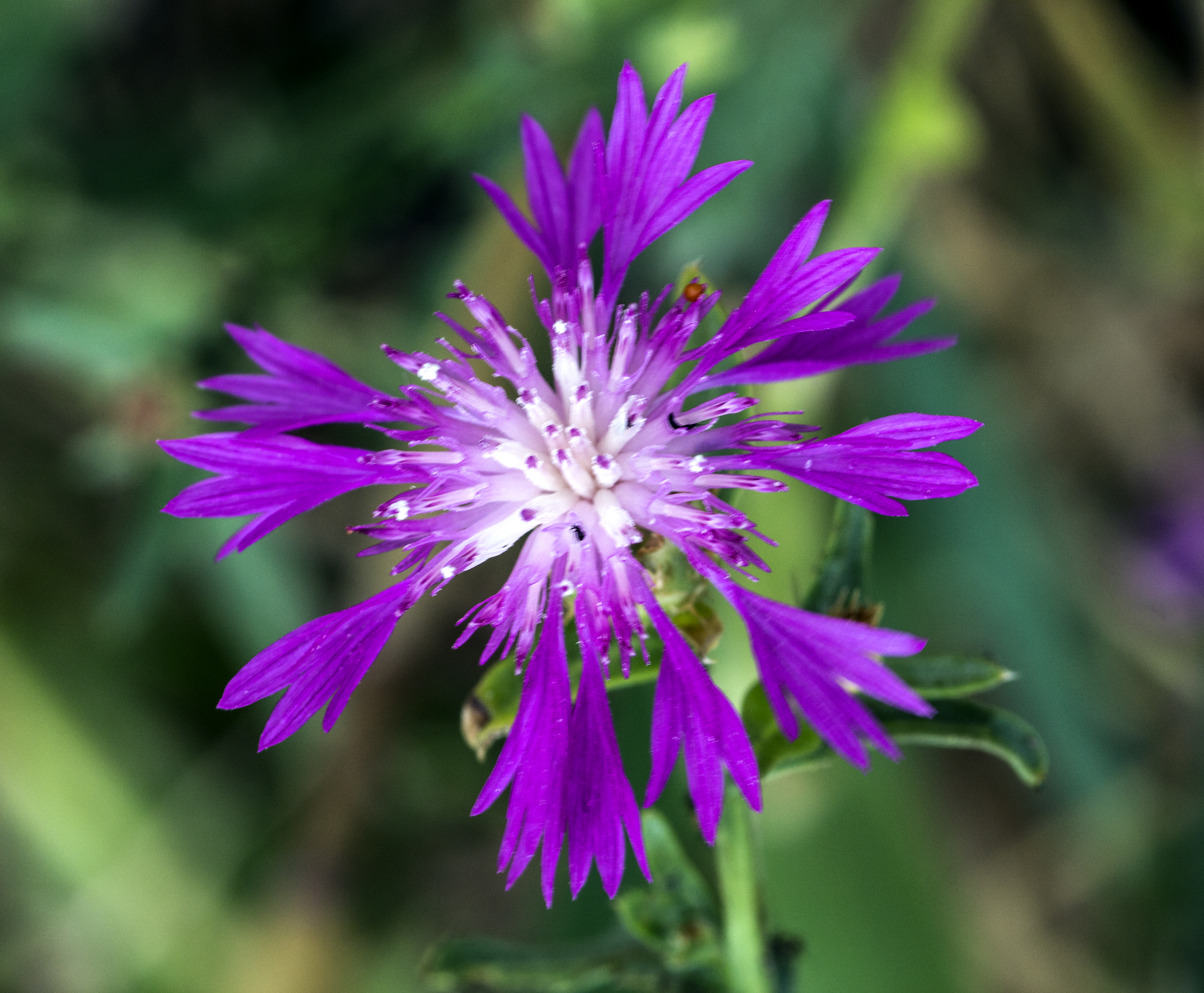

Scientific classification
- Kingdom: Plantae
- Clade: Tracheophytes
- Clade: Angiosperms
- Clade: Eudicots
- Clade: Asterids
- Order: Asterales
- Family: Asteraceae
- Genus: Centaurea
- Species: C. diluta

Binomial name
- Centaurea diluta Aiton

= Centaurea diluta =

Species of flowering plant

Centaurea diluta, the lesser star-thistle, North African knapweed, or pale-flowered centaury, is a species of Centaurea. It is native to southwestern Europe and northern Africa.
