= Centaurea idaea =

Conservation status
- Least Concern (IUCN 3.1)

Scientific classification
- Kingdom: Plantae
- Clade: Tracheophytes
- Clade: Angiosperms
- Clade: Eudicots
- Clade: Asterids
- Order: Asterales
- Family: Asteraceae
- Genus: Centaurea
- Species: C. idaea

Binomial name
- Centaurea idaea Boiss. & Heldr.

Synonyms
- Calcitrapa idaea (Boiss. & Heldr.) Soják

Species of flowering plant

Centaurea idaea is a species of flowering plant in the family Asteraceae. It is endemic to Crete.
