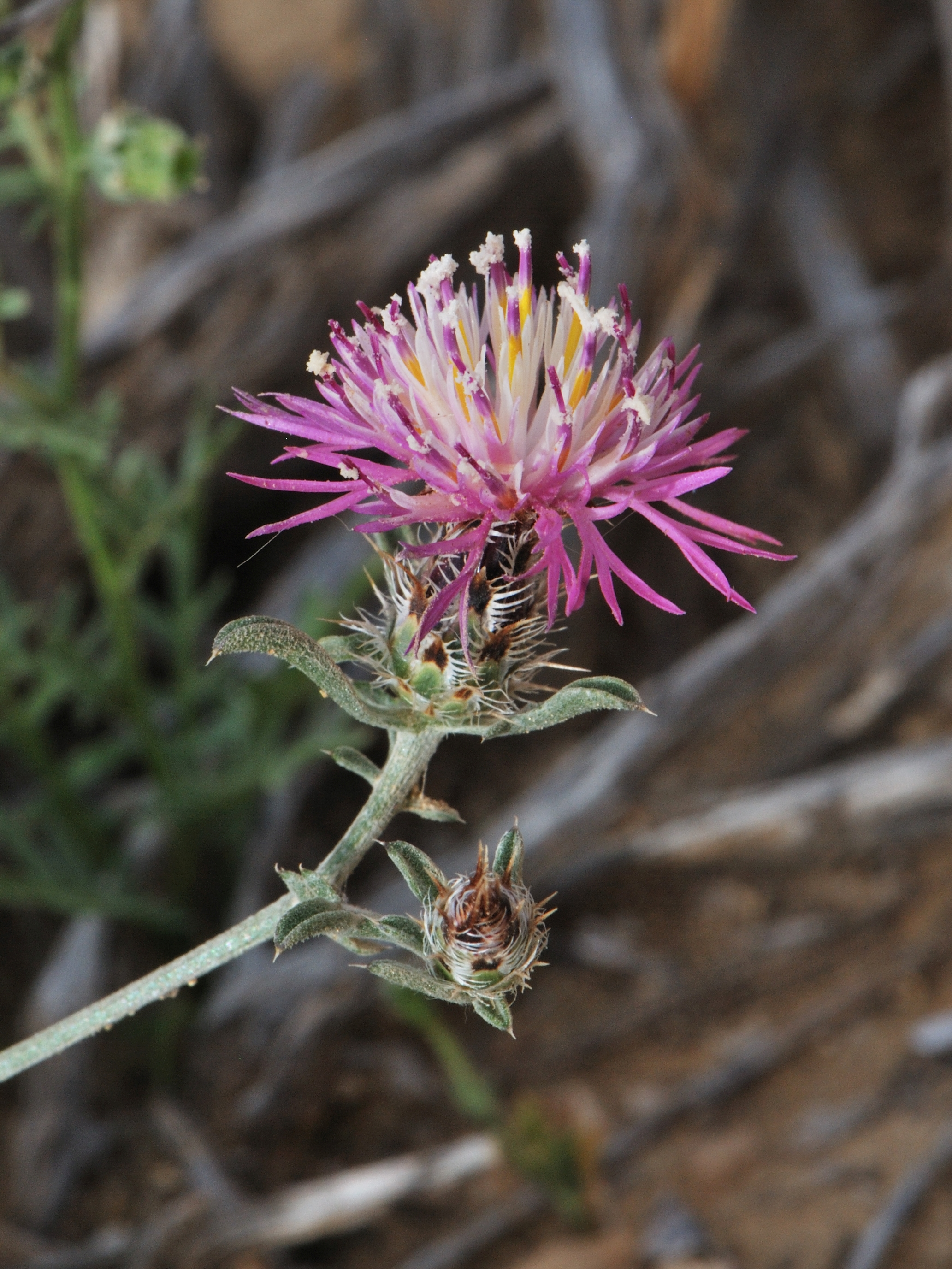

Scientific classification
- Kingdom: Plantae
- Clade: Embryophytes
- Clade: Tracheophytes
- Clade: Spermatophytes
- Clade: Angiosperms
- Clade: Eudicots
- Clade: Asterids
- Order: Asterales
- Family: Asteraceae
- Genus: Centaurea
- Species: C. ammocyanus

Binomial name
- Centaurea ammocyanus Boiss.

Synonyms
- Ammocyanus arabicus Dostál

= Centaurea ammocyanus =

Species of flowering plant

Centaurea ammocyanus is a species of flowering plant in the family Asteraceae. It is native to Western Asia.
