= Centaurea hermannii =

Conservation status
- Endangered (IUCN 3.1)

Scientific classification
- Kingdom: Plantae
- Clade: Tracheophytes
- Clade: Angiosperms
- Clade: Eudicots
- Clade: Asterids
- Order: Asterales
- Family: Asteraceae
- Genus: Centaurea
- Species: C. hermannii

Binomial name
- Centaurea hermannii F. Hermann

Species of flowering plant

Centaurea hermannii, is a perennial herbaceous plant belonging to the genus Centaurea of the family Asteraceae. It is an endemic plant of Turkey and found only in Çatalca Peninsula, and threatened by habitat loss.
