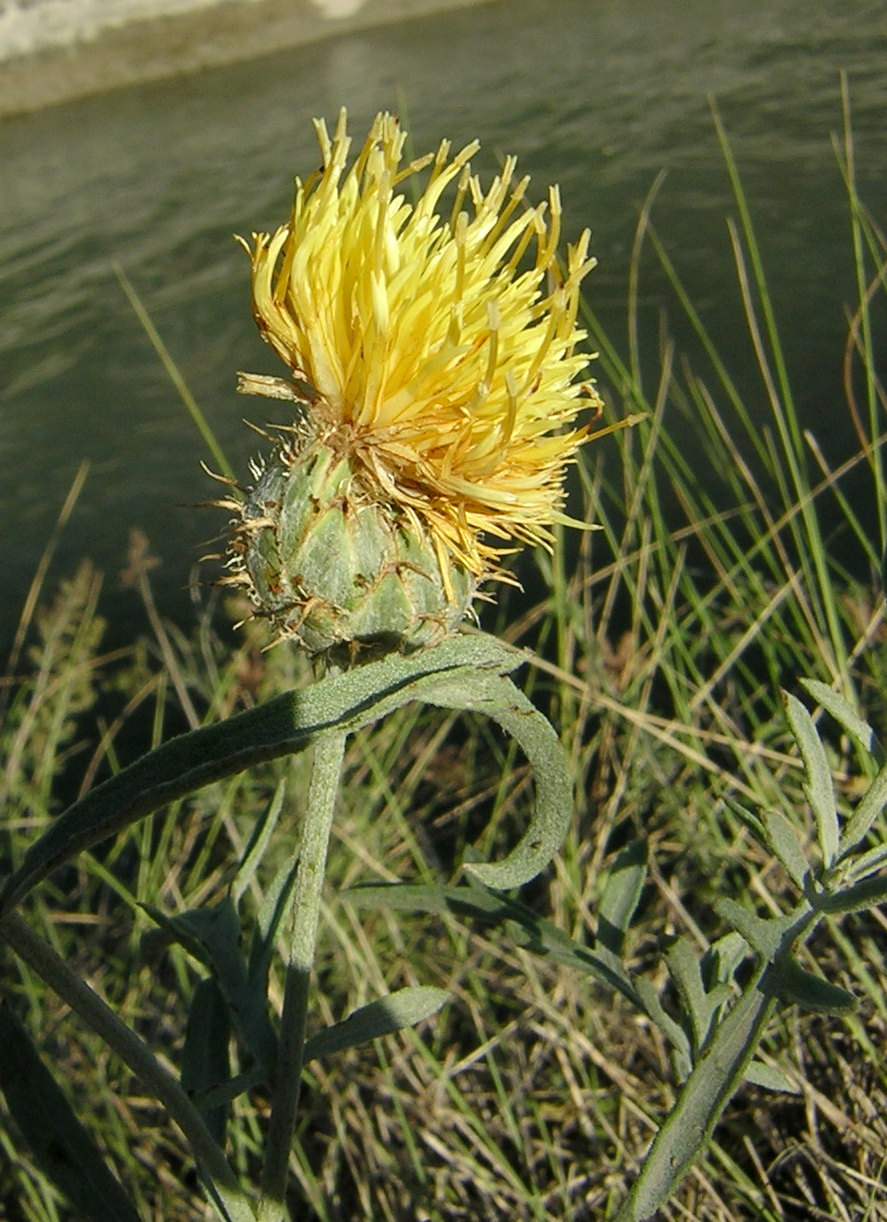

Scientific classification
- Kingdom: Plantae
- Clade: Tracheophytes
- Clade: Angiosperms
- Clade: Eudicots
- Clade: Asterids
- Order: Asterales
- Family: Asteraceae
- Genus: Centaurea
- Species: C. collina

Binomial name
- Centaurea collina L. 1753

= Centaurea collina =

Species of flowering plant

Centaurea collina is a species of Centaurea found in Portugal.
