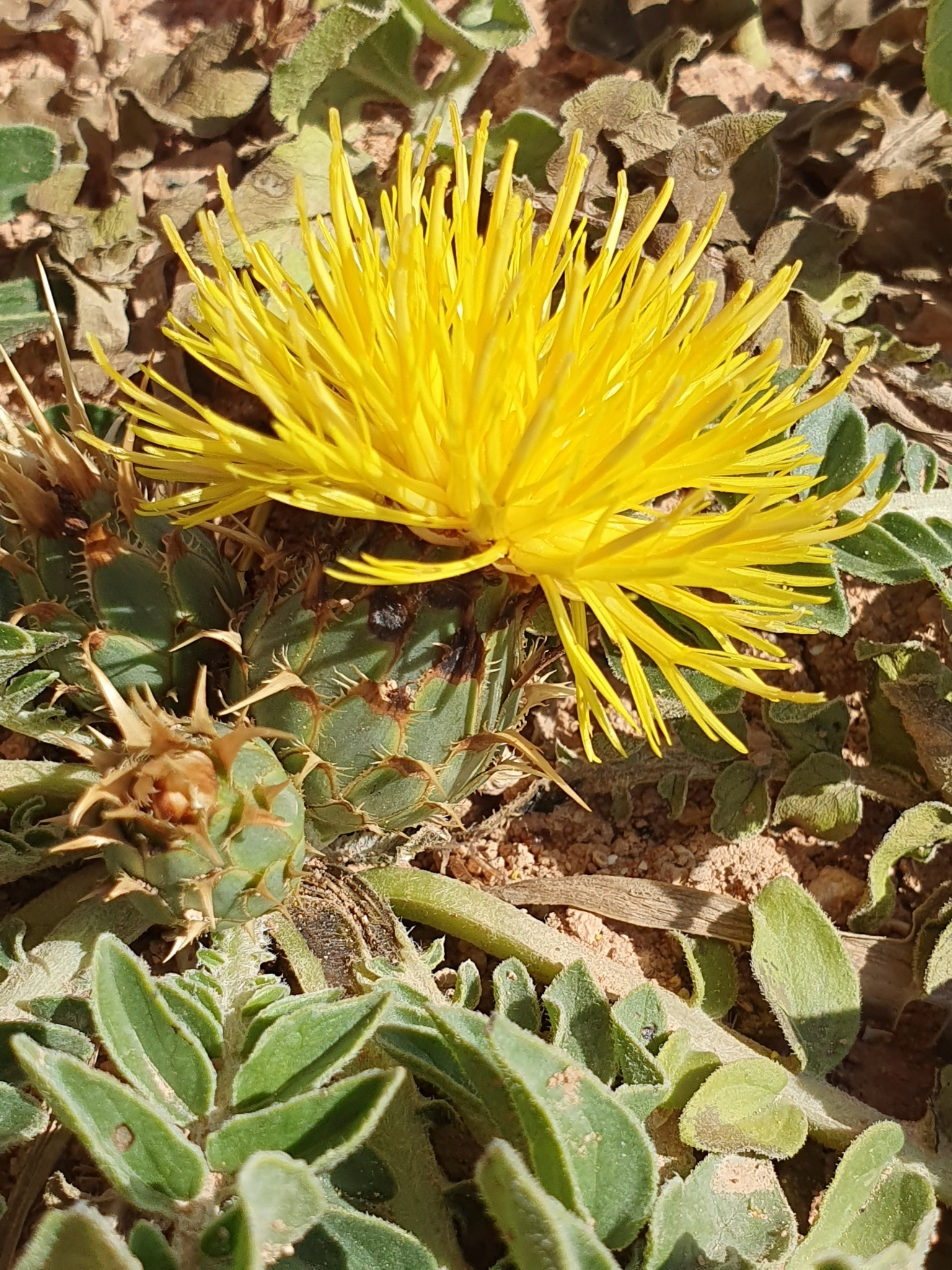
- In Algeria

Scientific classification
- Kingdom: Plantae
- Clade: Embryophytes
- Clade: Tracheophytes
- Clade: Angiosperms
- Clade: Eudicots
- Clade: Asterids
- Order: Asterales
- Family: Asteraceae
- Genus: Centaurea
- Species: C. acaulis

Binomial name
- Centaurea acaulis L.

Synonyms
- List: Colymbada acaulis (L.) Holub; Menomphalus acaulis (L.) Pomel; Serratula acaulis (L.) DC.; Amblyopogon balansae Boiss.; Centaurea balansae Boiss. & Reut.; Centaurea chamaerhaponticum Ball; Centaurea chouletteana Pomel; Centaurea nidulans Pomel; Centaurea pharaonis Pomel; Cestrinus carthamoides Cass.; Colymbada balansae (Boiss. & Reut.) Holub; Cynara humilis Juss.; Menomphalus chouletteana Pomel

= Centaurea acaulis =

Species of plant

Centaurea acaulis, the stemless star thistle, is a species of plant in the family Asteraceae.

== Sources ==
This article incorporates text from a free content work. Licensed under CC0 (license statement/permission). Text taken from Centaurea acaulis. Encyclopedia of Life.
