= Cnicin =

Names
- Preferred IUPAC name (3aR,4S,6E,10Z,11aR)-10-(Hydroxymethyl)-6-methyl-3-methylidene-2-oxo-2,3,3a,4,5,8,9,11a-octahydrocyclodeca[b]furan-4-yl (3R)-3,4-dihydroxy-2-methylidenebutanoate

Identifiers
CAS Number	24394-09-0
3D model (JSmol)	Interactive image
ChEMBL	ChEMBL1257707
ChemSpider	4444781
ECHA InfoCard	100.042.004
PubChem CID	5281435
UNII	C998MWY30L
CompTox Dashboard (EPA)	DTXSID90878518
- InChI: InChI=1S/C20H26O7/c1-11-5-4-6-14(9-21)8-17-18(13(3)20(25)27-17)16(7-11)26-19(24)12(2)15(23)10-22/h5,8,15-18,21-23H,2-4,6-7,9-10H2,1H3/b11-5+,14-8-/t15-,16-,17+,18+/m0/s1 Key: ZTDFZLVUIVPZDU-QGNHJMHWSA-N; InChI=1/C20H26O7/c1-11-5-4-6-14(9-21)8-17-18(13(3)20(25)27-17)16(7-11)26-19(24)12(2)15(23)10-22/h5,8,15-18,21-23H,2-4,6-7,9-10H2,1H3/b11-5+,14-8-/t15-,16-,17+,18+/m0/s1 Key: ZTDFZLVUIVPZDU-QGNHJMHWBP
- SMILES: O=C/1O[C@@H]2/C=C(/CC/C=C(/C[C@H](OC(=O)\C(=C)[C@@H](O)CO)[C@H]2C\1=C)C)CO

Properties
Chemical formula	C_{20}H_{26}O_{7}
Molar mass	378.421 g·mol^{−1}
- Except where otherwise noted, data are given for materials in their standard state (at 25 °C [77 °F], 100 kPa). verify (what is ?) Infobox references

Cnicin is a sesquiterpene lactone, esterified with a substituted acrylic acid, and belonging to the germacranolide class of natural products. It is mainly found in Cnicus (Centaurea--formerly Cnicus--benedictus L. (Asteraceae)), and is present in spotted knapweed plants, where highest and lowest concentrations are found in the leaves (0.86-3.86% cnicin) and stems respectively. Cnicin is used as a bitter tonic and the bitterness value is approximately 1,500.
