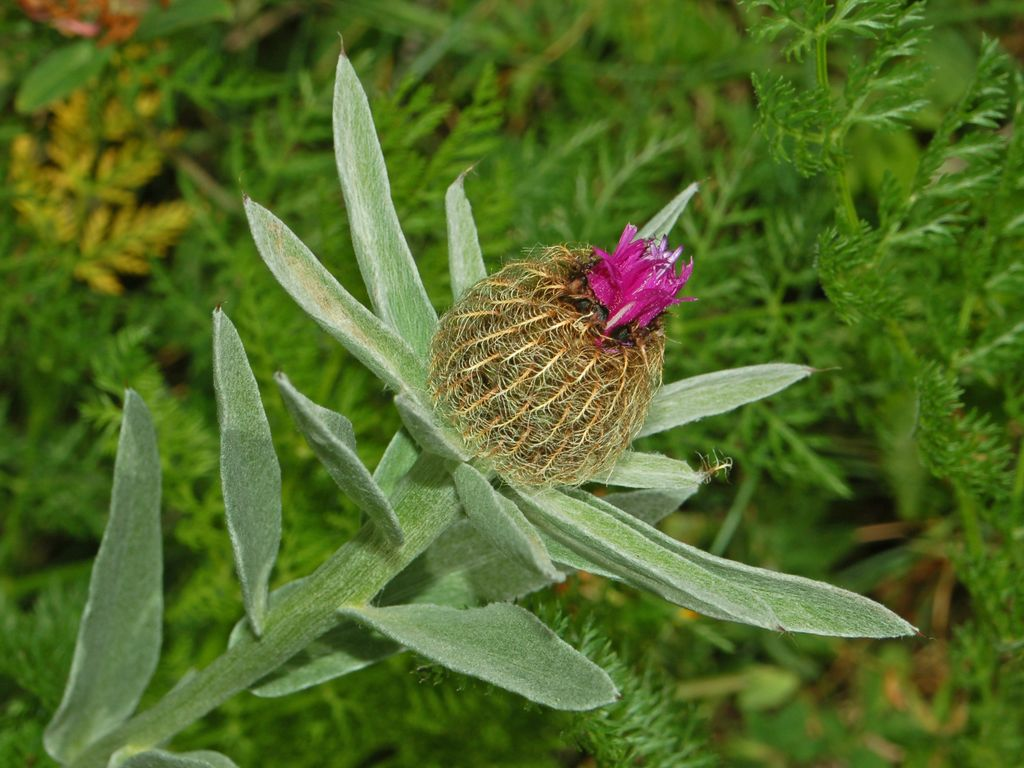

Scientific classification
- Kingdom: Plantae
- Clade: Tracheophytes
- Clade: Angiosperms
- Clade: Eudicots
- Clade: Asterids
- Order: Asterales
- Family: Asteraceae
- Genus: Centaurea
- Species: C. uniflora

Binomial name
- Centaurea uniflora Turra

= Centaurea uniflora =

Species of flowering plant

Centaurea uniflora, the singleflower knapweed, is a perennial herbaceous plant belonging to the genus Centaurea of the family Asteraceae.

== Description ==
Centaurea uniflora reaches a height of 40–50 cm. It is densely covered with short rough hair. The stem is erect, leafy and has only one showy purplish-pink flower. The green-gray leaves are dotted, narrowly lanceolate and smaller than one centimeter. The flowering period extends from July to September. The achenes are grayish brown.

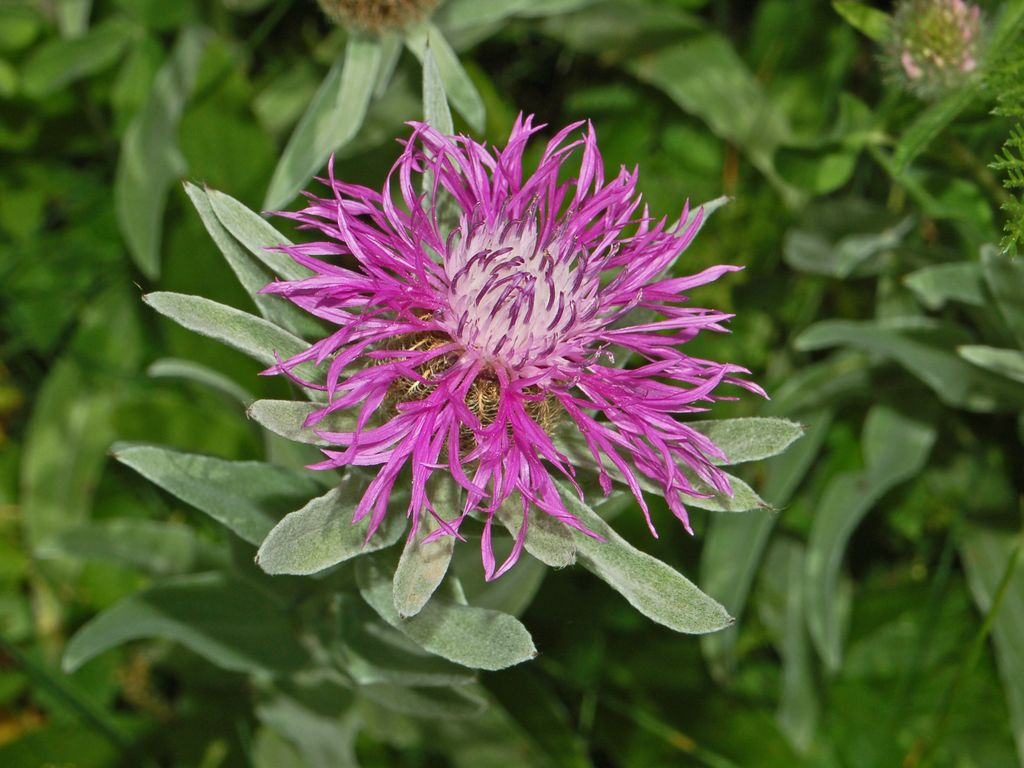
Flower of Centaurea uniflora

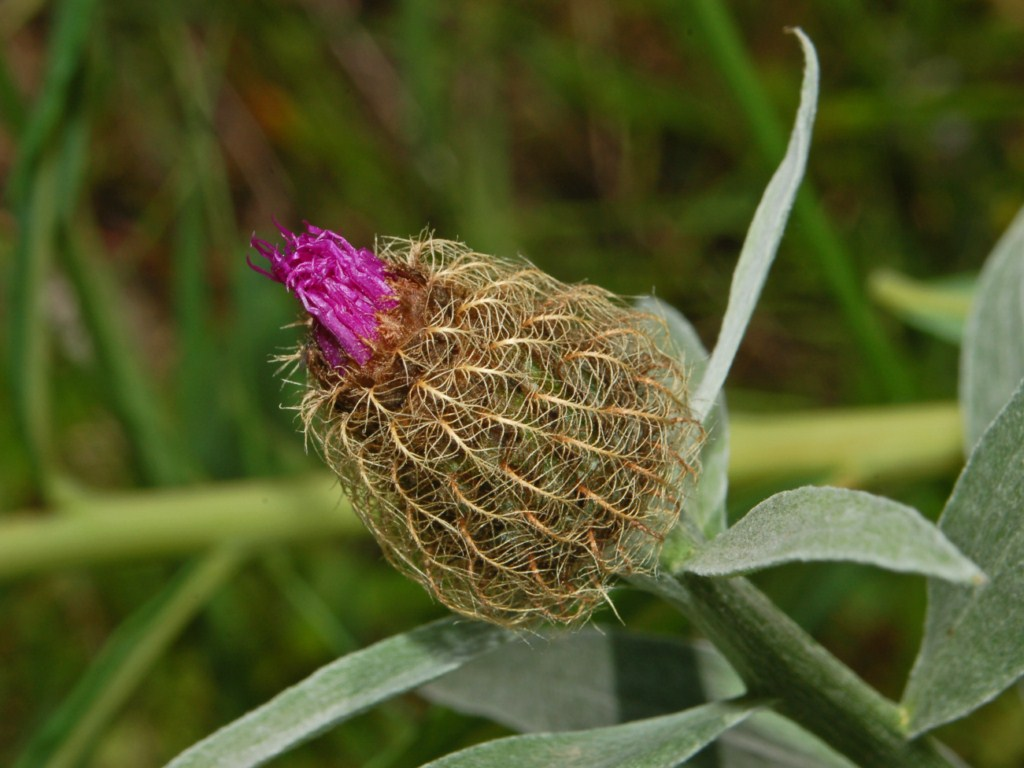
Flower of Centaurea uniflora

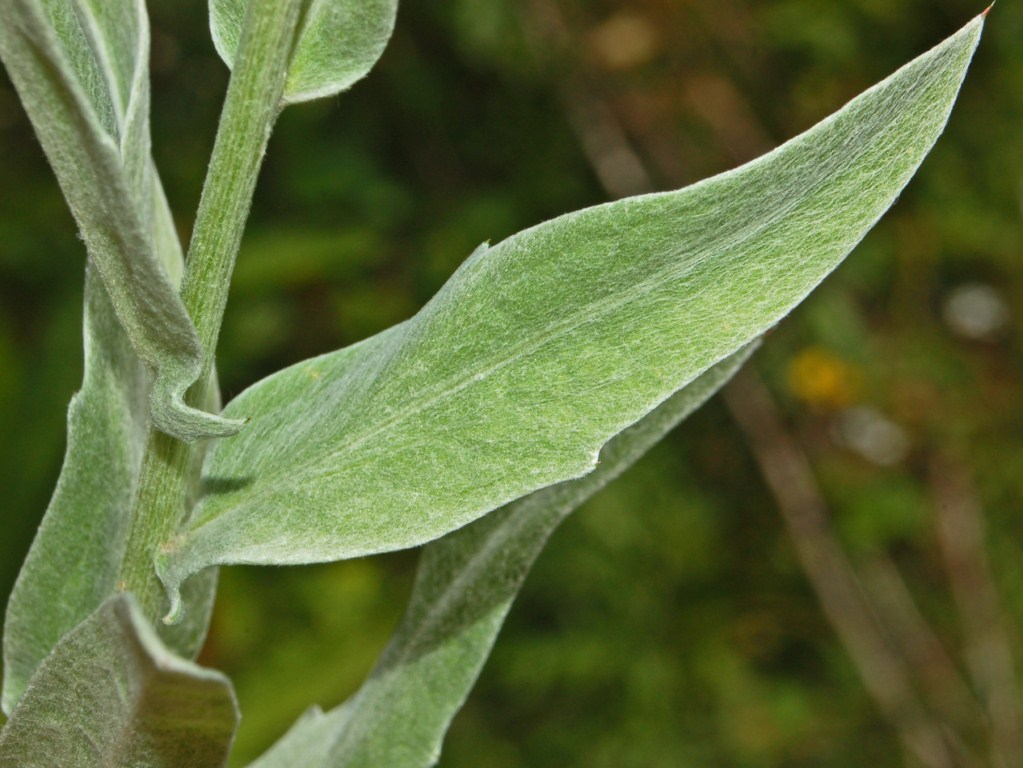
Leaves of Centaurea uniflora

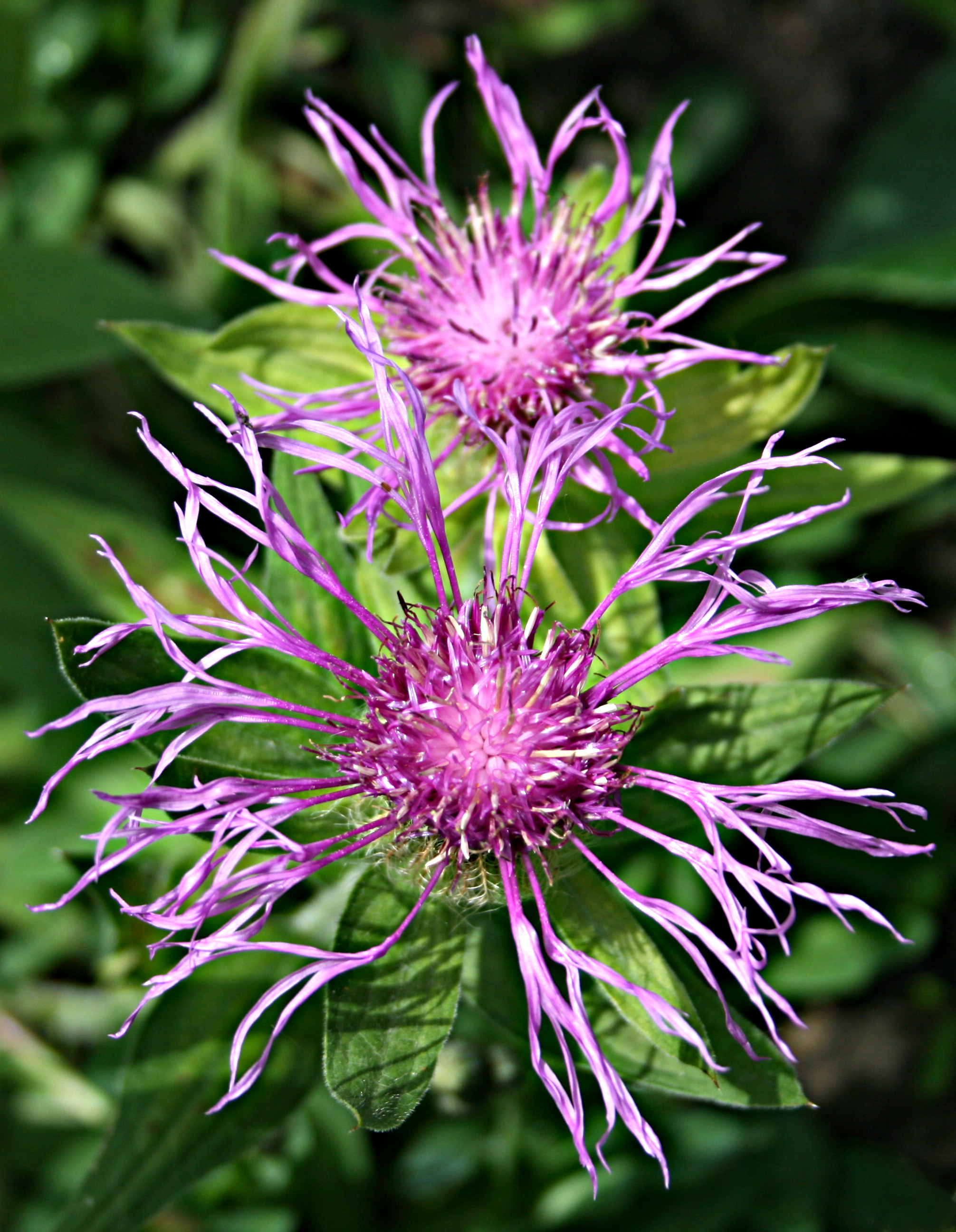
Flower of Centaurea uniflora

== Distribution ==
Centaurea uniflora is distributed in Austria, Albania, Bulgaria, Montenegro, France, Greece, Italy, Hungary, North Macedonia, Romania, Slovenia, Serbia and Switzerland.

== Habitat ==
This alpine plant occurs in the mountainous areas of the south-east Europe at altitudes above 1500 m, on warm, dry and nutrient-rich soils found in meadows and hillsides.

== Subspecies ==
- Centaurea uniflora subsp. davidovii (Urum.) Dostál
- Centaurea uniflora subsp. ferdinandi (Gren.) Bonnier
- Centaurea uniflora subsp. nervosa (Willd.) Bonnier et Layens
- Centaurea uniflora subsp. uniflora
