= Centaurea drabifolioides =

Conservation status
- Critically Endangered (IUCN 3.1)

Scientific classification
- Kingdom: Plantae
- Clade: Tracheophytes
- Clade: Angiosperms
- Clade: Eudicots
- Clade: Asterids
- Order: Asterales
- Family: Asteraceae
- Genus: Centaurea
- Species: C. drabifolioides

Binomial name
- Centaurea drabifolioides Hub.-Mor.

Species of plant

Centaurea drabifolioides, the whitlow-grass-leaved centaury, is a species of flowering plant in the Asteraceae family.

== Distribution ==
Its natural range is Turkey.

== Taxonomy ==
It was named by Arthur Huber-Morath, in Bauhinia 3: 322, t. 29. in 1967.
