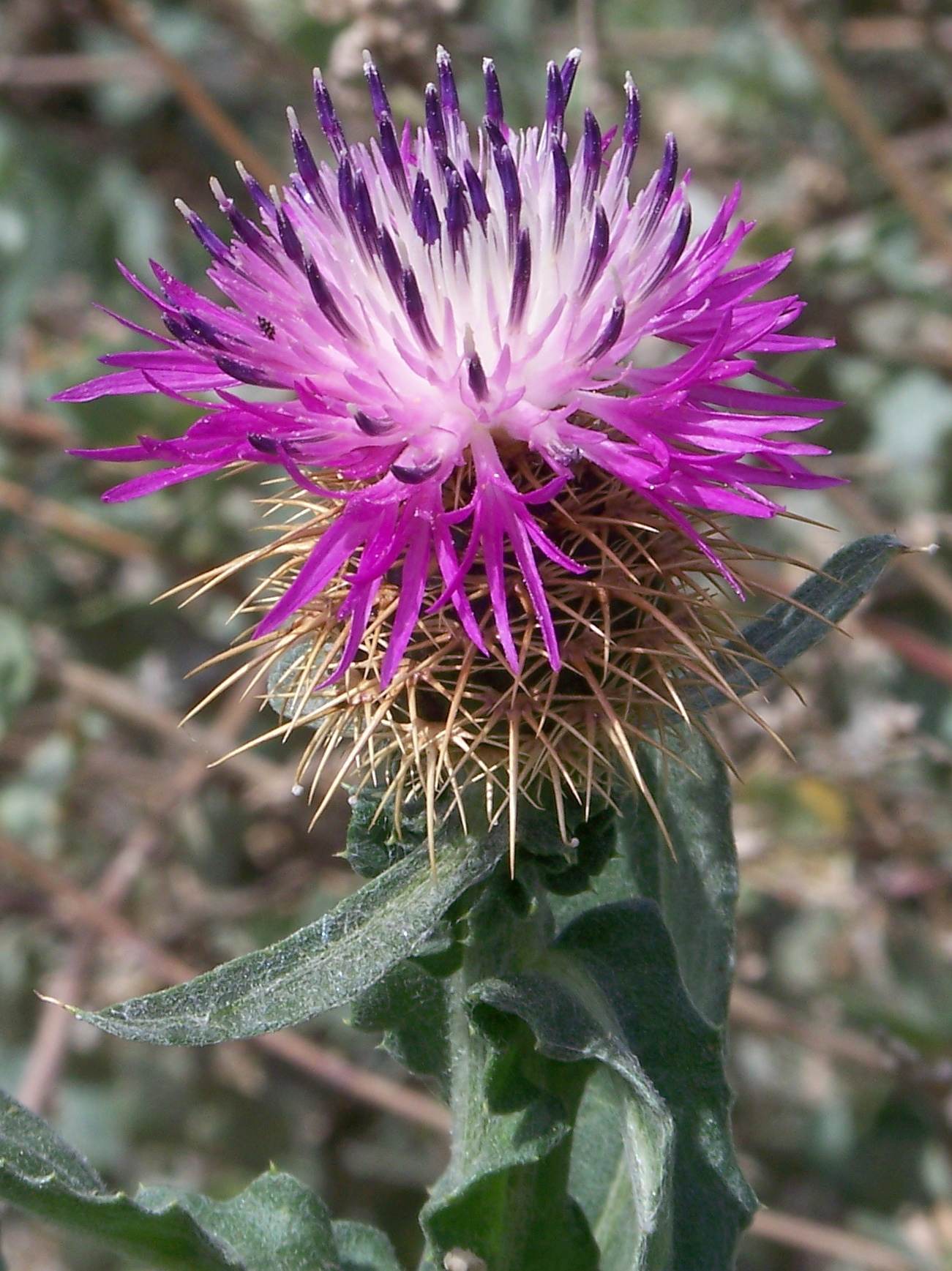

Scientific classification
- Kingdom: Plantae
- Clade: Tracheophytes
- Clade: Angiosperms
- Clade: Eudicots
- Clade: Asterids
- Order: Asterales
- Family: Asteraceae
- Genus: Centaurea
- Species: C. seridis

Binomial name
- Centaurea seridis L., 1753

= Centaurea seridis =

Species of flowering plant

Centaurea seridis is a species of Centaurea found in the Western Mediterranean.
