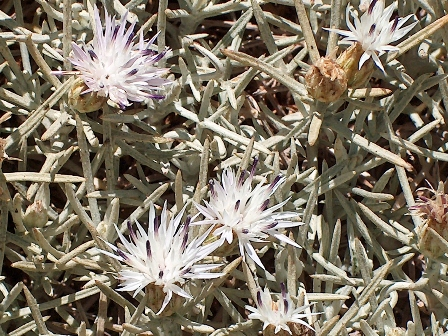
- Centaurea horrida, in situ in Sardinia

Scientific classification
- Kingdom: Plantae
- Clade: Tracheophytes
- Clade: Angiosperms
- Clade: Eudicots
- Clade: Asterids
- Order: Asterales
- Family: Asteraceae
- Genus: Centaurea
- Species: C. horrida

Binomial name
- Centaurea horrida Badarò, 1824

= Centaurea horrida =

Species of flowering plant

Centaurea horrida is a species of the genus Centaurea which is only found growing in Sardinia and associated islands. Due to their limited ability to disperse, they are isolated from other environments, and have a very low colonizing ability.

It is a parent of the hybrid C. × forsythiana.

In 1992, C. horrida was designated as a 'priority species' under Annex II of the Habitats Directive of the European Community (which was reformed as the European Union the following year). This designation was meant to serve as the basis for Italy to declare which areas in which it occurs are 'Special Areas of Conservation' -which were to form the backbone of the Natura 2000 network, but only if these areas include one of the number of habitats listed in Annex I of the directive.
