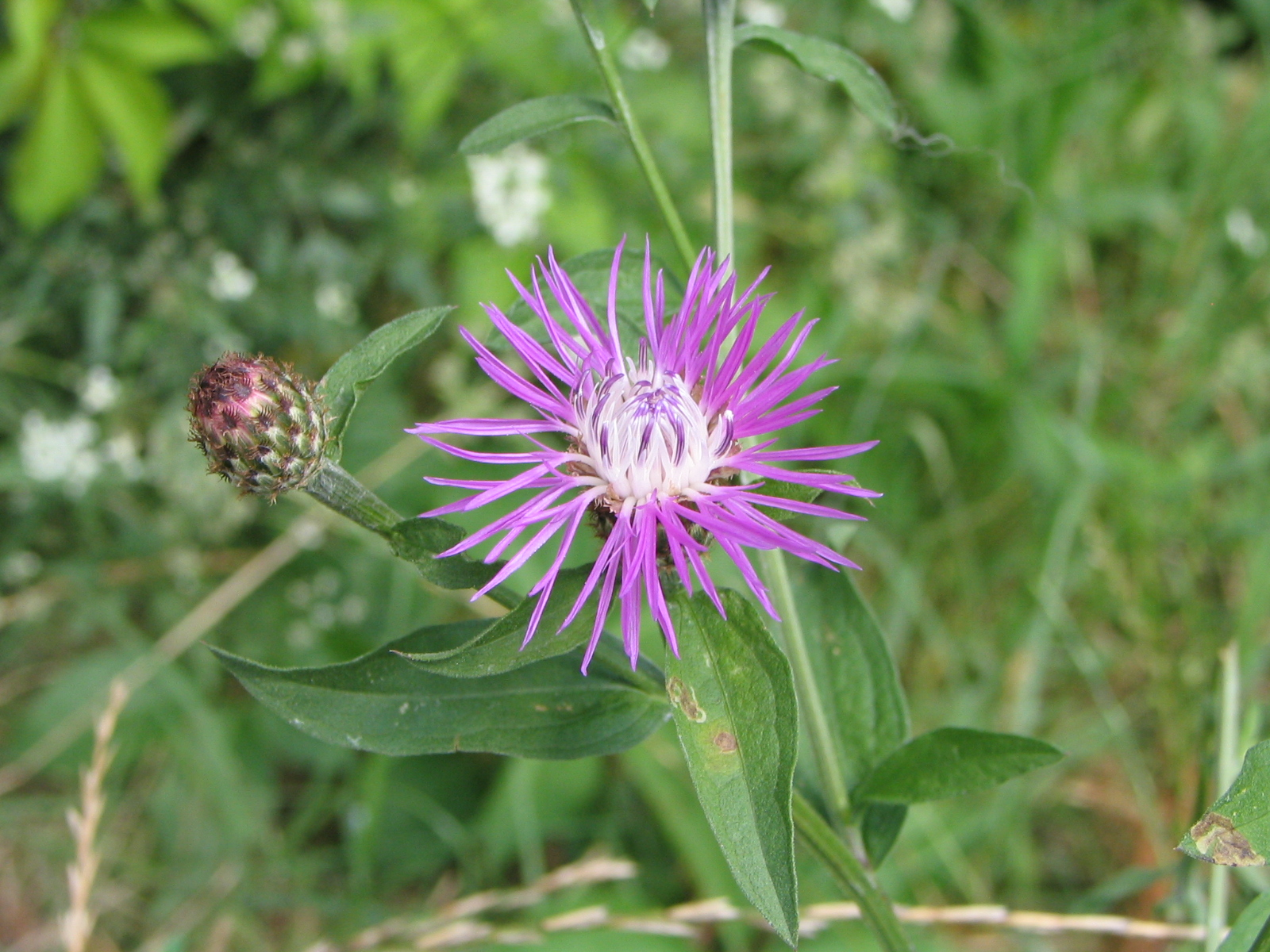

Scientific classification
- Kingdom: Plantae
- Clade: Tracheophytes
- Clade: Angiosperms
- Clade: Eudicots
- Clade: Asterids
- Order: Asterales
- Family: Asteraceae
- Genus: Centaurea
- Species: C. nigrescens

Binomial name
- Centaurea nigrescens Willd.

Synonyms
- Centaurea dubia Suter

= Centaurea nigrescens =

Species of plant

Centaurea nigrescens, the Tyrol knapweed, short-fringed knapweed or Tyrol thistle, is a perennial plant in the genus Centaurea that grows natively in Central and South-eastern Europe (from Southern Germany and Northern Italy to Romania and Bulgaria). It has also been introduced and is now a noxious weed in the Northern United States, Canada, and Southern Australia. It has purple flowers and it flowers in the summer (June to September).
