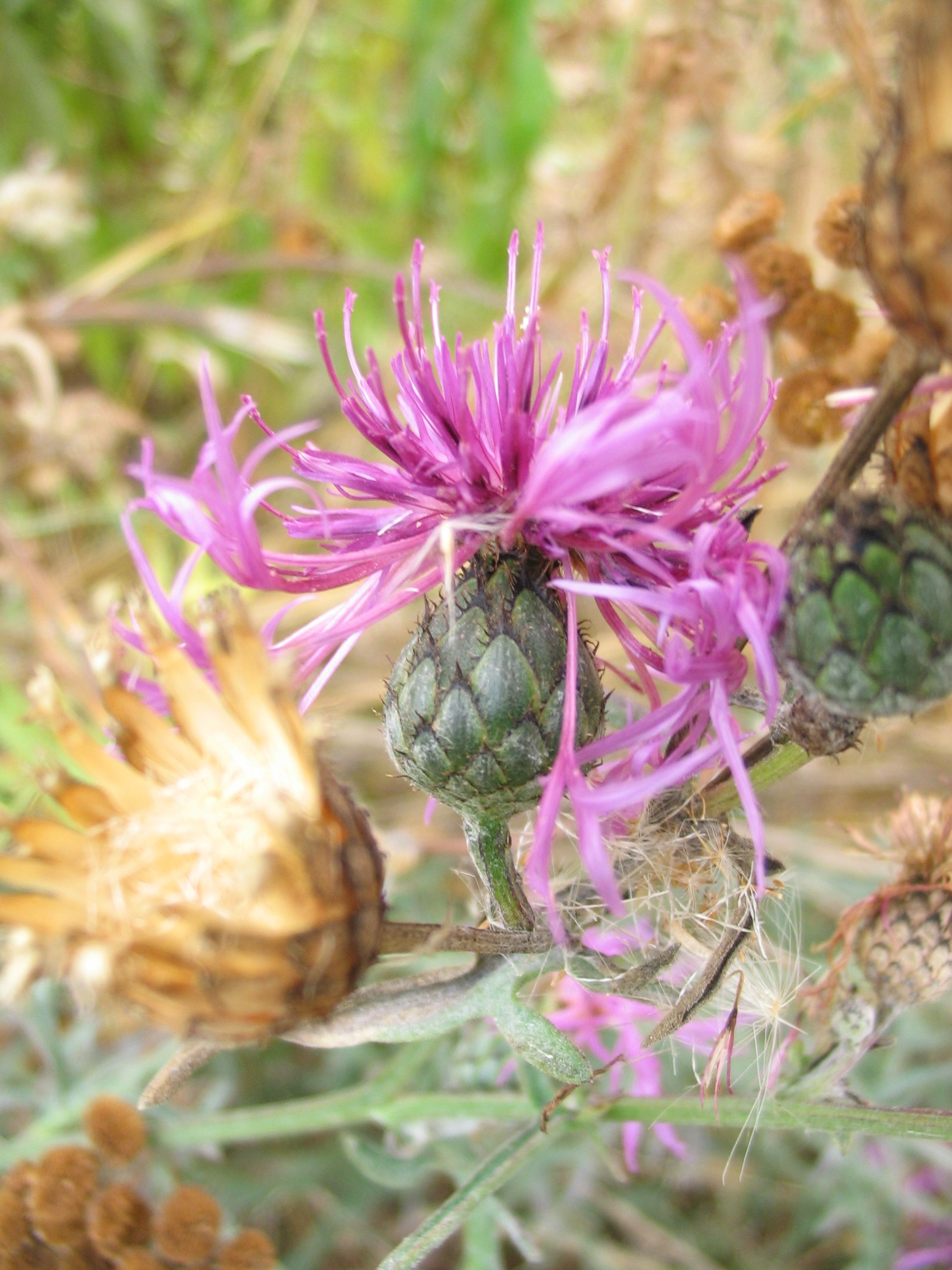
- Inflorescence

Scientific classification
- Kingdom: Plantae
- Clade: Tracheophytes
- Clade: Angiosperms
- Clade: Eudicots
- Clade: Asterids
- Order: Asterales
- Family: Asteraceae
- Genus: Centaurea
- Species: C. sadleriana

Binomial name
- Centaurea sadleriana Janka

= Centaurea sadleriana =

Species of flowering plant

Centaurea sadleriana, the Pannonian knapweed, is a Pannonian sub-endemic plant, mostly found in the Pannonian Basin. It grows up to 2 m tall, and has purple or pinkish flowers, which blossom from May to late October.

This plant likes dry habitats, prefers loess and sandy soil. It can be found on lowlands and also on hilly habitats.

This species is not endangered yet, but the world population is so small (it grows only in Hungary and its border regions) that it has become protected in Hungary, and is listed on the European Red List of Endangered Plants.
