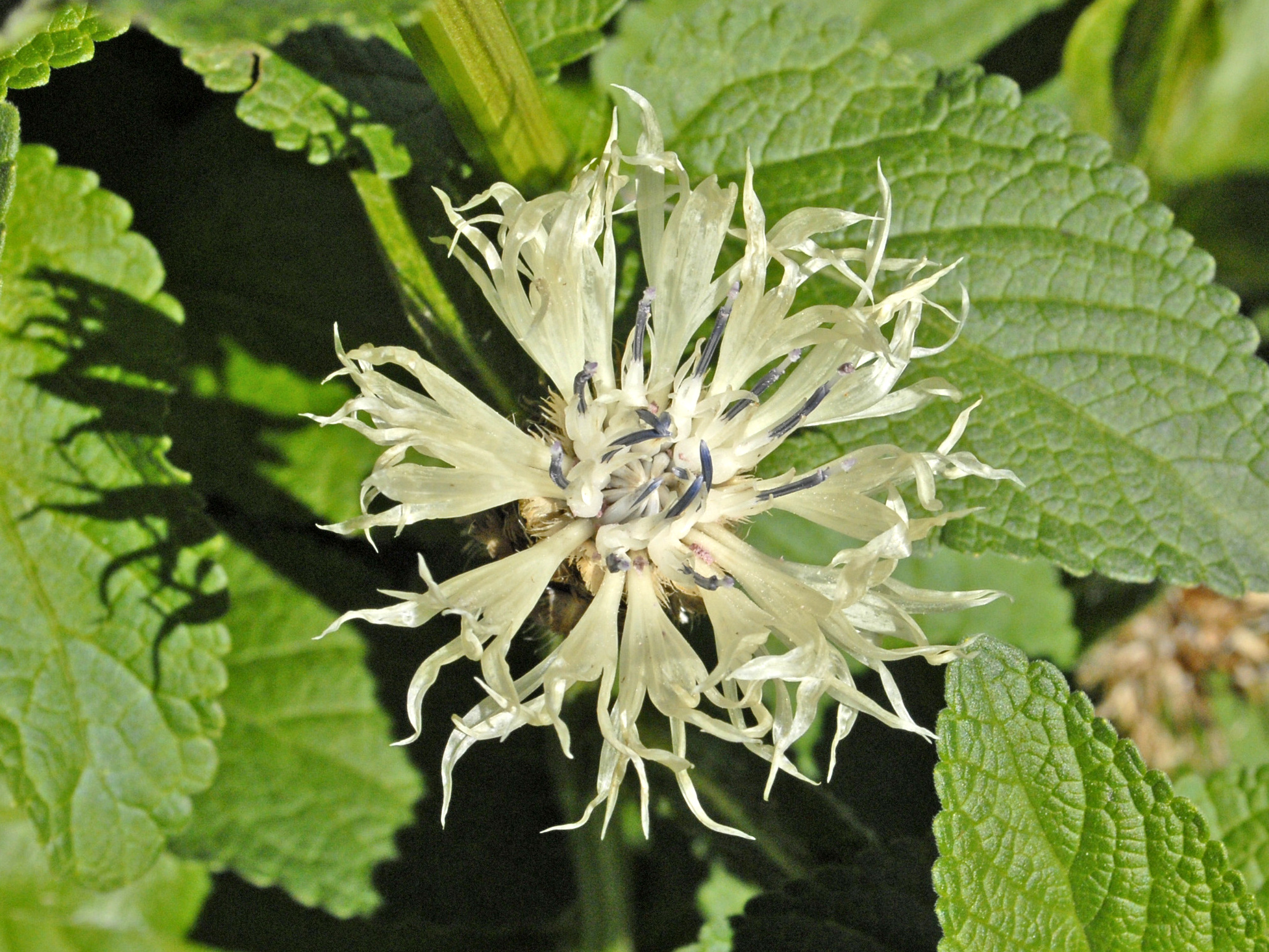
- Flower of Centaurea fischeri

Scientific classification
- Kingdom: Plantae
- Clade: Tracheophytes
- Clade: Angiosperms
- Clade: Eudicots
- Clade: Asterids
- Order: Asterales
- Family: Asteraceae
- Genus: Centaurea
- Species: C. fischeri

Binomial name
- Centaurea fischeri Willd.

Synonyms
- Centaurea cheiranthifolia

= Centaurea fischeri =

Species of flowering plant

Centaurea fischeri is a species of flowering plant in the family Asteraceae.

== Description ==
Centaurea fischeri can reach a height of 40–70 centimetres (16–28 in). These plants show a greyish pubescence and petiolate lanceolate leaves 15–25 centimetres (5.9–9.8 in) long. Flowers are cream-white to pink-lilac, with a diameter of about 9 centimetres (3.5 in).

== Distribution ==
These plants are native to Caucasus. They can be found in alpine and subalpine meadows.
