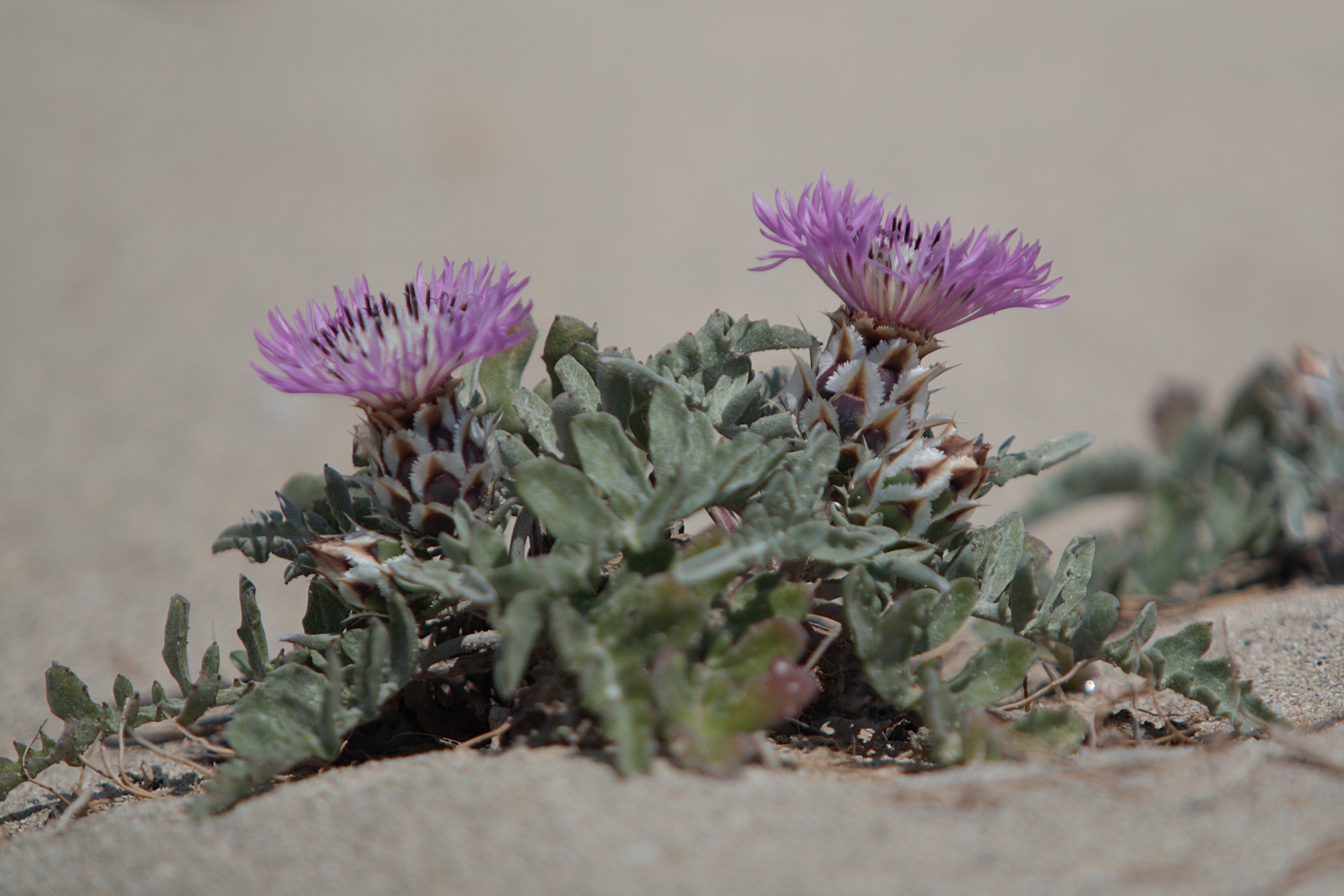

Scientific classification
- Kingdom: Plantae
- Clade: Tracheophytes
- Clade: Angiosperms
- Clade: Eudicots
- Clade: Asterids
- Order: Asterales
- Family: Asteraceae
- Genus: Centaurea
- Species: C. pumilio

Binomial name
- Centaurea pumilio L. 1755

= Centaurea pumilio =

Species of flowering plant

Centaurea pumilio is a rare sand-loving species of the eastern Mediterranean. In Crete it is found only on the beaches of Elafonisos, Tigani to Balos on the Gramvoussa peninsula and Falasarna. It flowers in April and May. Centaurea pumilio is included in the IUCN Red Data List in the category of threatened plants. Flowers are pink and hermaphrodite.
