= Centaurea caroli-henrici =

Conservation status
- Critically Endangered (IUCN 3.1)

Scientific classification
- Kingdom: Plantae
- Clade: Tracheophytes
- Clade: Angiosperms
- Clade: Eudicots
- Clade: Asterids
- Order: Asterales
- Family: Asteraceae
- Genus: Centaurea
- Species: C. caroli-henrici

Binomial name
- Centaurea caroli-henrici Gabrieljan & Dittrich.

Species of plant

Centaurea caroli-henrici, the Karl-henrikh's centaury, is a species of flowering plant in the Asteraceae family.

== Distribution ==
Its natural habitat is the Transcaucasus.

== Taxonomy ==
It was named by Manfred Dittrich, and Elenora Tzolakovna Gabrieljan, in Candollea, 48(1): 245. in 1993.
