= Centaurea leptophylla =

Conservation status
- Critically Endangered (IUCN 3.1)

Scientific classification
- Kingdom: Plantae
- Clade: Tracheophytes
- Clade: Angiosperms
- Clade: Eudicots
- Clade: Asterids
- Order: Asterales
- Family: Asteraceae
- Genus: Centaurea
- Species: C. leptophylla

Binomial name
- Centaurea leptophylla (K.Koch) Tchich.

Synonyms
- Centaurium leptophyllum K.Koch; Psephellus leptophyllus (K.Koch) Boiss.

Species of plant

Centaurea leptophylla, the thin-leaved centaury, is a species of flowering plant in the family Asteraceae. The IUCN has classified the species as critically endangered. It is native to Turkey.

== Taxonomy ==
It was named by Karl Koch in Linnaea 24: 419 in 1851.
