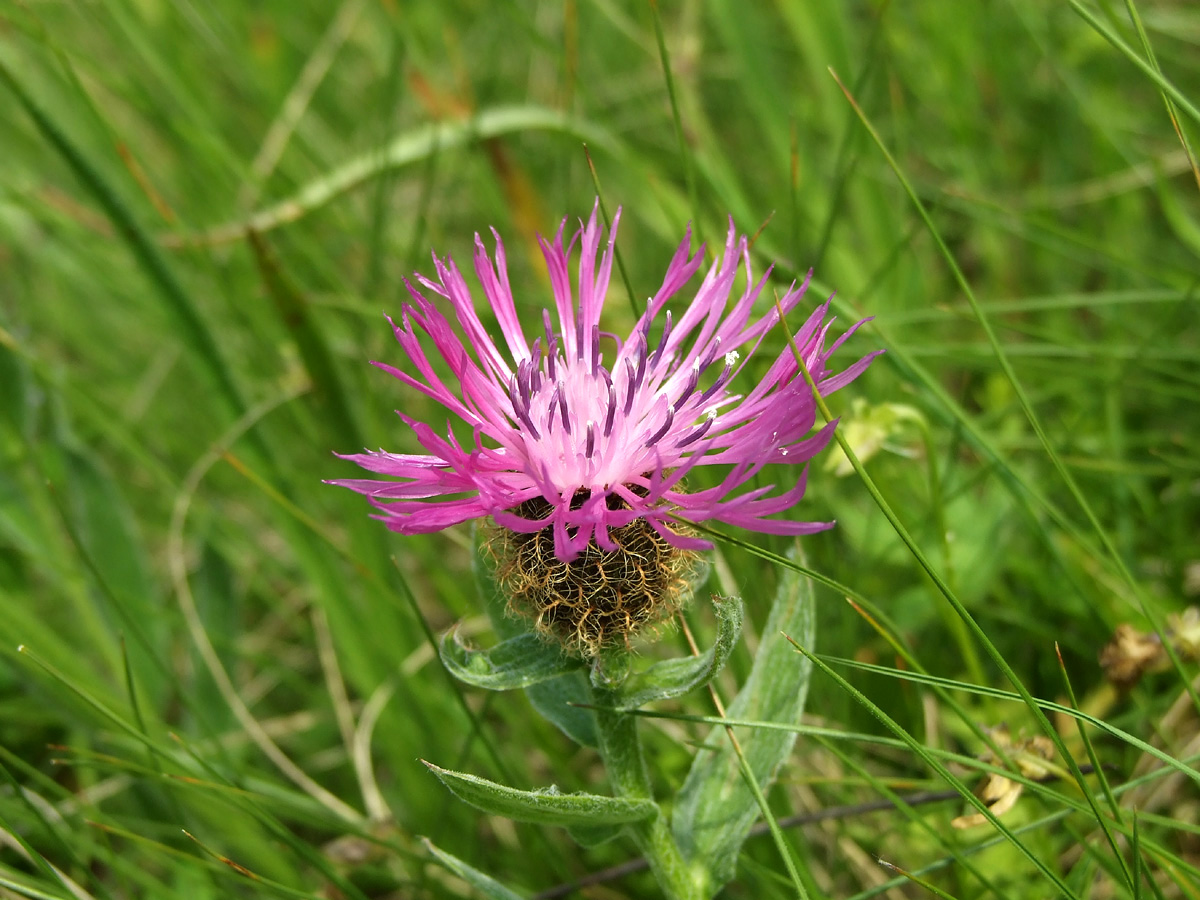

Scientific classification
- Kingdom: Plantae
- Clade: Tracheophytes
- Clade: Angiosperms
- Clade: Eudicots
- Clade: Asterids
- Order: Asterales
- Family: Asteraceae
- Genus: Centaurea
- Species: C. nervosa

Binomial name
- Centaurea nervosa Willd. 1809

= Centaurea nervosa =

Species of flowering plant

Centaurea nervosa is a species of Centaurea found in Italy in the North ( in the Alps ) where it is common, the Tuscan- Emilian where it is rare, Outside Italy in the Alps and in the French Alpine departments, in the cantons of Valais, Ticino and Graubünden of Switzerland, the provinces of Carinthia in Austria, in the Carpathian Mountains of Slovenia.
