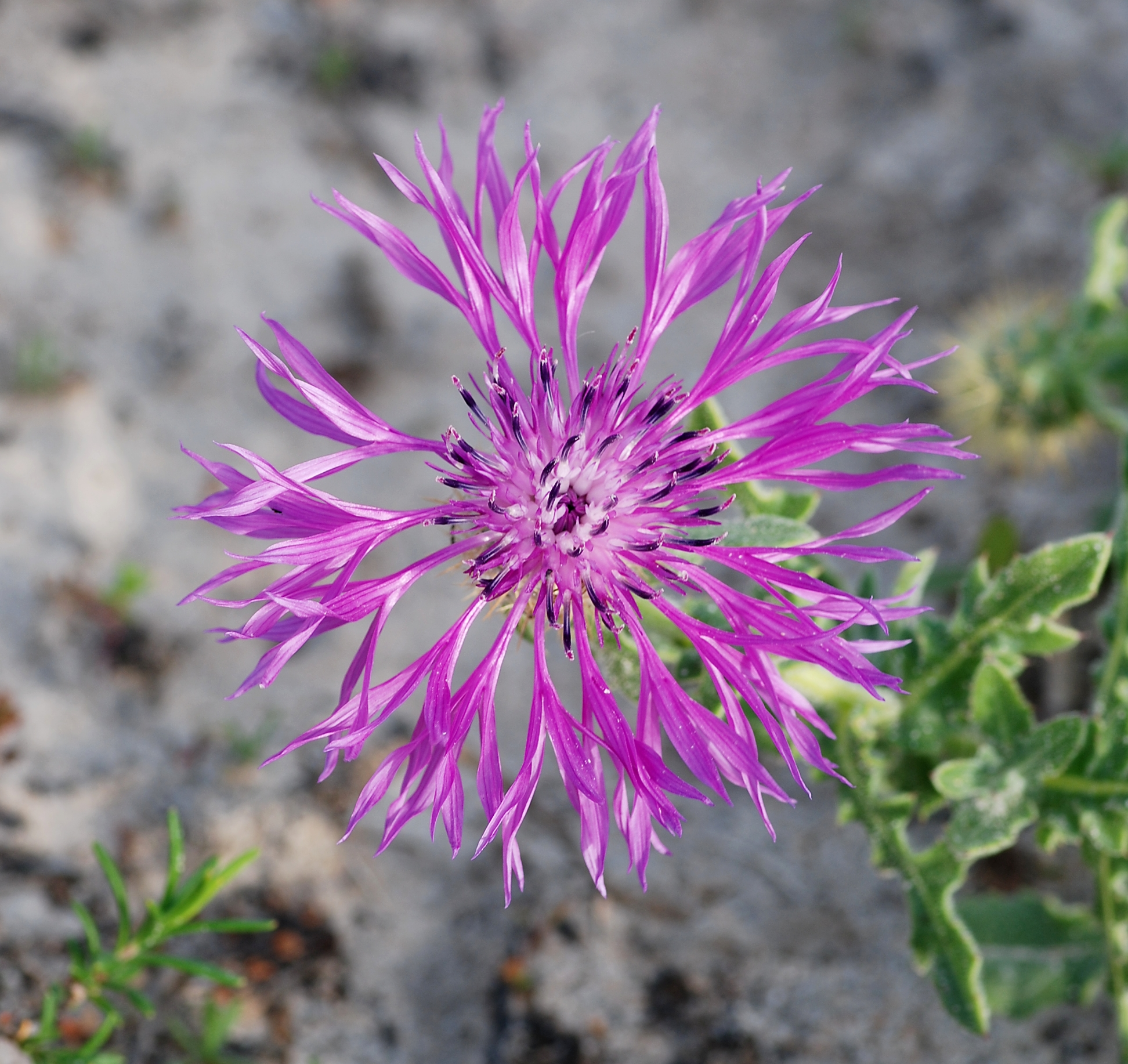

Scientific classification
- Kingdom: Plantae
- Clade: Tracheophytes
- Clade: Angiosperms
- Clade: Eudicots
- Clade: Asterids
- Order: Asterales
- Family: Asteraceae
- Genus: Centaurea
- Species: C. sphaerocephala

Binomial name
- Centaurea sphaerocephala L. 1753

= Centaurea sphaerocephala =

Species of flowering plant

Centaurea sphaerocephala is a species of Centaurea found in the Iberian Peninsula.
