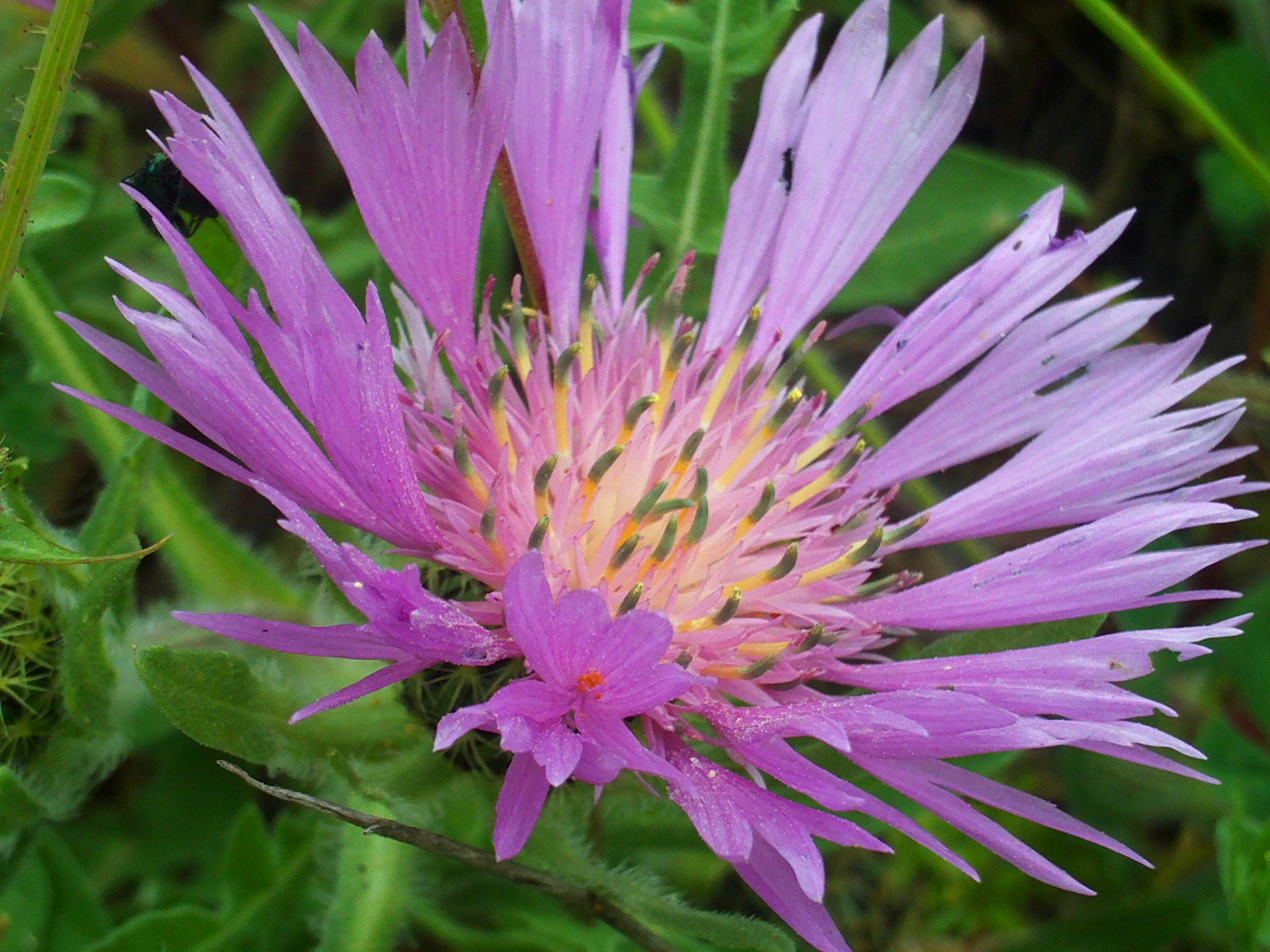

Scientific classification
- Kingdom: Plantae
- Clade: Tracheophytes
- Clade: Angiosperms
- Clade: Eudicots
- Clade: Asterids
- Order: Asterales
- Family: Asteraceae
- Genus: Centaurea
- Species: C. pullata

Binomial name
- Centaurea pullata L. 1753

= Centaurea pullata =

Species of flowering plant

Centaurea pullata is a species of Centaurea found in Southwest Europe and Northwest Africa.
