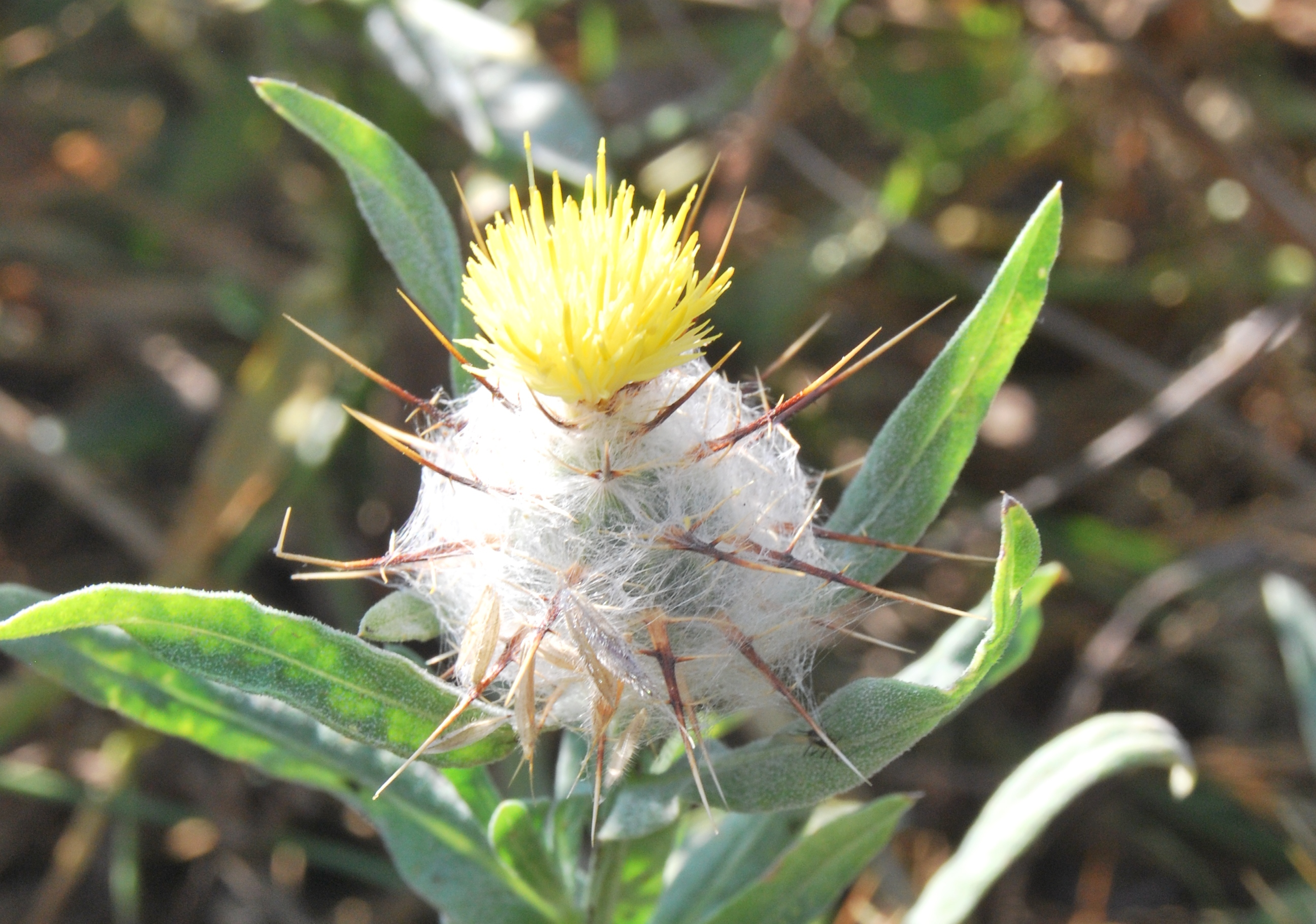

Scientific classification
- Kingdom: Plantae
- Clade: Tracheophytes
- Clade: Angiosperms
- Clade: Eudicots
- Clade: Asterids
- Order: Asterales
- Family: Asteraceae
- Genus: Centaurea
- Species: C. eriophora

Binomial name
- Centaurea eriophora L. 1753

= Centaurea eriophora =

Species of flowering plant

Centaurea eriophora is a species of Centaurea found in Spain in Los Alcores, Litoral onubense, Campiña Baja, Campiña Alta, Portugal (Algarve), and North Africa.
