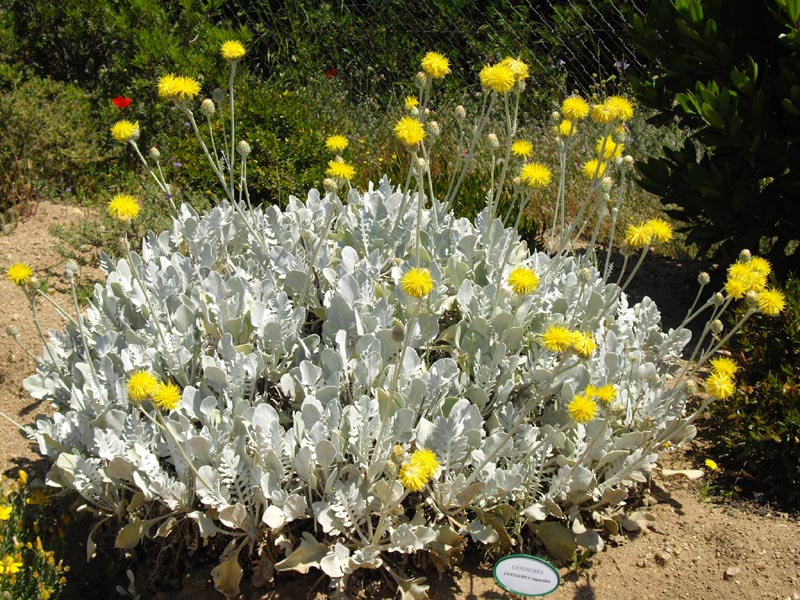

Scientific classification
- Kingdom: Plantae
- Clade: Tracheophytes
- Clade: Angiosperms
- Clade: Eudicots
- Clade: Asterids
- Order: Asterales
- Family: Asteraceae
- Genus: Centaurea
- Species: C. ragusina

Binomial name
- Centaurea ragusina L. (1753)

Subspecies
- Centaurea ragusina subsp. lungensis (Ginzb.) Hayek; Centaurea ragusina subsp. ragusina

Synonyms
- Colymbada ragusina (L.) Holub

= Centaurea ragusina =

Species of flowering plant

Centaurea ragusina, commonly known as Dalmatian knapweed, is a species of Centaurea endemic to coastal Dalmatia in southern Croatia. It is an herbaceous perennial subshrub which grows in crevices on coastal cliffs.

Two subspecies are accepted.

- Centaurea ragusina subsp. lungensis (Ginzb.) Hayek
- Centaurea ragusina subsp. ragusina
