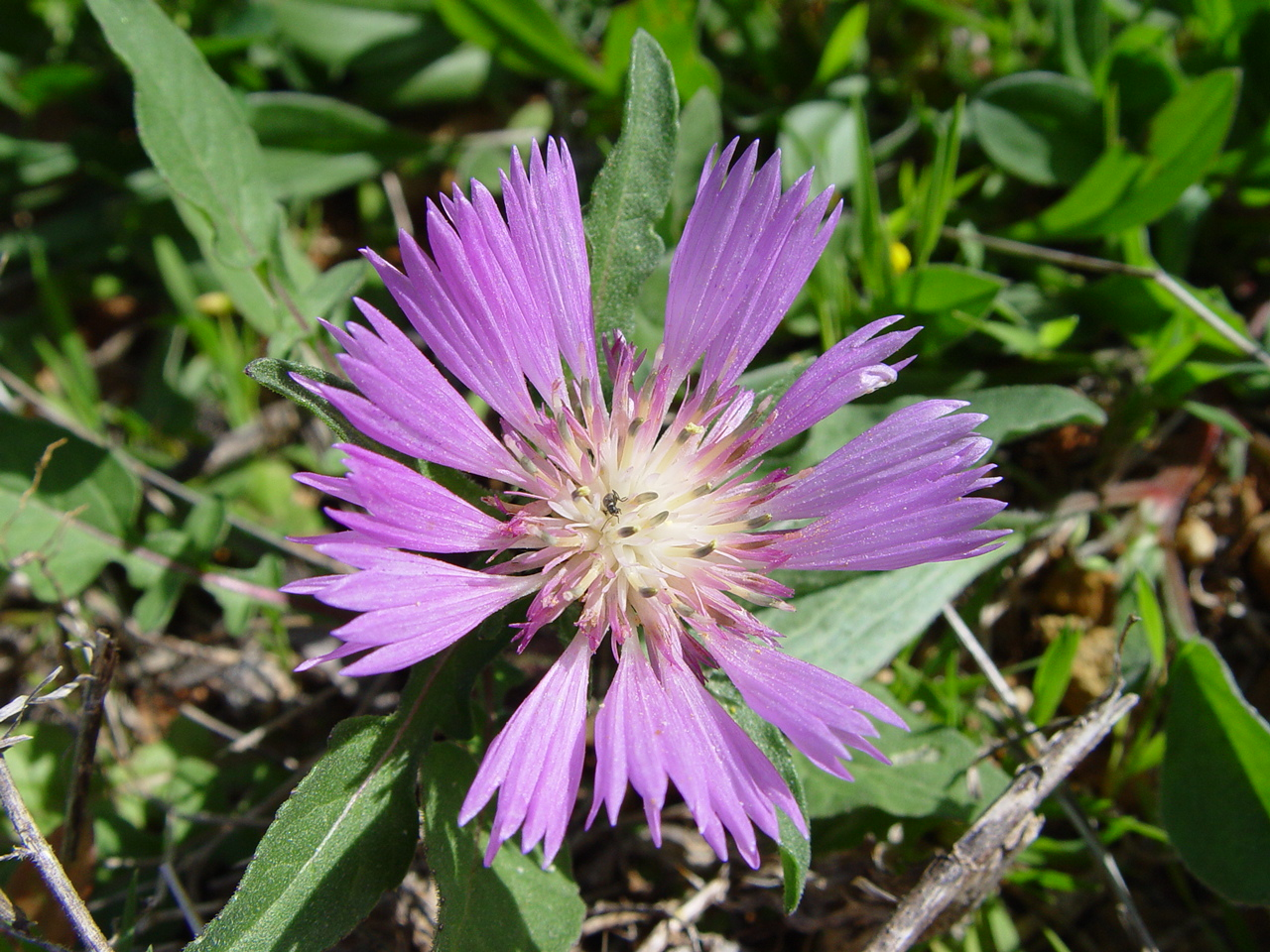
- Centaurea pullata

Scientific classification
- Kingdom: Plantae
- Clade: Embryophytes
- Clade: Tracheophytes
- Clade: Spermatophytes
- Clade: Angiosperms
- Clade: Eudicots
- Clade: Asterids
- Order: Asterales
- Family: Asteraceae
- Subfamily: Carduoideae
- Tribe: Cardueae
- Subtribe: Centaureinae
- Genus: Centaurea; L.

Type species
- Centaurea paniculata L.

Diversity
- Over 700 species

Synonyms
- List: Acosta DC.; × Acostitrapa Rauschert; Acrocentron Cass.; Acrolophus Cass.; Alophium Cass.; Ammocyanus (Boiss.) Dostál; Antaurea Neck.; Behen Hill; Benedicta Bernh.; Calcitrapa Heist. ex Fabr.; Calcitrapoides Fabr.; Carbeni Adans.; Carbenia Adans.; Cardosanctus Bubani; Cestrinus Cass.; Chartolepis Cass.; Cheirolepis Boiss.; Chrysopappus Takht.; Cistrum Hill; Cnicus L.; × Colycea Fern.Casas & Susanna; × Colymbacosta Rauschert; Colymbada Hill; Crepula Hill; Cyanus Mill.; Cynaroides (Boiss. ex Walp.) Dostál; Eremopappus Takht.; Erinacella (Rech.f.) Dostál; Eriopha Hill; Grossheimia Sosn. & Takht.; Heraclea Hill; Hierapicra Kuntze; Hippophaestum Gray; Hookia Neck.; Hyalea Jaub. & Spach; Hymenocentron Cass.; Jacea Mill.; × Jaceacosta Rauschert; × Jaceitrapa Rauschert; Lepteranthus Neck. ex Fourr.; Leucacantha Nieuwl. & Lunell; Leucantha Gray; Lopholoma Cass.; Melanoloma Cass.; Menomphalus Pomel; Mesocentron Cass.; Microlophus Cass.; Paraphysis (DC.) Dostál; Pectinastrum Cass.; Petrodavisia Holub; Phaeopappus (DC.) Boiss.; Phalolepis Cass.; Philostizus Cass.; Phrygia (Pers.) Bosc; Piptoceras Cass.; Platylophus Cass.; Plumosipappus Czerep.; Podia Neck.; Polyacantha Gray; Psora Hill; Pterolophus Cass.; Pycnocomus Hill; Rhacoma Adans.; Sagmen Hill.; Seridia Juss.; Setachna Dulac; Solstitiaria Hill; Sphaerocephala Hill; Spilacron Cass.; Staebe Hill; Stenolophus Cass.; Stephanochilus Coss. ex Maire; Tetramorphaea DC.; Tomanthea DC.; Triplocentron Cass.; Veltis Adans.; Verutina Cass.; Wagenitzia Dostál

= Centaurea =

Genus of flowering plants

Centaurea (/ˌsɛntɔːˈriːə/) is a genus of over 700 species of herbaceous thistle-like flowering plants in the family Asteraceae. Members of the genus are found only north of the equator, mostly in the Eastern Hemisphere; the Middle East and surrounding regions are particularly species-rich.

== Common names ==
Common names for this genus are centaury, centory, starthistles, knapweeds, centaureas and the more ambiguous bluets; a vernacular name used for these plants in parts of England is loggerheads (common knapweed). The Plectocephalus group – possibly a distinct genus – is known as basketflowers. Cornflower is used for a few species, but that term more often specifically means either C. cyanus (the annual cornflower) or Centaurea montana (the perennial cornflower). The common name centaury is sometimes used, although this also refers to the unrelated plant genus Centaurium.

The name is said to be in reference to Chiron, the centaur of Greek mythology who discovered medicinal uses of a plant eventually called "centaury".

== Description ==
Knapweeds are robust weedy plants. Their leaves, spiny in some species, are usually deeply divided into elongated lobes at least in the plants' lower part, becoming entire towards the top. The "flowers" (actually pseudanthium inflorescences) are diverse in colour, ranging from intense blues, reds and yellows to any mixture of these and lighter shades towards white. Often, the disk flowers are much darker or lighter than the ray flowers, which also differ in morphology and are sterile. Each pseudanthium sits atop a cup- or basket-like cluster of scaly bracts, hence the name "basketflowers". Many species, in particular those inhabiting more arid regions, have a long and strong taproot.

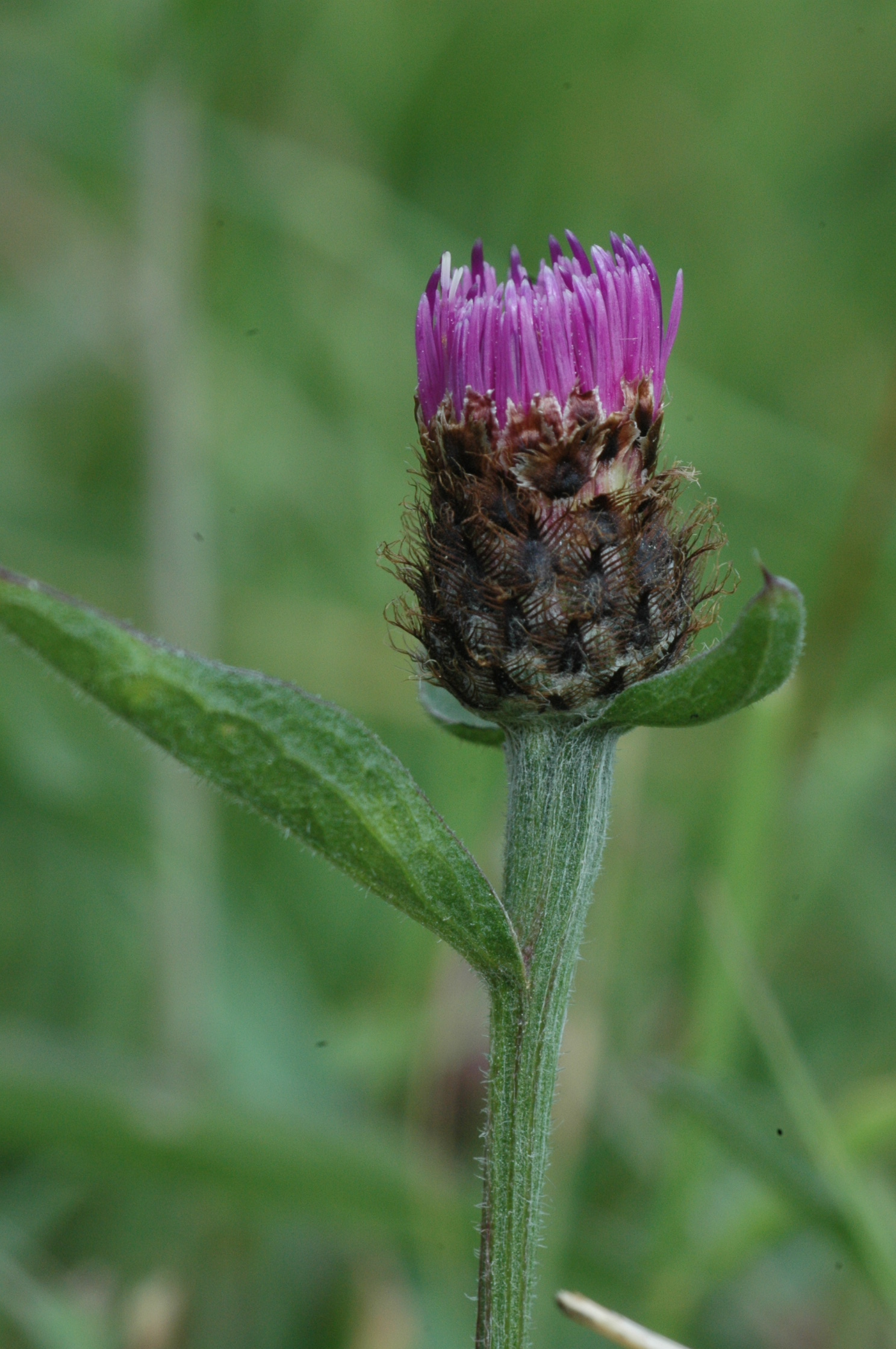
Common knapweed (C. nigra), perhaps the single most abundant Centaurea species of England

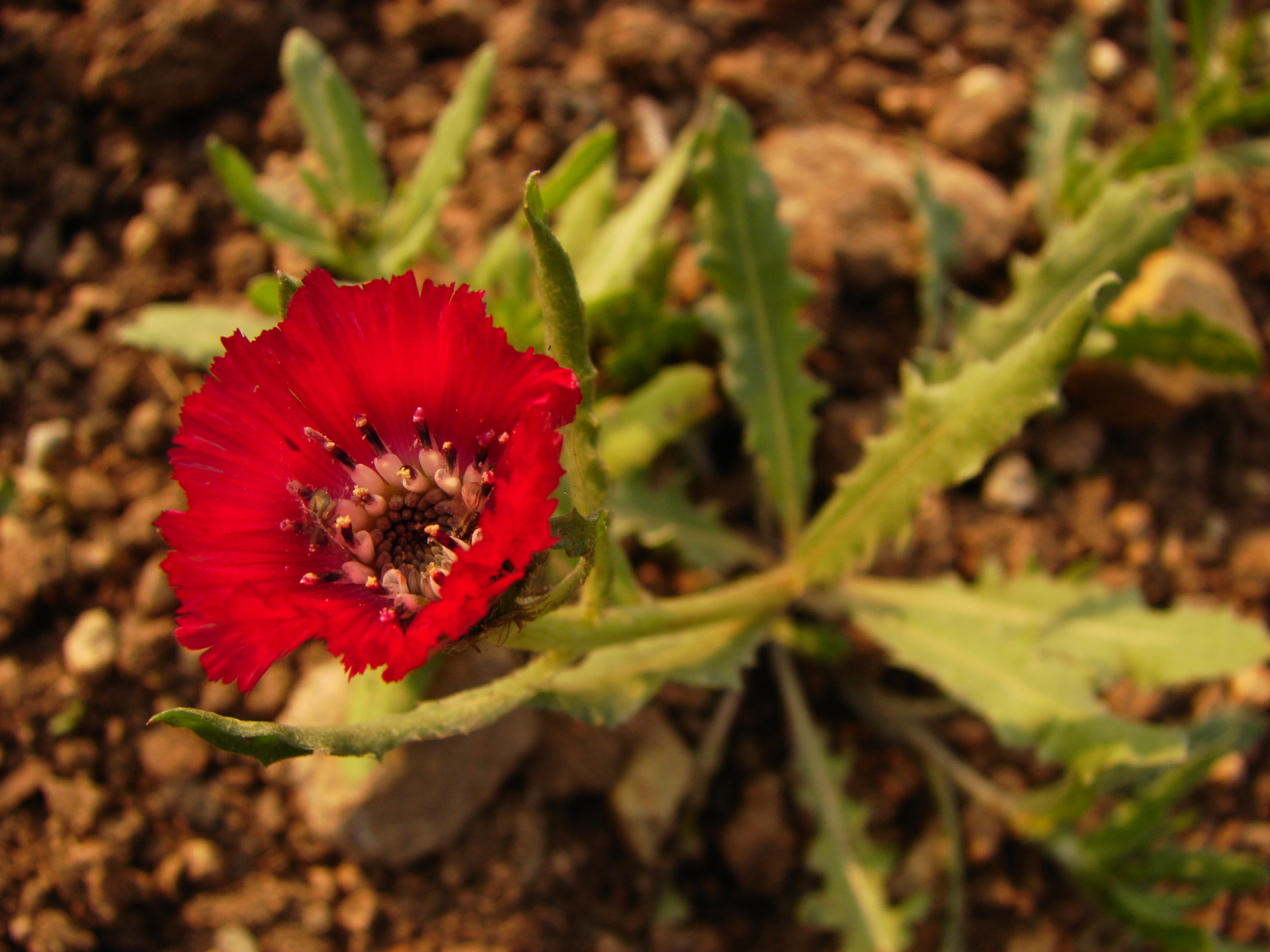
Centaurea tchihatcheffii (locally known as Yanardöner), a highly distinctive and rare knapweed endemic to Turkey

== Ecology ==
Certain knapweeds have a tendency to dominate large stretches of landscape together with a few other plants, typically one or two grasses and as many other large herbaceous plants. The common knapweed (C. nigra) for example is plentiful in the mesotrophic grasslands of England and nearby regions. It is most prominently found in pastures or meadows dominated by cock's-foot (Dactylis glomerata) as well as either of crested dog's-tail (Cynosurus cristatus) and false oat-grass (Arrhenatherum elatius). It is also often found in mesotrophic grassland on rendzinas and similar calcareous soils in association with glaucous sedge (Carex flacca), sheep's fescue (Festuca ovina), and either tor-grass (Brachypodium pinnatum) and rough hawkbit (Leontodon hispidus), or upright brome (Bromus erectus). In these grasslands, greater knapweed (C. scabiosa) is found much more rarely by comparison, often in association with red fescue (Festuca rubra) in addition to cock's-foot and false oat-grass.

Due to their habit of dominating ecosystems under good conditions, many Centaurea species can become invasive weeds in regions where they are not native. In parts of North America, diffuse knapweed (C. diffusa), spotted knapweed (C. maculosa) and yellow starthistle (C. solstitialis) cause severe problems in agriculture due to their uncontrolled spread. The seeds are typically transported by human traffic, in particular the tires of all-terrain vehicles. The two knapweeds are harmful mainly because they are strongly allelopathic, producing powerful toxins in their roots that stunt the growth of plants around them not adapted to this. Yellow starthistle, meanwhile, is inedible to most livestock due to its spines and apparently outright poisonous to horses and other equines. However, efficient methods of biological control by insect pests of these weeds have been developed; the knapweeds can also exploited to their detriment by targeted grazing. Controlled burning may also be used, though the timing is important to avoid the plants having seeded already, and neither allowing sufficient time for them to regrow from the rootstock.

Yet other species of Centaurea – mostly ones that occur between Italy and the Caucasus – are endemics of a single island or valley, and some of these are endangered. The Akamas Centaurea (Centaurea akamantis) of Cyprus is almost extinct, while the western Caucasus endemics C. leptophylla and C. straminicephala are at least very rare and C. hedgei and C. pecho from the same region are certainly not abundant either. The last four species would be adversely affected by the proposed Yusufeli Dam, which might actually destroy enough habitat to push the two rarer ones over the brink of extinction.

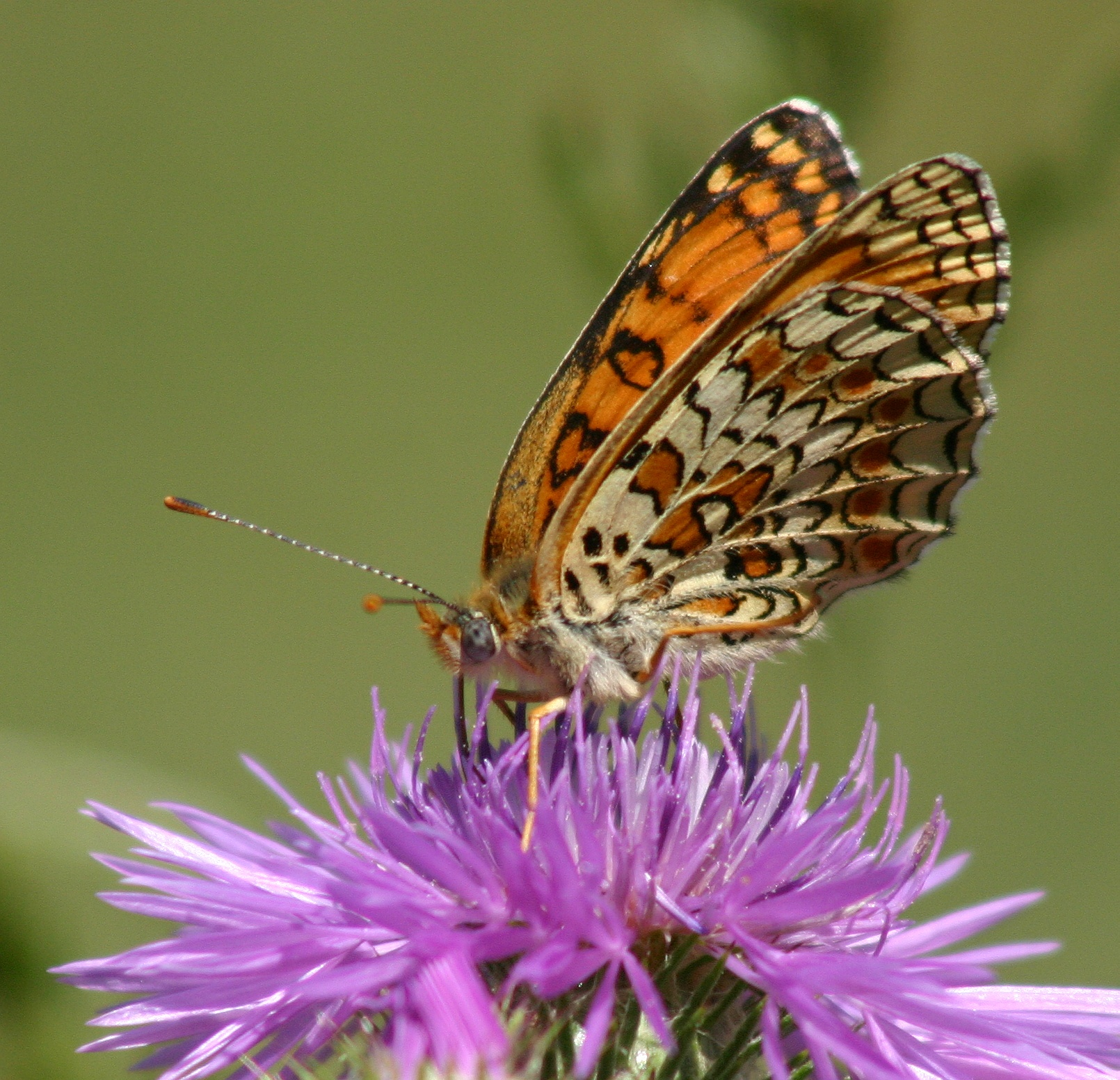
Knapweed fritillary (Melitaea phoebe). This butterfly can spend their entire lives living off a patch of brown knapweed (C. jacea).

Centaurea are copious nectar producers, especially on high-lime soils. The high nectar yield of the genus makes it very attractive to insects such as butterflies – including the endangered Karner blue (Plebejus melissa samuelis) which visits introduced spotted knapweed – and day-flying moths – typically Zygaenidae, such as Zygaena loti or the six-spot burnet (Z. filipendulae). The larvae of some other Lepidoptera species use Centaurea species as food plants; see List of Lepidoptera that feed on Centaurea. Several of these are used in biological control of invasive knapweeds and starthistles.

Larvae of several true weevils (Curculionidae) of the subfamily Lixinae also feed on Centaurea. Some genera – such as Larinus whose larval food is flowerheads – have many species especially adapted to particular knapweeds or starthistle and are used in biological control too. These include the yellow starthistle flower weevil (L. curtus) for yellow starthistle, lesser knapweed flower weevil (L. minutus) for diffuse knapweed and blunt knapweed flower weevil (L. obtusus) for spotted knapweed. Broad-nosed seedhead weevil (Bangasternus fausti) larvae eat diffuse, spotted and squarrose knapweed (C. virgata ssp. squarrosa), while those of the yellow starthistle bud weevil (B. orientalis) do not seem to live on anything other than yellow starthistle and occasionally purple starthistle (C. calcitrapa). But perhaps most efficient in destroying developing yellow starthistle seedheads is the larva of the yellow starthistle hairy weevil (Eustenopus villosus). Knapweed root weevil (Cyphocleonus achates) larvae bore into the roots of spotted and to a lesser extentely diffuse knapweed, sometimes killing off the entire plant.

Also used in biological control are Tephritidae (peacock flies) whose larvae feed on Centaurea. Knapweed peacock fly (Chaetorellia acrolophi) larvae eat spotted knapweed and some other species. The yellow starthistle peacock fly (C. australis) has an initial generation each year which often uses cornflower (C. cyanus) as larval food; later generations switch to yellow starthistle. The flies are generally considered less efficient in destroying the growing seedheads than the weevils, but may be superior under certain conditions; employing flies and weevils in combination is expensive and does not noticeably increase their effect.

== Use by humans ==
Despite the negative agricultural and environmental impacts of the more aggressive Centaurea species, there are many ways in which they benefit humans as well. For instance, due to their moderate to high nectar production, which can occur over a comparatively long duration, many species of Centaurea are popular food sources for insects that may otherwise attack certain crops. It may be advisable for some types of farms to allow certain Centaurea species, such as cornflower (C. cyanus) in a European setting, to grow adjacent to fields. These areas are known as beetle banks, though they support and attract a diversity of beneficial life beyond beetles. When certain Centaurea species are present, some pests may be drawn away from crops, and predatory insects and arachnids that feed upon pest insects will be better-supported by these more naturalized areas. They additionally have the beneficial aspect of supporting pollinators, unlike many field crops such as maize. Moreover, being untreated with pesticides and providing more diversity, plants growing in more wild areas adjacent to farms produce more insects that attract and support birds which can also feed on pests that would harm crops. Insect production is especially high for beetle banks that have enough plants that serve in the role of host plant for immature insects, rather than just in the roles of adult food and/or shelter provision.

Some plants which are considered invasive or problematic in certain areas can have beneficial qualities that outweigh their negative qualities from a human and/or human agricultural point of view, although this sometimes requires some human management – particularly if adequate biological control has not been established for the more aggressive species. An example is wild parsnip, Pastinaca sativa, which produces florets that feed predatory (and other beneficial) insects as well as large tubular stems that provide winter shelter for native bees, wasps, and other organisms that can be beneficial for agriculture. The plant is considered invasive in some areas of the United States and is also often considered undesirable due to its ability to cause contact skin irritation. However, it also serves as a host plant for the black swallowtail butterfly, helps to bring nutrients up from soils with its deep taproot, and possesses evergreen foliage even in climate zones such as US zone 6. This foliage increases soil warmth and moisture which can be beneficial for certain types of life. Perhaps the most dramatic example of a generally disliked plant's beneficial qualities being usually overlooked is the often-despised ragwort, Jacobaea vulgaris, which topped the list by a large amount for nectar production in a UK study, with a production per floral unit of (2921 ± 448μg). This very high nectar production, coupled with its early blooming period, makes the plant helpful for the establishment of bee colonies in spring — a period that is often not well-served by commercial flower meadow seed mixes. It also has the situationally-beneficial quality of being a spring ephemeral, as well as an annual that lacks difficult-to-combat roots. Plants that provide necessary structural supports for invertebrate and small vertebrate predators can help to keep overall pest populations low.

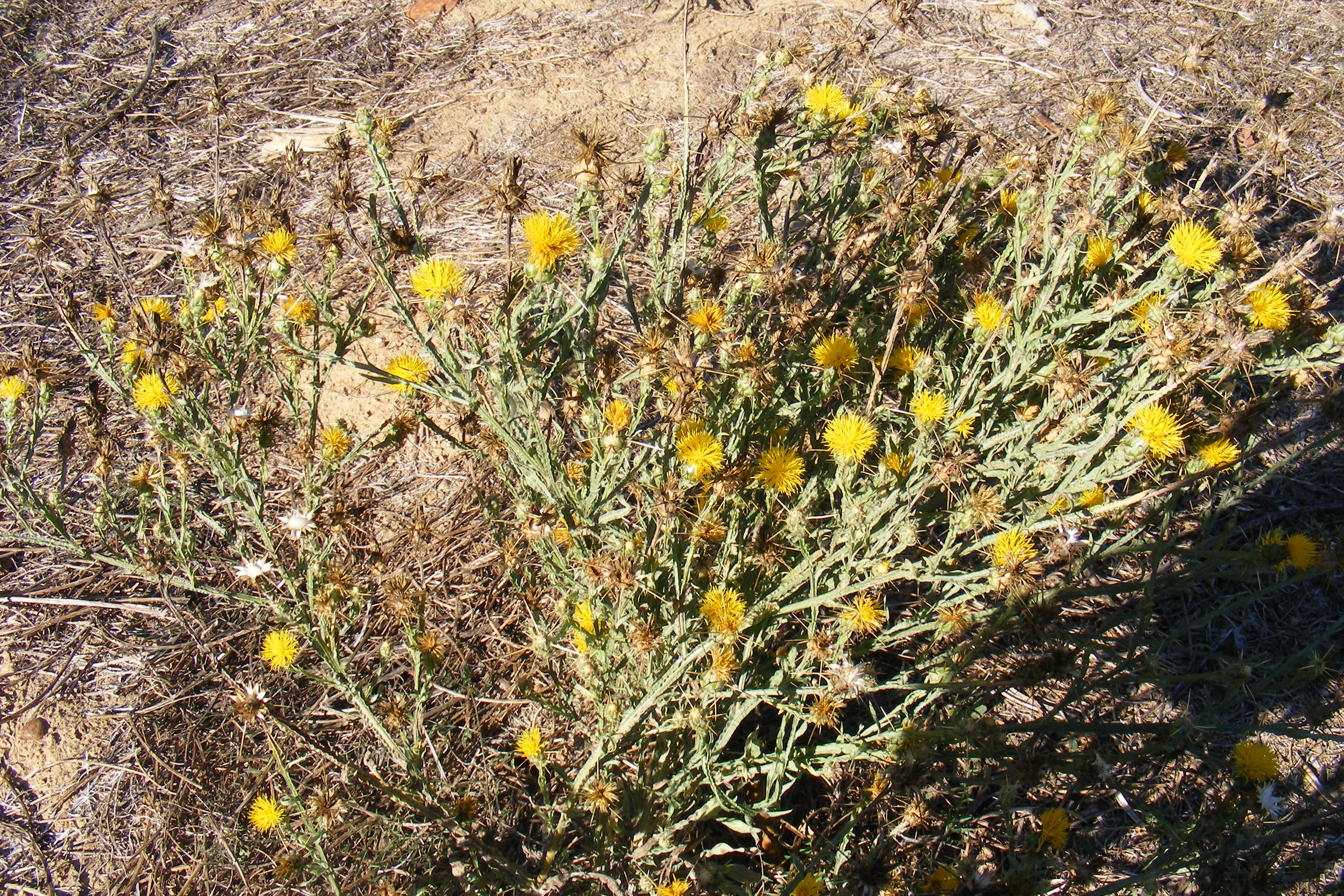
Yellow starthistle (C. solstitialis), an invasive weed that yields a fine honey

The abundant nectar produced by C. solstitialis flowers attracts many pollinators. This is another reason for the success of the (situationally) highly invasive species. Due to genetic differences related to evolutionary adaption, not all members of Centaurea produce the same amount of nectar. Growing conditions, such as climate and soil, can have a very strong impact, even if the plants grow and flower. For instance, cornflower plants, Centaurea cyanus, produced 33% less seasonal nectar than Centaurea nigra in a UK study. C. nigra also ranked higher than ragwort in another UK study, although ragwort was still in the top 10 for yearly nectar production. The strong nectar production of certain members of the genus can be exploited to the farmer's advantage, possibly in combination with biological control. In particular, the yellow starthistle (C. solstitialis) as well as spotted knapweed (C. maculosa) are major honey plants for beekeepers. Monofloral honey from these plants is light and slightly tangy, and one of the finest honeys produced in the United States – due to its better availability, it is even fraudulently relabeled and sold as the scarce and expensive sourwood honey of the Appalachian Mountains. Placing beehives near stands of Centaurea will cause increased pollination. As most seedheads fail however when biocontrol pests have established themselves, the plants will bloom ever more abundantly in an attempt to replace the destroyed seedheads, to the point where they exhaust their resources in providing food for the pests (seeds), bees (pollen) and humans (honey). Output of allelopathic compounds is also liable to be reduced under such conditions – the plant has to compromise between allocating energy to reproduction and defense. This renders the weeds more likely to be suppressed by native vegetation or crops in the following years, especially if properly timed controlled burning and/or targeted grazing by suitable livestock are also employed. While yellow starthistle and perhaps other species are toxic to equines, some other livestock may eat the non-spiny knapweeds with relish. In Europe, common knapweed (C. nigra) and globe knapweed (C. macrocephala) are locally important pollen sources for honeybees in mid-late summer.

8-Hydroxyquinoline has been identified as a main allelopathic compound produced by diffuse knapweed (C. diffusa); native North American plants are typically sensitive to it, while those of Eastern Europe and Asia Minor usually have coevolved with the knapweed and are little harmed if at all, aided by native microorganisms that break down or even feed on the abundantly secreted compound. Thus, 8-hydroxyquinoline is potentially useful to control American plants that have become invasive weeds in the diffuse knapweed's native range.

Arctiin from C. imperialis kills cancer cells in culture

Arctiin, found in C. imperialis, has shown anticancer activity in laboratory studies. The roots of the long-lost C. foliosa, an endemic of Hatay Province (Turkey), are used in folk medicine, and other species are presumably too. A South Italian variety of the purple starthistle (C. calcitrapa) is traditionally consumed by ethnic Albanians (Arbëreshë people) in the Vulture area (southern Italy); e.g. in the Arbëreshë communities in Lucania the young whorls of C. calcitrapa are boiled and fried in mixtures with other weedy non-cultivated greens. According to research by the Michael Heinrich group at the Centre for Pharmacognosy and Phytotherapy (School of Pharmacy, University of London) "the antioxidant activity [...] of the young whorls of Centaurea calcitrapa, both in the DPPH and in the lipid peroxidation inhibition assays, [is] very interesting and [the] species should be investigated phytochemically and biochemically focusing on these properties". Extracts from C. calcitrapa were furthermore found to have significant xanthine oxidase (XO)-inhibiting activity.

Spotted knapweed as well as other species are rich in cnicin, a bitter compound found mainly in the leaves and often used to flavor the digestif amaro. In western Crete, Greece a local variety of C. calcitrapa called gourounaki (γουρουνάκι "little pig") also has its leaves eaten boiled by the locals. In the same island an endemic local species, C. idaea called katsoula (κατσούλα), tsita (τσίτα) or aspragatha (ασπραγκάθα), has its leaves eaten boiled by the locals too.

Cornflower blue
#6495ED

Some species are cultivated as ornamental plants in gardens. As regards other aspects of popular culture, cornflower (C. cyanus) is the floral emblem of Östergötland province (Sweden) – where is it called blåklint, literally "blue mountain" – and of Päijät-Häme region in Finland, where it is known as ruiskaunokki ("rye-beaks") or ruiskukka ("rye-flower"). It is also the national flower of Estonia where its local name rukkilill means "rye-lily", Belarus where it is called vałoška (Belarusian: валошка), and one of those of Germany where it is called Kornblume ("cornflower"). The origin of the name "caltrop" for the ancient low-tech area denial weapon is probably in some way connected with C. calcitrapa and its spiny seeds. This plant is attested to by the colloquial name "caltrop" at a time when the weapons were still called by their Roman name tribulus. Lastly, the color cornflower blue is named after C. cyanus. Cornflower is also used as a cut flower.

== Systematics and taxonomy ==
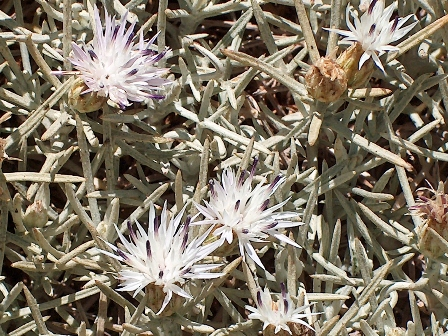
Centaurea horrida

As namesake member of the subtribe Centaureinae of tribe Cardueae, the knapweeds are probably most closely related to genera such as Carthamus (distaff thistles), Cnicus (blessed thistle), Crupina (crupinas) or Notobasis (Syrian thistle), and somewhat less closely to most other thistles. The monotypic Cnicus seems in fact to properly belong in Centaurea.

Research in the late 20th century shows that Centaurea as traditionally defined is polyphyletic. A number of 19th- and 20th-century efforts to reorganize the genus were not successful, and it is not yet clear what the consequences of the recent research will be for classification of this genus and other related genera. The type species C. centaurium stands somewhat apart from the main lineage of knapweeds and thus the taxonomic consequences of a rearrangement might be severe, with hundreds of species needing to be moved to new genera. It has thus been proposed to change the type species to one of the main lineages to avoid this problem. What seems certain however is that the basketflowers – presently treated as a section Plectocephalus – will be reinstated as a distinct genus in the near future. The rock-centauries (Cheirolophus), formerly usually included in Centaurea, are now already treated as separate genus.

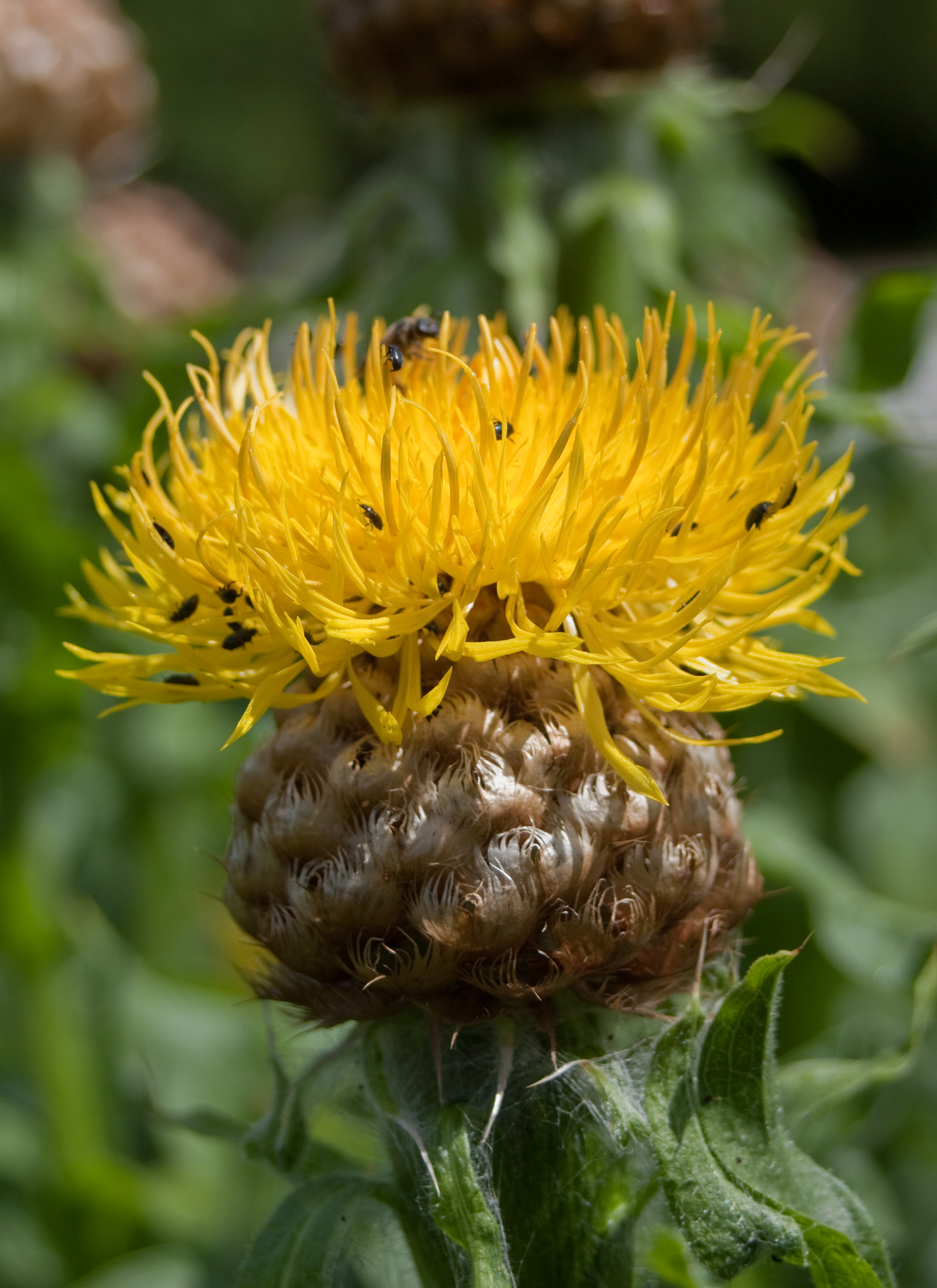
Globe knapweed (C. macrocephala)

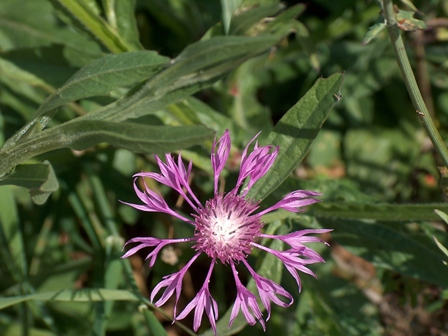
Centaurea napifolia

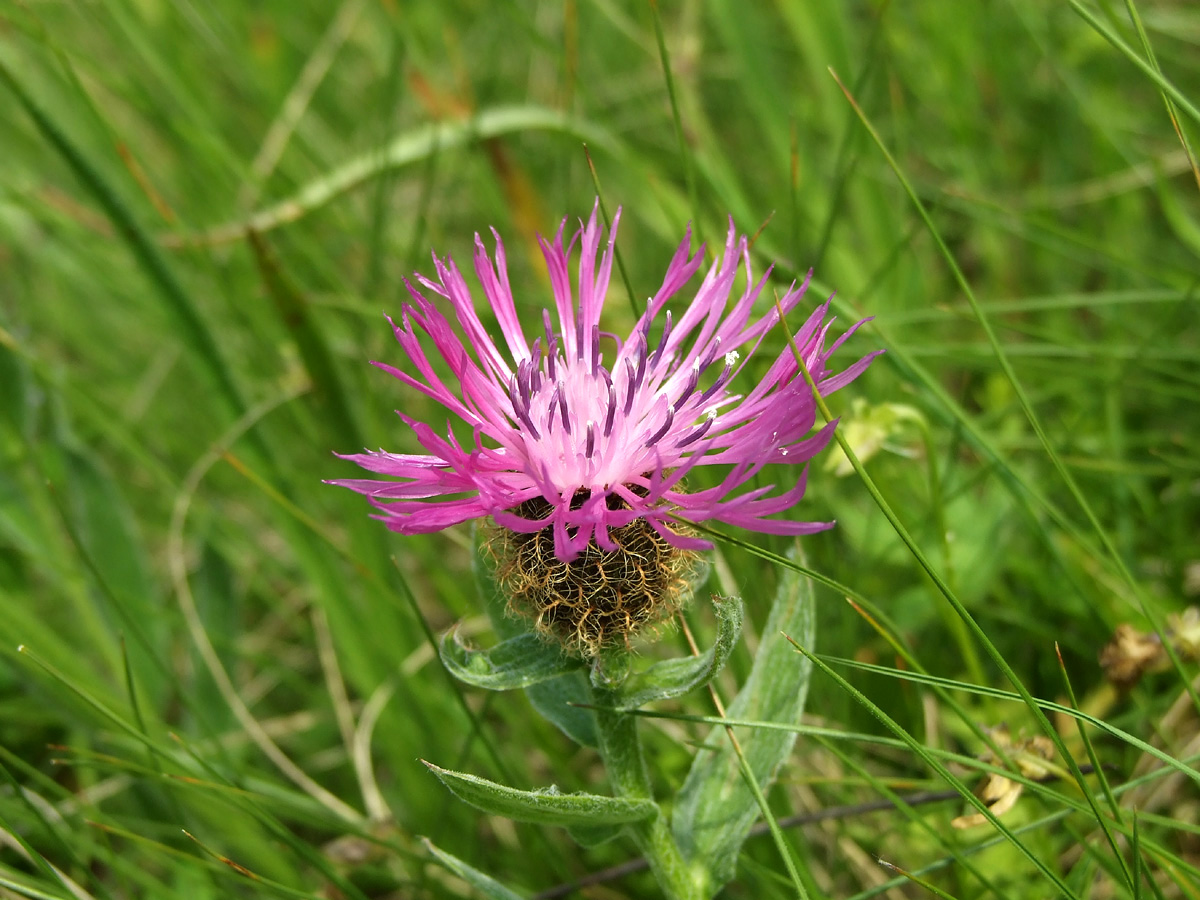
Centaurea nervosa

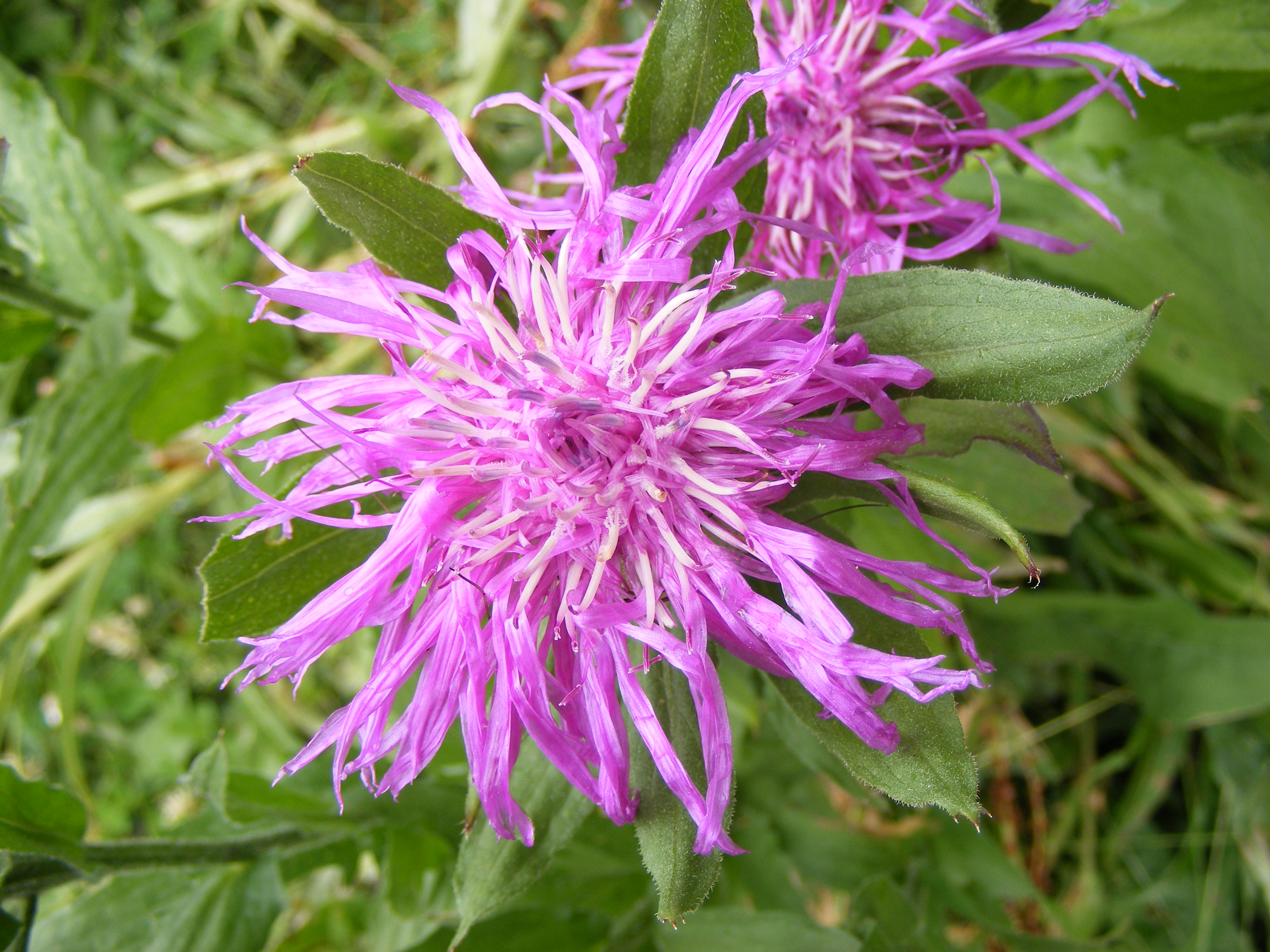
Centaurea pseudophrygia

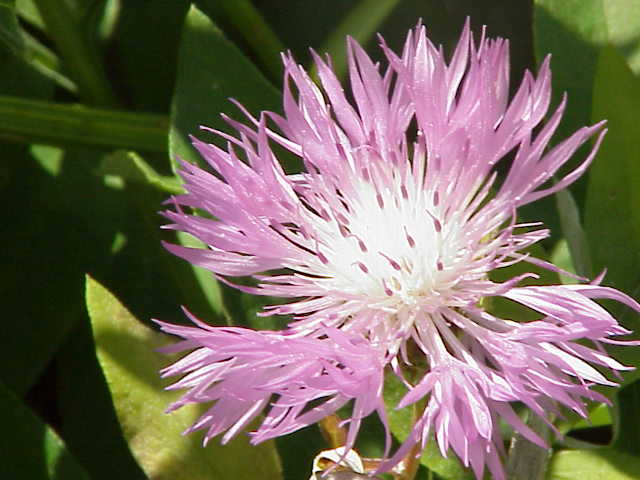
Centaurea pulcherrima

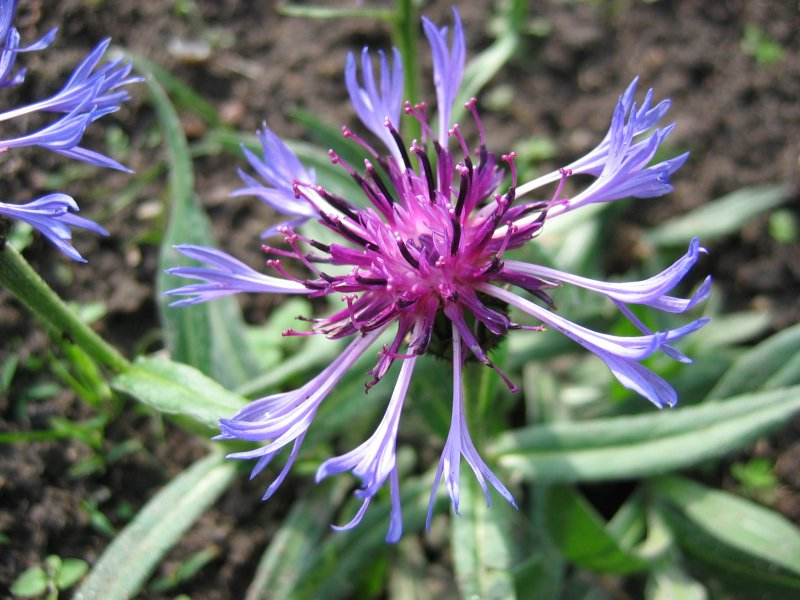
Centaurea triumfettii

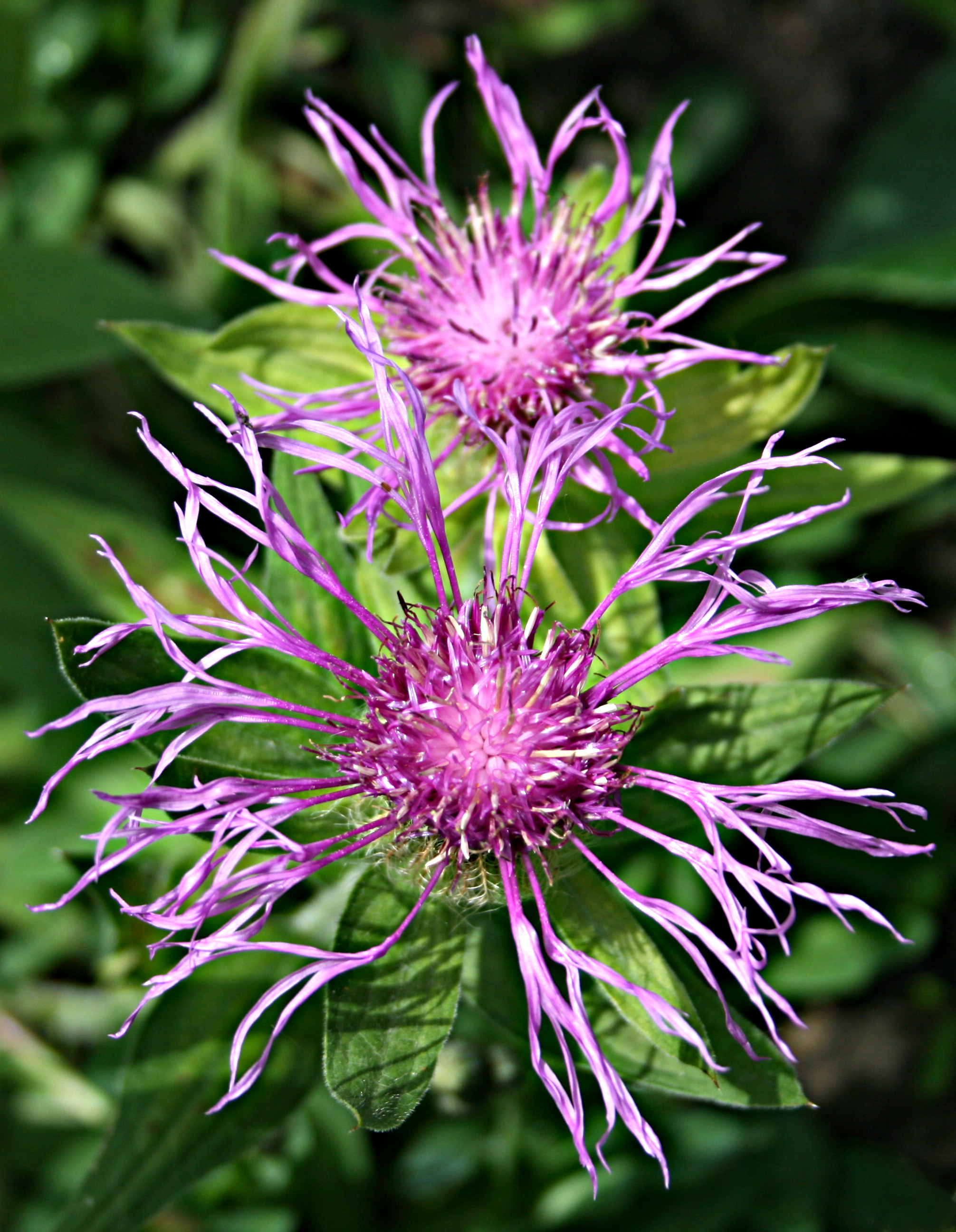
Centaurea uniflora

== Species ==
Better-known Centaurea species include:

- Centaurea acaulis
- Centaurea adpressa
- Centaurea aegyptiaca
- Centaurea aeolica
- Centaurea aggregata
- Centaurea akamantis – Akamas centaurea
- Centaurea alba
- Centaurea albonitens Turrill
- Centaurea alpestris
- Centaurea alpina
- Centaurea ambigua
- Centaurea amblyolepis
- Centaurea americana – American basketflower, American starthistle
- Centaurea ammocyanus
- Centaurea antennata Dufour
- Centaurea antiochia Boiss.
- Centaurea aplolepa
  - Centaurea aplolepa subsp. carueliana
- Centaurea appendicigera C.Koch
- Centaurea argentea
- Centaurea ascalonica
- Centaurea aspera L. – rough starthistle
- Centaurea atacamensis (Reiche) I.M.Johnst.
- Centaurea atropurpurea
- Centaurea ×aurata
- Centaurea babylonica L.
- Centaurea balsamita
- Centaurea behen L. – ak behmen (Turkish)
- Centaurea bella
- Centaurea benedicta – Cnicus
- Centaurea bieberseinii
- Centaurea borjae
- Centaurea bovina
- Centaurea bracteata
- Centaurea brevifimbriata Hub.-Mor.
- Centaurea bulbosa
- Centaurea busambarensis Guss.
- Centaurea cachinalensis
- Centaurea calcitrapa – purple starthistle, red starthistle, "caltrop"
- Centaurea calcitrapoides
- Centaurea cariensis Boiss.
- Centaurea cariensiformis Hub.-Mor.
- Centaurea caroli-henrici Gabrieljan & Dittrich
- Centaurea centaurium L.
- Centaurea chilensis
- Centaurea cineraria – velvet centaurea, dusty miller
- Centaurea clementei
- Centaurea collina L.
- Centaurea corymbosa
- Centaurea crithmifolia
- Centaurea crocodylium
- Centaurea cyanoides J.Berggr. & Wahlenb.
- Centaurea cyanus – cornflower, bachelor's button, boutonniere flower, hurtsickle, bluebottle, basketflower
- Centaurea damascena
- Centaurea debeauxii Gren. & Godr.
- Centaurea demirizii Wagenitz
- Centaurea depressa – low cornflower
- Centaurea deusta
- Centaurea diffusa – diffuse knapweed, white knapweed, tumble knapweed
- Centaurea diluta – North African knapweed
- Centaurea drabifolia Sm.
- Centaurea drabifolioides Hub.-Mor.
- Centaurea dschungarica
- Centaurea emilae Hüseynova et Qaraxani
- Centaurea eriophora
- Centaurea eryngioides
- Centaurea filiformis
- Centaurea fischeri Willd.
- Centaurea floccosa
- Centaurea foliosa Boiss. & Kotschy
- Centaurea forojuliensis
- Centaurea friderici Vis. – palagruška zečina (Croatian)
- Centaurea gayana
- Centaurea gigantea
- Centaurea glaberrima Tausch
- Centaurea glastifolia
- Centaurea grinensis
- Centaurea gymnocarpa
- Centaurea haradjianii Wagenitz
- Centaurea hedgei
- Centaurea helenioides Boiss.
- Centaurea hermannii F.Hermann
- Centaurea horrida Badarò – fiordaliso spinoso (Italian)
- Centaurea hyalolepis
- Centaurea hypoleuca
- Centaurea iberica – Iberian starthistle, Iberian knapweed
- Centaurea idaea – katsoula, tsita (Cretan Greek)
- Centaurea imperialis Hausskn. ex Bornm.
- Centaurea jabukensis
- Centaurea jacea – brown knapweed, brownray knapweed
- Centaurea kasakorum
- Centaurea kopetaghensis
- Centaurea kotschyana Heuff.
- Centaurea lanulata
- Centaurea leptophylla
- Centaurea leucophylla
- Centaurea limbata
- Centaurea lydia Boiss.
- Centaurea macrocephala Puschk. ex Willd. – globe knapweed, Armenian basketflower
- Centaurea maculosa – spotted knapweed (might belong in C. stoebe subsp. micranthos)
- Centaurea mannagettae
- Centaurea margaritalba Klok.
- Centaurea marschalliana
- Centaurea melitensis – Maltese starthistle; tocalote, tocolote (California)
- Centaurea minor
- Centaurea moschata – sweet sultan
- Centaurea ×moncktonii C.E.Britton – meadow knapweed, protean knapweed (= C. ×pratensis Thuill non Salisb.)
- Centaurea monocephala
- Centaurea montana – montane knapweed, perennial cornflower, mountain cornflower, mountain bluet
- Centaurea napifolia L. – fiordaliso romano (Italian)
- Centaurea nervosa Rchb. ex Steud.
- Centaurea nigra – common knapweed, black knapweed, lesser knapweed, hardheads
- Centaurea nigrescens – Tyrol knapweed, short-fringed knapweed, Tyrol thistle
- Centaurea nigrifimbria (C.Koch) Sosn.
- Centaurea nivea (Bornm.) Wagenitz
- Centaurea onopordifolia
- Centaurea orientalis L.
- Centaurea ornata Willd.
- Centaurea ovina
- Centaurea pallescens Delile
- Centaurea paniculata L.
- Centaurea parlatoris
- Centaurea pecho
- Centaurea phrygia – wig knapweed
- Centaurea pindicola
- Centaurea polypodiifolia
- Centaurea ×pratensis Salisb. (C. jacea × C. nigra) – meadow knapweed
- Centaurea procurrens
- Centaurea ×psammogena G.Gayer. (C. diffusa × C. stoebe subsp. micranthos)
- Centaurea pseudocaerulescens
- Centaurea pseudophrygia C.A.Mey.
- Centaurea pulcherrima Willd.
- Centaurea pullata L.
- Centaurea pumilio
- Centaurea ragusina L.
- Centaurea rigida
- Centaurea rothrockii Greenm. – Mexican basketflower, Rothrock's basketflower, Rothrock's knapweed
- Centaurea ruthenica
- Centaurea rutifolia Sm.
- Centaurea sadleriana – Pannonian knapweed
- Centaurea salicifolia Bieb. ex Willd.
- Centaurea scabiosa – greater knapweed
- Centaurea scannensis
- Centaurea scoparia
- Centaurea scopulorum Boiss. & Heldr.
- Centaurea seguenzae
- Centaurea seridis L.
- Centaurea sibirica
- Centaurea simplicicaulis
- Centaurea sinaica
- Centaurea solstitialis – yellow starthistle, golden starthistle, yellow cockspur, St. Barnaby's thistle, Barnaby thistle
- Centaurea speciosa
- Centaurea sphaerocephala L.
- Centaurea stenolepis
- Centaurea stoebe L.
  - Centaurea stoebe subsp. micranthos (Gugler) Hayek
- Centaurea straminicephala
- Centaurea sulphurea – Sicilian starthistle
- Centaurea tauromenitana Guss.
- Centaurea tenoreana
- Centaurea tommasinii
- Centaurea transalpina Schleich. ex DC.
- Centaurea tchihatcheffii — yanardöner (Turkish)
- Centaurea trichocephala Bieb. ex Willd. – featherhead knapweed
- Centaurea triniifolia
- Centaurea triumfettii All.
- Centaurea tymphaea Hausskn.
- Centaurea ucriae Lacaita
- Centaurea uniflora Turra
- Centaurea verbascifolia Vahl
- Centaurea verutum L.
- Centaurea virgata
  - Centaurea virgata subsp. squarrosa – squarrose knapweed
- Centaurea wiedemanniana Fisch. & Mey.
- Centaurea yozgatensis Wagenitz

=== Formerly placed here ===
Plant species formerly placed in Centaurea include:

- Acroptilon repens – Russian knapweed (as Centaurea repens)
- Cheirolophus crassifolius – Maltese rock-centaury (as Centaurea crassifolia, C. spathulata)
- Femeniasia balearica (as Centaurea balearica)
- Volutaria muricata (as Centaurea muricata)
