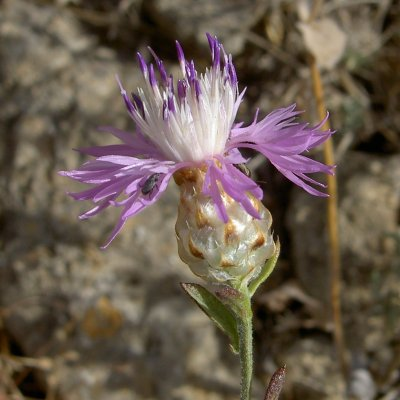

Scientific classification
- Kingdom: Plantae
- Clade: Tracheophytes
- Clade: Angiosperms
- Clade: Eudicots
- Clade: Asterids
- Order: Asterales
- Family: Asteraceae
- Genus: Centaurea
- Species: C. alba

Binomial name
- Centaurea alba L.

= Centaurea alba =

Species of flowering plant

Centaurea alba is a species of Centaurea found in the Iberian Peninsula in southern and central Spain and in a small neighbouring area in the interior of Portugal. There are three recognised subspecies, and of one subspecies, the nominate, there are furthermore three varieties.

It has been called pale knapweed in English. Vernacular names which have been recorded for this herb in Castilian Spanish are calcitrapa, cardo estrellado, centaura estrellada, garbanzos del cura, siempre nueva, siempre-nueva, and trapacaballos. Other local recorded names in Spanish are abreojos, abrepuños, amargosa, amargosilla, amargoso, ardolla, arzolla, cardo abrepuños, cardo de la arzolla, marbosilla, margosilla, piropo, planta para hemorroides and raíz de la arzolla. In the Catalan language it is known as raspallera in the Valencian dialect.

== Taxonomy ==
The species was first described in the modern Linnaean system by Linnaeus himself in the first edition of the Species Plantarum, published in 1753. It is presently placed in Augustin Pyramus de Candolle's section or subsection Phalolepis, along with Centaurea costae and the much more widely distributed C. deusta. In 2014 Hilpold et al. redefined the infrageneric taxa, classifying the traditional section Phalolepis in the subgenus Centaurea. Formerly the genus Centaurea was paraphyletic, because it was based on a species, C. centaurium -the type species, which was less related to the vast majority of other Centaurea than to species which were classified as belonging to other genera. In 2001 Werner Greuter solved this by moving the C. centaurium to the old, resurrected genus Rhaponticoides, conserving the name Centaurea for the majority of the other species, and electing C. paniculata to serve as the new type species.

The infraspecific taxonomy has been rather volatile since the 1970s. A large number of former subspecies were recognised at one time or another. These were synonymised over the last century or so, or are now considered independent species.

- Centaurea alba subsp. albanica (Halácsy) Dostál - a taxon from Albania.
- Centaurea alba subsp. brunnea (Halácsy) Dostál
- Centaurea alba subsp. ciliata (Font Quer ex O.Bolòs & Vigo) Greuter
- Centaurea alba subsp. costae (Willk.) Dostál
- Centaurea alba subsp. formanekii (Halácsy) Dostál
- Centaurea alba subsp. latronum (Pau) Dostál
- Centaurea alba subsp. macrocephala (Pau) Talavera
- Centaurea alba subsp. maluqueri (Font Quer) Molero & Vigo
- Centaurea alba subsp. montsicciana (Pau & Font Quer) Romo
- Centaurea alba subsp. strepens (Hoffmanns. & Link) Rocha Afonso
- Centaurea alba subsp. subciliaris (Boiss. & Heldr.) Dostál
- Centaurea alba subsp. tartesiana Talavera

In his 1976 contribution in the Flora Europaea, Josef Dostál recognised subsp. albanica, subsp. brunnea, subsp. costae, subsp. deusta, subsp. formanekii, subsp. latronum and subsp. subciliaris.

A lectotype was assigned by Salvador Talavera Lozano in 1984.

The 2006 entry by Greuter in the Euro+Med Plantbase, based on a critical evaluation of the information from the Flora Europaea and the Med-Checklist, recognised the following infraspecific taxa:

- Centaurea alba subsp. ciliata (O. Bolòs & Vigo) Greuter
- Centaurea alba subsp. costae (Willk.) Dostál
- Centaurea alba subsp. latronum (Pau) Dostál
- Centaurea alba subsp. macrocephala (Pau) Talavera
- Centaurea alba subsp. maluqueri (Font Quer) Molero & Vigo
- Centaurea alba subsp. montsicciana (Pau & Font Quer) Romo
- Centaurea alba subsp. strepens (Hoffmanns. & Link) Rocha Afonso
- Centaurea alba subsp. tartesiana Talavera

In 2008 the chromosomes of the different infraspecific taxa were investigated (karyotypy). All forms are 2n=18, but some differences between the taxa is seen in the chromosome morphology. The species was revised again in 2011. The 2014 entry in the Flora Ibérica follows this interpretation, although it only briefly mentions the three varieties.

- Centaurea alba subsp. alba var. alba
- Centaurea alba subsp. alba var. latronum (Pau) E.López & Devesa
- Centaurea alba subsp. alba var. macrocephala Pau
- Centaurea alba subsp. aristifera (Pau ex Vicioso) E.López & Devesa
- Centaurea alba subsp. tartesiana Talavera

The name C. deusta, a species more widely distributed in southern Italy, Greece and Turkey, has also historically been mistakenly said to occur in Spain, for example by Augustin Pyramus de Candolle in 1838 in the Prodromus, in the 1865 issue of the Prodromus Florae Hispanicae of Heinrich Moritz Willkomm and Johan Lange, or by Carl Fredrik Nyman in his Conspectus Florae Europaeae (1878-1884). Dostál subsumed C. deusta in the Flora Europaea as C. alba subsp. deusta, and this taxon continued to be recognised as occurring in Spain in the 2001 entry in the Atlas de la flora del Pirineo Aragonés.

=== Hybrids ===
All of the species in the subgenus Centaurea appear to be able to hybridise freely with each other, and C. alba is no exception. In some, but not all, of the zones where the following taxa are in contact with C. alba, the following natural hybrids have been described as occurring. A cross of the nominate form with C. langei subsp. kheilii creates the hybrid C. ×bigerrensis, and with C. aristata, C. ×matritensis is created. The variety latronum is also known to cross with C. calcitra, creating C. ×eliasii, recognisable by having its involucral bracts being tipped by a large and sharp spine. Another hybrid of the species has also recently (2009) been described from a 1988 collection in an industrial zone in the Province of Soria: Centaurea ×soriana A.Segura ex Mateo & M.B.Crespo. The other parent of the hybrid is C. paniculata subsp. castellana. Lastly, in the Province of Soria relatively frequently transitional forms between the nominate variety alba with C. alba subsp. aristifera can be encountered.

== Description ==
It is most similar to Centaurea costae, being mainly distinguished by the shape of the involucral bracts. C. costae has bilobed bracts.

- Centaurea alba subsp. alba -
- Centaurea alba subsp. aristifera -
- Centaurea alba subsp. tartesiana -

== Distribution ==
It only occurs on the Iberian Peninsula, being found at generally inland sites in central, central-north, central-western y southwestern parts of the Peninsula. In Spain it is found in the provinces of Ávila, Badajoz, Burgos, Cádiz, Cáceres, Ciudad Real, Cuenca, Guadalajara, Huelva, León, Madrid, Salamanca, Sevilla, Segovia, Soria, Toledo, Valladolid, Zaragoza and Zamora. In Portugal it occurs in Beira Baixa and Ribatejo Province. The different subspecies and varieties now recognised are largely not sympatric and have discreet geographical distributions. Two taxa have disjunct distributions, subsp. tartesiana to the south of the main distribution, and var. macrocephala further to the south of that, at the southernmost tip of continental Spain.

For a long time it was believed to grow in northeast Algeria. According to López this was originally based on a single sheet of a specimen in the personal herbarium of Georges Rouy, collected in Segovia in 1905, but apparently accidentally included in the section Plantes d’Algérie of the herbarium. It is one of five duplicates, one of which is the lectotype of the subspecies alba synonym Centaurea segoviensis. However, C. alba var. mauritanica had already been described by Jules Aimé Battandier in his 1889 Flore de l'Algérie as growing in Algeria, and an Algerian population of Centaurea was called as C. alba in the local flora until the 2000s, for example in the 1963 Nouvelle flore d'Algérie, or the 1985 French collection on the Djebel Ich Ali near Tazoult in Batna wilaya. This population is now seen as a synonym of C. djebel-amouri, which was only recently described as a new species by Greuter in 2003; the previous name C. alba for the population is now attributed as "auct. Afr. N. non L.".

Plants from Italy, France and possibly Albania have also historically been misidentified as C. alba.

- Centaurea alba subsp. alba
  - C. alba subsp. alba var. alba -
  - C. alba subsp. alba var. latronum -
  - C. alba subsp. alba var. macrocephala - A disjunct population restricted to the southernmost tip of Spain, from the mouth of the Guadalquivir emptying in the Gulf of Cádiz northeastwards into the Baetic Depression, entirely within the Province of Cádiz.
- Centaurea alba subsp. aristifera -
- Centaurea alba subsp. tartesiana - An endemic of the northwest corner of Andalusia. It occurs in the western part of the Sierra Morena mountain range, in the provinces of Huelva and Sevilla.

== Ecology ==
It blooms from April to October. This species inhabits woodland clearings and the fringes of forests, especially pine forests, oak forests and melojares (Quercus pyrenaica forests), as well as growing in matorral, wasteland and gutters, slopes and wayside verge habitat along roads. It has been recorded growing at 3 to 2,000 metres in altitude. It prefers somewhat fertile soils, or not excessively fertilised, which can be acidic to alkaline. It is usually found growing in rocky, large-grained soil, very often calcareous mixed with silicates. The macrocephala variety occurs in matorral habitats on substrates derived from calcarenite and limestone. The tartesiana subspecies occurs in slate-based soils and marl.

== Conservation ==
In 1992 two subspecies, subsp. heldreichii and subsp. princeps, were designated as 'priority species' under Annex II of the Habitats Directive of the European Community (which was reformed as the European Union the following year). This designation was meant to serve as the basis for Spain to declare which areas in which it occurs were 'Special Areas of Conservation' -which were to form the backbone of the Natura 2000 network, but only if these areas include one of the number of habitats listed in Annex I of the directive. Neither subspecies are still recognised.

In 2005 the flora of Andalusia was assessed for the Lista roja de la flora vascular de Andalucía, with two subspecies, subsp. tartesiana and subsp. macrocephala, being included in the list. These two taxa were assessed as 'data deficient', but were included because they have restricted distributions and the authors thought that they might be threatened, or at least impacted, by changes in agriculture.
