= CSMU =

CSMU is the abbreviation, which may refer to:

- Crimea State Medical University named after S. I. Georgievsky - medical university in Simferopol, Ukraine
- Chung Shan Medical University - medical university in Taichung City, Taiwan
- Crash Survivable Memory Unit - a resilient storage medium used in military aircraft and flight data and cockpit voice recorders
