= Jordanita benderi =

Scientific classification
- Domain: Eukaryota
- Kingdom: Animalia
- Phylum: Arthropoda
- Class: Insecta
- Order: Lepidoptera
- Family: Zygaenidae
- Genus: Jordanita
- Species: J. benderi

Binomial name
- Jordanita benderi (Tarmann, 1985)

Synonyms
- Adscita benderi Tarmann, 1985

Species of moth

Jordanita benderi is a moth of the family Zygaenidae. It is found in the High Atlas in Morocco.

The length of the forewings is 11.6–14.6 mm for males and 9.2 mm for females. Adults are on wing from March to the beginning of May.

The larvae probably feed on Carthamus lanatus.
