= Jordanita anatolica =

Scientific classification
- Domain: Eukaryota
- Kingdom: Animalia
- Phylum: Arthropoda
- Class: Insecta
- Order: Lepidoptera
- Family: Zygaenidae
- Genus: Jordanita
- Species: J. anatolica

Binomial name
- Jordanita anatolica (Naufock, 1929)

Synonyms
- Procris anatolica Naufock, 1929

Species of moth

Jordanita anatolica is a moth of the family Zygaenidae. It is found in Nakhchivan, southern Turkey, Cyprus, Syria, Lebanon, Israel, Jordan, Egypt and north-eastern Libya. In the east, the range extends to Iraq and Iran.

The length of the forewings is 8.8–10.5 mm for males and 7.9–9.2 mm for females.

The larvae feed on Echinops spinosus. They mine the leaves of their host plant.

== Subspecies ==
- Jordanita anatolica anatolica
- Jordanita anatolica kruegeri (Turati, 1930) (Libya, Egypt)
