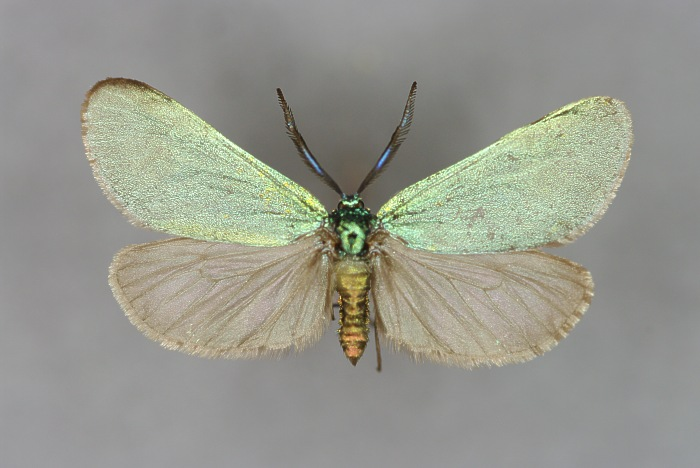

Scientific classification
- Domain: Eukaryota
- Kingdom: Animalia
- Phylum: Arthropoda
- Class: Insecta
- Order: Lepidoptera
- Family: Zygaenidae
- Genus: Jordanita
- Species: J. budensis

Binomial name
- Jordanita budensis (Speyer & Speyer, 1858)

Synonyms
- Ino budensis Ad. & Au. Speyer 1858; Procris budensis

= Jordanita budensis =

Species of moth

Jordanita budensis is a moth of the family Zygaenidae. It is found in disjunct populations in central Spain, southern France, Italy, eastern Austria, Hungary, the Balkan Peninsula, Greece, Ukraine, the Crimea, the European part of southern Russia, the Caucasus, Transcaucasia, Turkey, southern Siberia, Mongolia and the Amur region.

The length of the forewings is 12.5–15.5 mm for males and 8–11 mm for females. Adults are on wing during the day.

The larvae feed on Centaurea paniculata in western Europe, Centaurea triumfetti in central Europe and Achillea setacea on the Crimea. They mine the leaves of their host plant.
