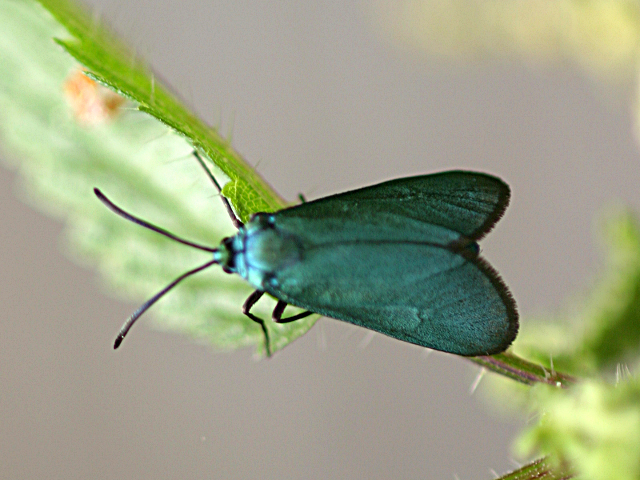

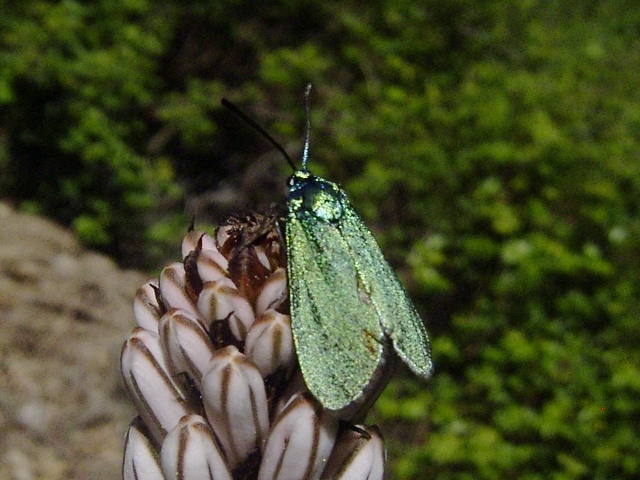

Scientific classification
- Kingdom: Animalia
- Phylum: Arthropoda
- Clade: Pancrustacea
- Class: Insecta
- Order: Lepidoptera
- Family: Zygaenidae
- Genus: Jordanita
- Species: J. globulariae

Binomial name
- Jordanita globulariae (Hübner, 1793)

Synonyms
- Adscita globulariae; Sphinx globulariae Hübner, 1793

= Jordanita globulariae =

Scarce forester

Species of moth

Jordanita globulariae, also known as the scarce forester, is a day-flying moth of the family Zygaenidae.

== Distribution ==
It is found from the western part of the Iberian Peninsula through western, central and eastern Europe to the Ural. In the south, the range extends through the Balkan Peninsula to north-western Turkey.

== Description ==
The length of the forewings is 10.5–17 mm for males and 7.7–10.1 mm for females. Like the cistus forester, the adult moth is iridescent blue green with dark legs and antennae. It is found on sunny days flying in chalk or limestone grassland.

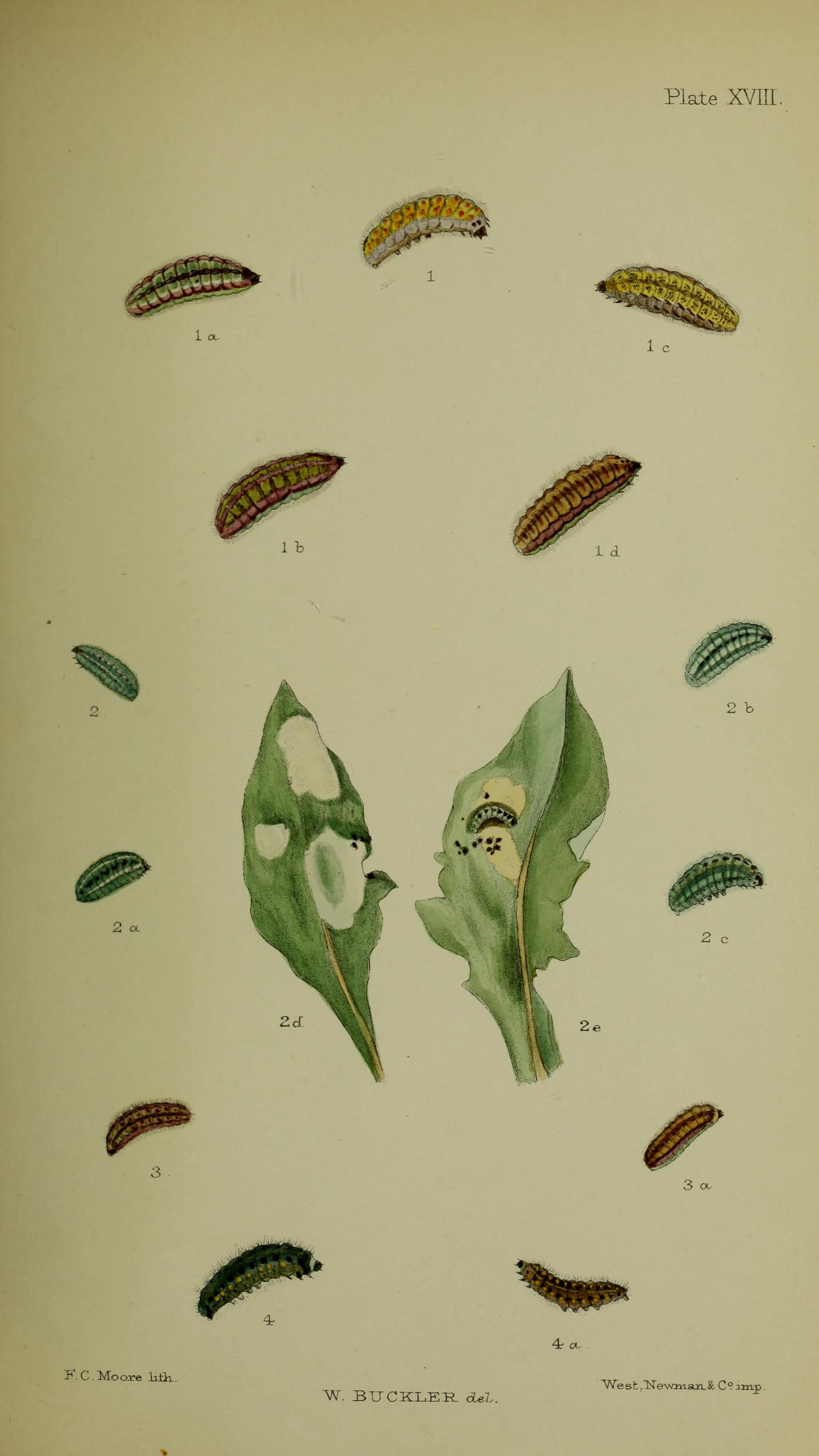
Figs. 2, 2a larvae before last moult 2b,2c larvae after last moult 2d leaves of Centaurea nigra mined and discoloured by the larva

The larvae feed on Centaurea (knapweed) species, Cirsium tuberosum (tuberous thistle) and Globularia species.

== Bibliography ==
- Šašić, Martina; Nahirnić, Ana; Tarmann, Gerhard M. (2016-12-31). "Zygaenidae (Lepidoptera) in the Lepidoptera collections of the Croatian Natural History Museum". Natura Croatica: Periodicum Musei Historiae Naturalis Croatici. 25 (2): 233–248. doi:10.20302/NC.2016.25.19. eISSN 1848-7386.
