= Josef Dostál =

Josef Dostál may refer to:

- Josef Dostál (botanist) (1903–1999), Czech botanist
- Josef Dostál (canoeist) (born 1993), Czech canoer
