= Jordanita hispanica =

Scientific classification
- Domain: Eukaryota
- Kingdom: Animalia
- Phylum: Arthropoda
- Class: Insecta
- Order: Lepidoptera
- Family: Zygaenidae
- Genus: Jordanita
- Species: J. hispanica

Binomial name
- Jordanita hispanica (Alberti, 1937)

Synonyms
- Procris hispanica Alberti, 1937

Species of moth

Jordanita hispanica is a moth of the family Zygaenidae. It is found in Spain, Portugal and southern France.

The length of the forewings is 9.1–14.2 mm for males and 6.4–9 mm for females. Individuals from Spain are bigger than those from France. Adults are on wing during the day and feed on the nectar of various flowers, including Knautia, Scabiosa and Centaurea species.

The larvae have been recorded feeding on Centaurea paniculata in southern France. They have a black head and a bright green body.

== Subspecies ==
- Jordanita hispanica hispanica
- Jordanita hispanica danieli (Alberti, 1937) (Pyrenees)
