= Jordanita carolae =

Scientific classification
- Domain: Eukaryota
- Kingdom: Animalia
- Phylum: Arthropoda
- Class: Insecta
- Order: Lepidoptera
- Family: Zygaenidae
- Genus: Jordanita
- Species: J. carolae

Binomial name
- Jordanita carolae (Dujardin, 1973)

Synonyms
- Procris carolae Dujardin, 1973

Species of moth

Jordanita carolae is a moth of the family Zygaenidae. It is found in the south-eastern High Atlas in Morocco at altitudes between 1,000 and 1,500 meters.

The length of the forewings is 8.2–9.1 mm for males and 8-8.5 mm for females. Adults are on wing from the end of April to the end of May.

The larvae probably feed on Echinops spinosus. When fully grown, they mine the leaves of their host plant.
