= Jordanita maroccana =

Scientific classification
- Domain: Eukaryota
- Kingdom: Animalia
- Phylum: Arthropoda
- Class: Insecta
- Order: Lepidoptera
- Family: Zygaenidae
- Genus: Jordanita
- Species: J. maroccana

Binomial name
- Jordanita maroccana (Naufock, 1937)

Synonyms
- Procris maroccana Naufock, 1937

Species of moth

Jordanita maroccana is a moth of the family Zygaenidae. It is found in the Middle Atlas in Morocco. It is found at altitudes of up to 2,000 meters.

The length of the forewings is 11.1–12.3 mm for males and 10.5–12 mm for females. Adults are on wing from April to the beginning of June.

The larvae probably feed on Carthamus species.
