= Jordanita fazekasi =

Scientific classification
- Kingdom: Animalia
- Phylum: Arthropoda
- Class: Insecta
- Order: Lepidoptera
- Family: Zygaenidae
- Genus: Jordanita
- Species: J. fazekasi

Binomial name
- Jordanita fazekasi Efetov, 1998

Species of moth

Jordanita fazekasi is a moth of the family Zygaenidae. It is found in southern Hungary.

The length of the forewings is 12.1–13.1 mm for males.
