= Jordanita minutissima =

Scientific classification
- Domain: Eukaryota
- Kingdom: Animalia
- Phylum: Arthropoda
- Class: Insecta
- Order: Lepidoptera
- Family: Zygaenidae
- Genus: Jordanita
- Species: J. minutissima

Binomial name
- Jordanita minutissima (Oberthür, 1916)

Synonyms
- Procris minutissima Oberthür, 1916

Species of moth

Jordanita minutissima is a moth of the family Zygaenidae. It is found in the Saharan Atlas and the Aurès Mountains.

The length of the forewings is 6.5–7 mm for males and females. Adults are on wing from May to June.

The larvae probably feed on Carthamus or Echinops species.
