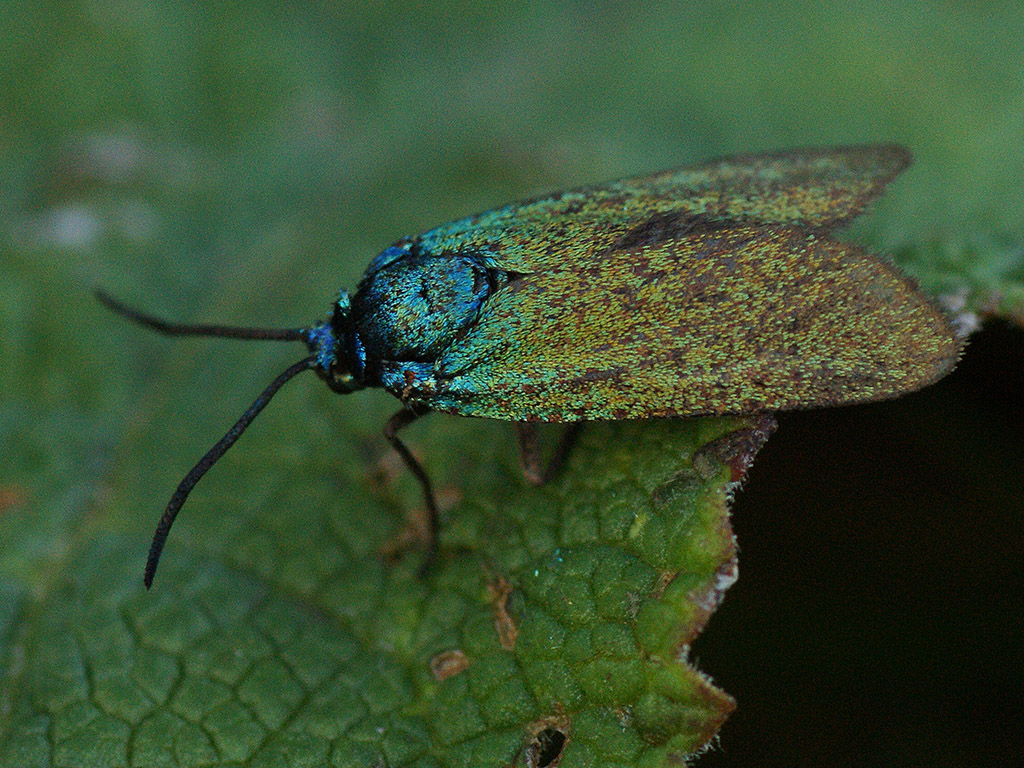

Scientific classification
- Kingdom: Animalia
- Phylum: Arthropoda
- Clade: Pancrustacea
- Class: Insecta
- Order: Lepidoptera
- Family: Zygaenidae
- Genus: Jordanita
- Species: J. chloros

Binomial name
- Jordanita chloros (Hübner, 1813)

Synonyms
- Sphinx chloros Hübner, 1813; Procris hades Alberti, 1970; Procris haegeri Alberti, 1973

= Jordanita chloros =

Species of moth

Jordanita chloros is a moth of the family Zygaenidae.

== Distribution ==
It is found from southern France, Italy and south-eastern Switzerland through southern, central and eastern Europe to the Caucasus, Turkey, northern Syria and northern Iraq. It is also found in eastern Kazakhstan and southern Siberia.

== Description ==
The length of the forewings is 7.8–12.8 mm for males and 7.6–11.5 mm for females.

== Biology ==
The larvae of subspecies chloros have been recorded feeding on Centaurea paniculata in France, Centaurea stoebe in Germany and Centaurea maculosa in Switzerland and northern Italy. In Austria and Hungary, the larvae feed on Centaurea scabiosa, Centaurea jacea and Centaurea triumfetti, while Carduus uncinutus, Carduus arabicus, Carduus salonitana and Jurinea sordida are the food plants in Ukraine. Larvae of subspecies hades feed on Staehelenia uniflosculosa in Greece.

Pupation takes place in a white cocoon at the ground. Adults are on wing from mid-June to August.

== Subspecies ==
- Jordanita chloros chloros (Europe except the Balkan Peninsula)
- Jordanita chloros hades (Alberti, 1970) (North Macedonia, Bulgaria and Greece)
- Jordanita chloros haegeri (Alberti, 1973) (Caucasus)

== Etymology ==
The name of the species is derived from the Greek χλωρός (meaning bright green).

== Bibliography ==
- C. M. Naumann, W. G. Tremewan: The Western Palaearctic Zygaenidae. Apollo Books, Stenstrup 1999, ISBN 87-88757-15-3
- Šašić, Martina; Nahirnić, Ana; Tarmann, Gerhard M. (2016-12-31). "Zygaenidae (Lepidoptera) in the Lepidoptera collections of the Croatian Natural History Museum". Natura Croatica: Periodicum Musei Historiae Naturalis Croatici. 25 (2): 233–248. doi:10.20302/NC.2016.25.19. eISSN 1848-7386.
