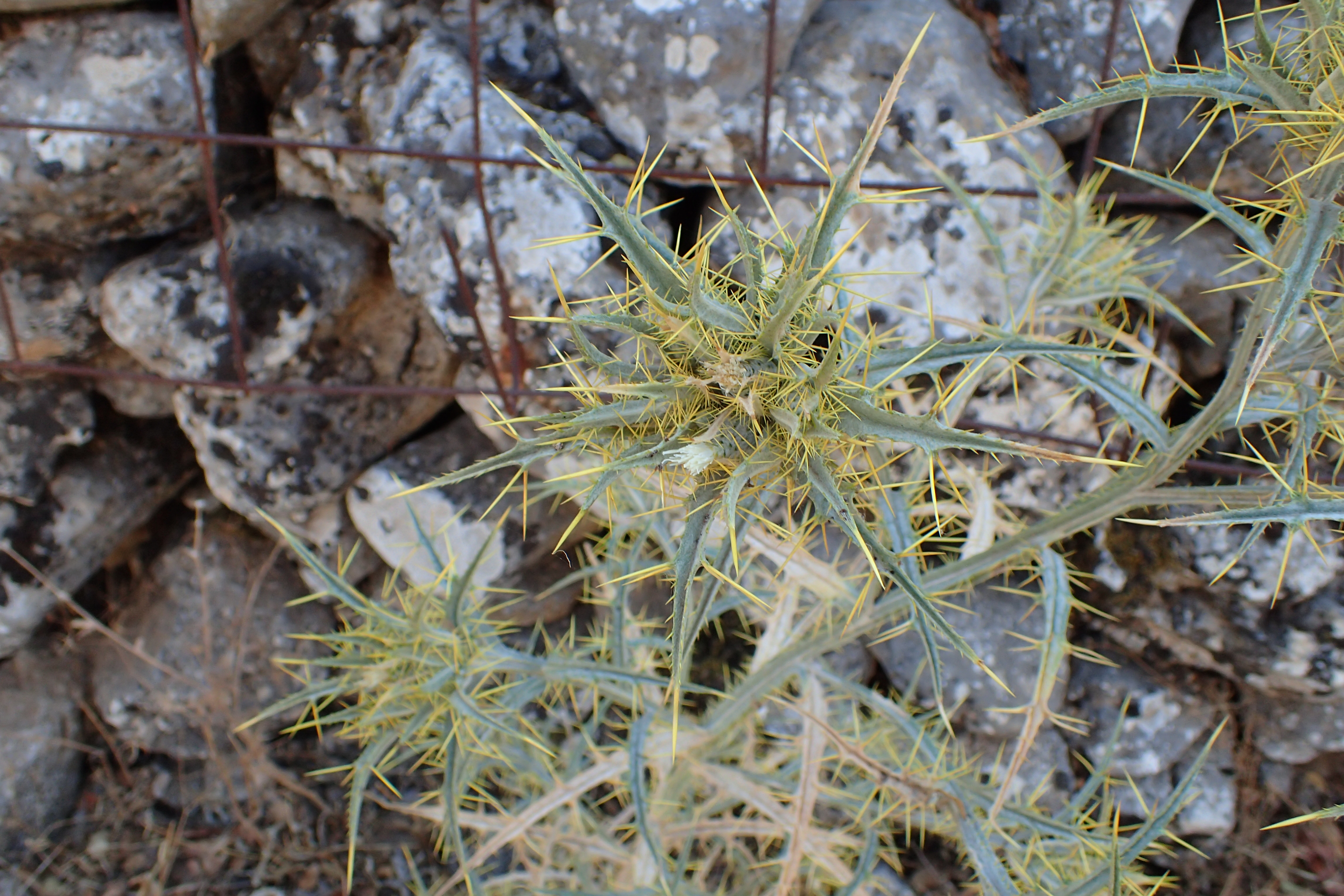

Scientific classification
- Kingdom: Plantae
- Clade: Tracheophytes
- Clade: Angiosperms
- Clade: Eudicots
- Clade: Asterids
- Order: Asterales
- Family: Asteraceae
- Genus: Carthamus
- Species: C. leucocaulos

Binomial name
- Carthamus leucocaulos Sibthorp & Smith

= Carthamus leucocaulos =

Species of flowering plant

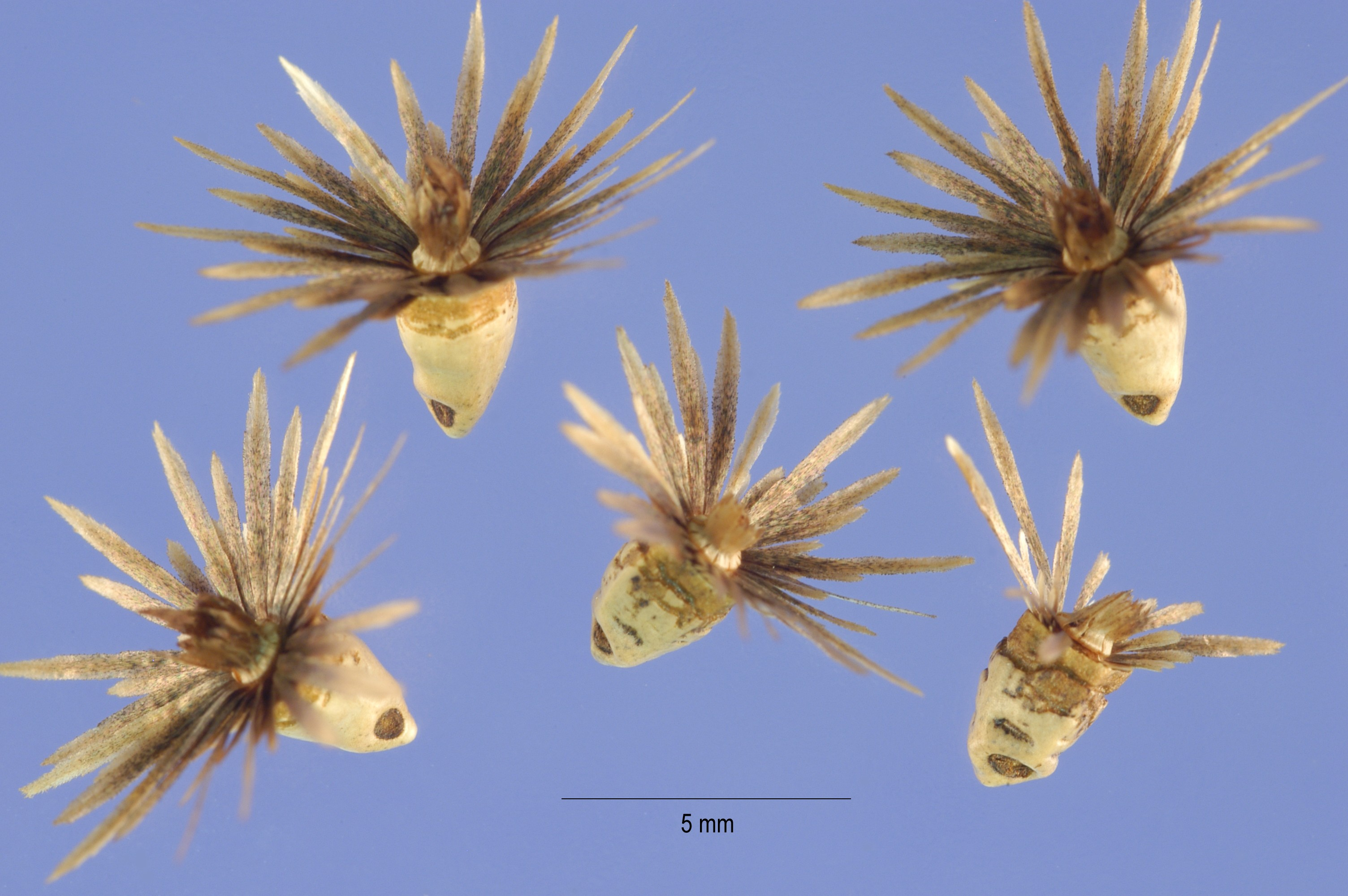
Carthamus leucocaulos achenes

Carthamus leucocaulos, the whitestem distaff thistle or glaucous starthistle, is a species of flowering plant in the family Asteraceae. It is native to Turkey, Greece, and the Aegean. It is known in California and Western Australia as an introduced species and a noxious weed.
