= S. I. Georgievsky Crimean State Medical University =

Ukrainian medical college

Coordinates: 44°57′39″N 34°05′16″E

- Кримський державний медичний університет ім. С. І. Георгієвського
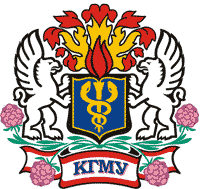
- Arms of the Crimea State Medical University
- Former names: S. I. Georgievsky Crimean Medical Institute (1995-1998); Crimean Medical Institute (1931-1995)
- Type: Public
- Active: 1931–2014
- Rector: Igor Verchenko
- Administrative staff: 850
- Undergraduates: 5000
- Location: Ukraine, 95006, Simferopol, 5/7, Lenin Avenue, Simferopol, Republic of Crimea, Ukraine
- Campus: Urban
- Website: http://www.ma.cfuv.ru
- Building details
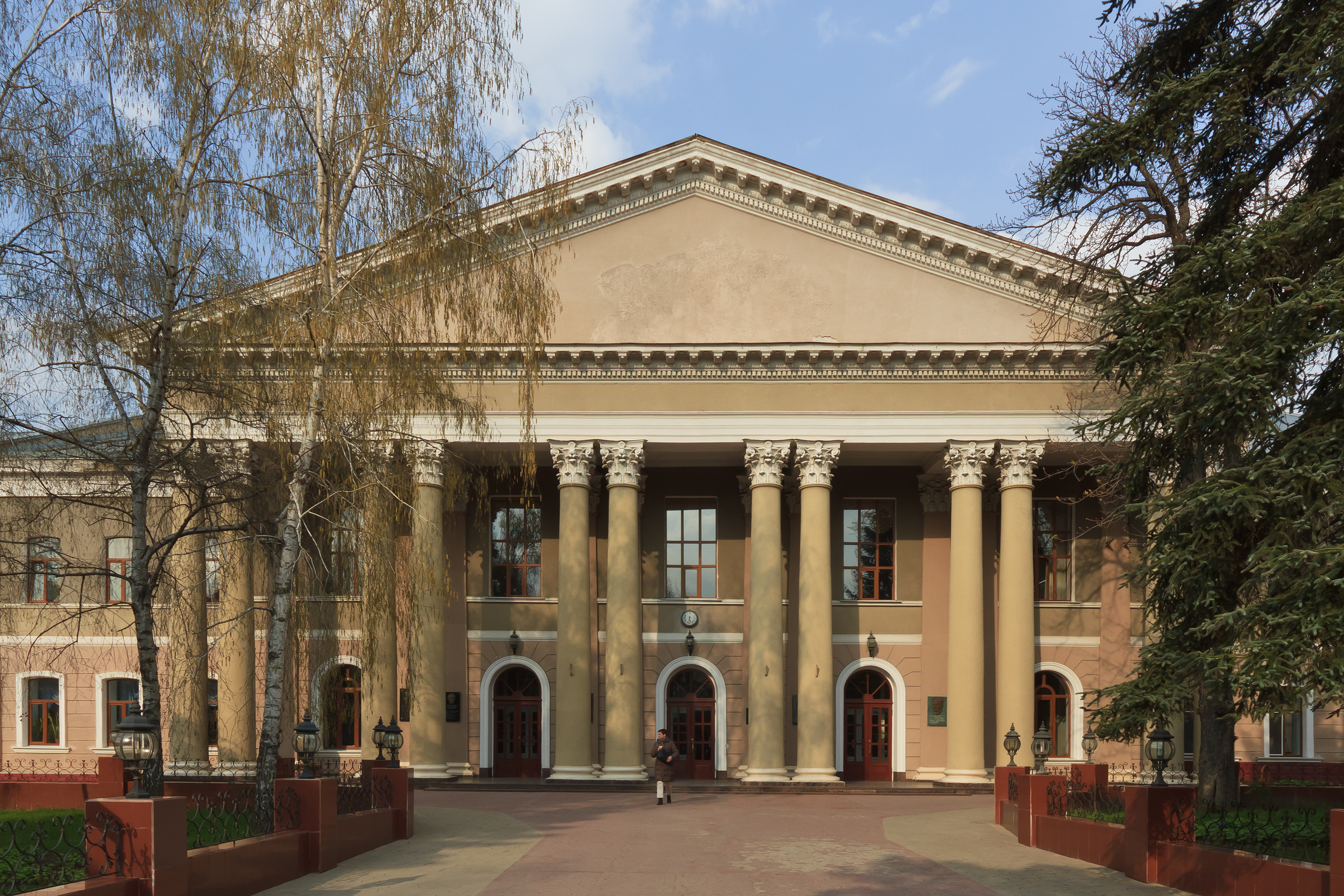

Immovable Monument of Local Significance of Ukraine
- Official name: Будинок службового корпусу медичного університету (Service building of the medical university)
- Type: Architecture, Urban Planning
- Reference no.: 4632-АР

The S. I. Georgievsky Crimean State Medical University (Ukrainian: Кримський державний медичний університет ім. С. І. Георгієвського; Crimean Tatar: Qırım Devlet Üniversitesi S. Georgiyevski) was a medical university situated in Simferopol, Crimea. It was one of the most prominent medical schools in Ukraine. Following the 2014 annexation of Crimea by Russia, the medical school was merged with the Russian controlled Crimean Federal University in 2014.

The university had 6 faculties and 54 departments. As of 2009, 4700 students were studying there, among them approximately 1700 were foreign students. The university was decorated with Order of the Red Banner of Labour (1981) and was certified by the International Education Society as AA-level high school, giving its priority under top 1000 medical university around the world.

== History ==
The history of CSMU began with the medical faculty of V. I. Vernadsky Taurida National University, which was founded on 10 May 1918. R. I. Gelvig was the first rector of the university and the dean of medical faculty at the same time. The first graduation of doctors had taken place in 1922; a total of 523 doctors had graduated during the faculty's existence. In 1925 the university was reorganized as a pedagogical institute and the medical faculty was liquidated.

Due to development of Crimea as a health resort, it was decided in 1930 to organize higher medical school here. The solemn opening of the Crimean Medical Institute (which consisted of one treatment-and-prophylactic faculty only) took place on 1 April 1931. The first graduation (97 students) occurred on 17 February 1936. The second faculty, that is pediatric, was organized in 1938. In 1939 the treatment-and-prophylactic faculty was renamed the medical faculty.

In the time of the German invasion of the Soviet Union, the university continued working in evacuation (at first in Armavir, then in Jambul, Orjonikidze, Baku, Krasnovodsk, Kyzylorda). In sum, since June 1941 until July 1944, the institute prepared 850 doctors.

In 1951 S. I. Georgievsky was appointed a director (subsequently a rector) of the institute (the university carries his name now). In the fifties the material base of the institute was considerably expanded. Since 1961 the institute begins preparation of medical shots for the countries of Asia, Africa and Latin America. In 1970 new rector, professor V. I. Zyablov was appointed. In 1978 a new faculty (Stomatologic) was opened. In 1979 the faculty of Postgraduating Studies was launched. In 1981 the institute was decorated with Order of the Red Banner of Labour. In the late eighties the Crimean medical institute was included into 3 top medical high schools of the USSR. In 1989 professor I. V. Bogadelnikov was elected as a new rector. Since 1992 the institute begins commercial trainings for foreign citizens, and since 1994 – for the citizens of Ukraine.

In July 1995 the Crimean Medical Institute was accredited on IV (higher) level with autonomy granted. On 8 December 1995 the institute was named in honor of S. I. Georgievskiy for his personal contribution for institute's restoration and development. Since September 1996 professor A. A. Babanin heads the institute. On 26 January 1998 the Cabinet of Ukraine decided to transform the Crimean Medical Institute into the university.

In 2014, following the annexation of Crimea by Russia, plans were announced to establish a federal university in Crimea, which was initially planned to include CSMU, which caused opposition from the workforce. On August 4, 2014, CSMU was included in the new Crimean Federal University by the Russian Government decree.

On January 28, 2015, by decree of the head of the Republic of Crimea Sergey Aksyonov, the rector of CSMU A.A. Babanin was dismissed from his post, and N.V. Ivanova was appointed to the post of director of the medical academy.

During February, 2015, the process of transferring staff and students of the medical university to Crimean Federal University took place. On March 2, 2015, information was announced about completion of the transfer of CSMU to Crimean Federal University.

== Awards and reputation ==
- Year 1981. The institute was awarded the Order of the Red Banner of Labour.
- 69th place in rating of world higher medical schools within UNESCO project "TOP 200" 2017 year

It was also listed in webometrics and ranked 3316 under crimean federal university and alone stands among the best at rank 3512

== Notable alumni ==
- Gavriil Ilizarov, orthopedic surgeon
- Konstantin Efetov, biochemist and entomologist
