= Jordanita cognata =

Scientific classification
- Domain: Eukaryota
- Kingdom: Animalia
- Phylum: Arthropoda
- Class: Insecta
- Order: Lepidoptera
- Family: Zygaenidae
- Genus: Jordanita
- Species: J. cognata

Binomial name
- Jordanita cognata (Herrich-Schäffer, 1852)

Species of moth

Jordanita cognata is a moth of the family Zygaenidae. It is found in northern Algeria and western Tunisia.

The length of the forewings is 14–17.5 mm for males and 10.5–11.5 mm for females. Adults are on wing from April to May.
