= Jordanita cirtana =

Scientific classification
- Kingdom: Animalia
- Phylum: Arthropoda
- Clade: Pancrustacea
- Class: Insecta
- Order: Lepidoptera
- Family: Zygaenidae
- Genus: Jordanita
- Species: J. cirtana

Binomial name
- Jordanita cirtana (H. Lucas, 1849)

Synonyms
- Procris cirtana H. Lucas, 1849

Species of moth

Jordanita cirtana is a moth of the family Zygaenidae first described by Hippolyte Lucas in 1849. It is found in northern Algeria and Tunisia.

The length of the forewings is 8–10 mm for males and 7–10 mm for females. Adults are on wing from May to June.
