= Jordanita chloronota =

Scientific classification
- Kingdom: Animalia
- Phylum: Arthropoda
- Class: Insecta
- Order: Lepidoptera
- Family: Zygaenidae
- Genus: Jordanita
- Species: J. chloronota

Binomial name
- Jordanita chloronota (Staudinger, 1871)

Synonyms
- Ino chloros var. chloronota Staudinger 1871

Species of moth

Jordanita chloronota is a moth of the family Zygaenidae. It is found in southern Turkey, where it is only known from the southern side of the Taurus Mountains.

The length of the forewings is 12–13.1 mm for males and 9–10 mm for females. Adults are on wing in June.
