= Jordanita horni =

Scientific classification
- Domain: Eukaryota
- Kingdom: Animalia
- Phylum: Arthropoda
- Class: Insecta
- Order: Lepidoptera
- Family: Zygaenidae
- Genus: Jordanita
- Species: J. horni

Binomial name
- Jordanita horni (Alberti, 1937)

Synonyms
- Procris horni Alberti, 1937

Species of moth

Jordanita horni is a moth of the family Zygaenidae. It is found in Turkey, Armenia, Nakhchivan and northern Iran.

The length of the forewings is 9.1–11 mm for males and 9.2–10 mm for females. Adults are on wing from the end of June to the end of July.
