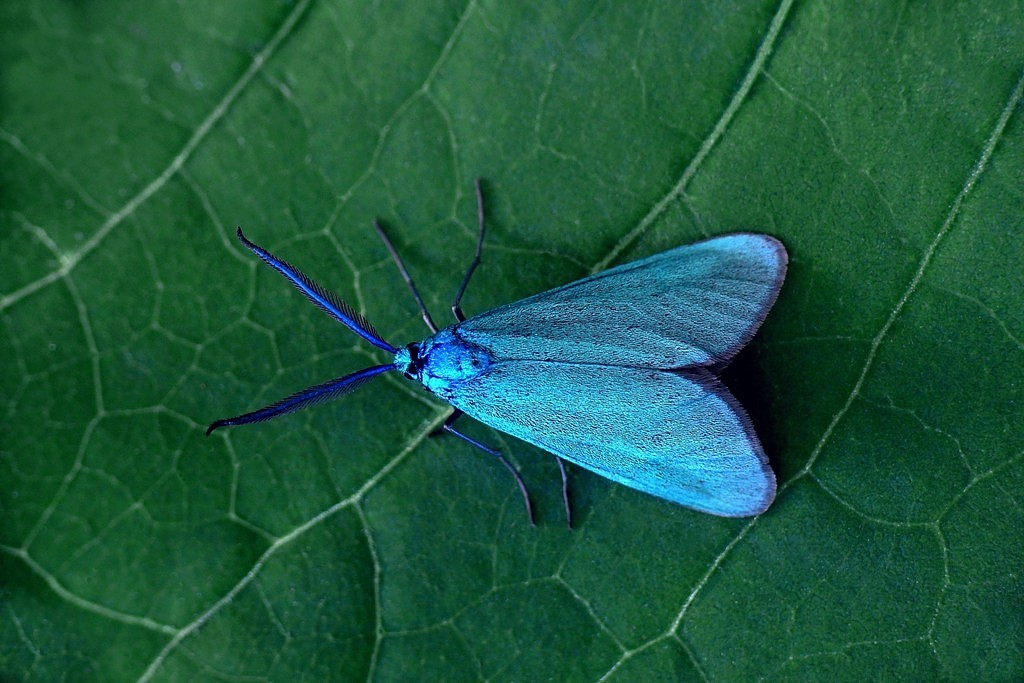
- Jordanita notata

Scientific classification
- Kingdom: Animalia
- Phylum: Arthropoda
- Clade: Pancrustacea
- Class: Insecta
- Order: Lepidoptera
- Family: Zygaenidae
- Genus: Jordanita
- Species: J. notata

Binomial name
- Jordanita notata (Zeller, 1847)

Synonyms
- Atychia notata Zeller, 1847; Procris notata

= Jordanita notata =

Species of moth

Jordanita notata is a moth of the family Zygaenidae. It is found from the Iberian Peninsula and central Europe, through the northern part of the Mediterranean region (including Sicily and Crete) to the Caucasus and Transcaucasia.

The length of the forewings is 11–16 mm for males and 7.5–10.5 mm for females.

The larvae feed on Centaurea jacea, Centaurea scabiosa and Cirsium species. They mine the leaves of their host plant.

== Bibliography ==
- C. M. Naumann, W. G. Tremewan: The Western Palaearctic Zygaenidae. Apollo Books, Stenstrup 1999, ISBN 87-88757-15-3
- Šašić, Martina; Nahirnić, Ana; Tarmann, Gerhard M. (2016-12-31). "Zygaenidae (Lepidoptera) in the Lepidoptera collections of the Croatian Natural History Museum". Natura Croatica: Periodicum Musei Historiae Naturalis Croatici. 25 (2): 233–248. doi:10.20302/NC.2016.25.19. eISSN 1848-7386.
