= Jordanita paupera =

Scientific classification
- Domain: Eukaryota
- Kingdom: Animalia
- Phylum: Arthropoda
- Class: Insecta
- Order: Lepidoptera
- Family: Zygaenidae
- Genus: Jordanita
- Species: J. paupera

Binomial name
- Jordanita paupera (Christoph, 1887)

Synonyms
- Ino paupera Zeller, 1847

Species of moth

Jordanita paupera is a moth of the family Zygaenidae. It is found in Turkey, Transcaucasia, Jordan, northern Iran, Turkmenistan, Uzbekistan and Kazakhstan, extending to the Amur and Korea in the east.

The forewing length is 12–12.8 mm for males and 9–10.5 mm for females. Adults are on wing from June to July.

The larvae feed on Artemisia species.
