= Jordanita algirica =

Scientific classification
- Domain: Eukaryota
- Kingdom: Animalia
- Phylum: Arthropoda
- Class: Insecta
- Order: Lepidoptera
- Family: Zygaenidae
- Genus: Jordanita
- Species: J. algirica

Binomial name
- Jordanita algirica (Rothschild, 1917)

Synonyms
- Procris algirica Rothschild, 1917

Species of moth

Jordanita algirica is a moth of the family Zygaenidae. It is found in Morocco, Algeria and Tunisia. There are also some unconfirmed records from Sicily.

The length of the forewings is 8.1–13 mm for males and 7.1–12 mm for females. Adults are on wing from April onwards on low altitudes and up to July in mountainous areas. They feed on the flower nectar of various Asteraceae species.

In Morocco, J. algirica is a very variable species.

The larvae feed on Carthamus calvus.
