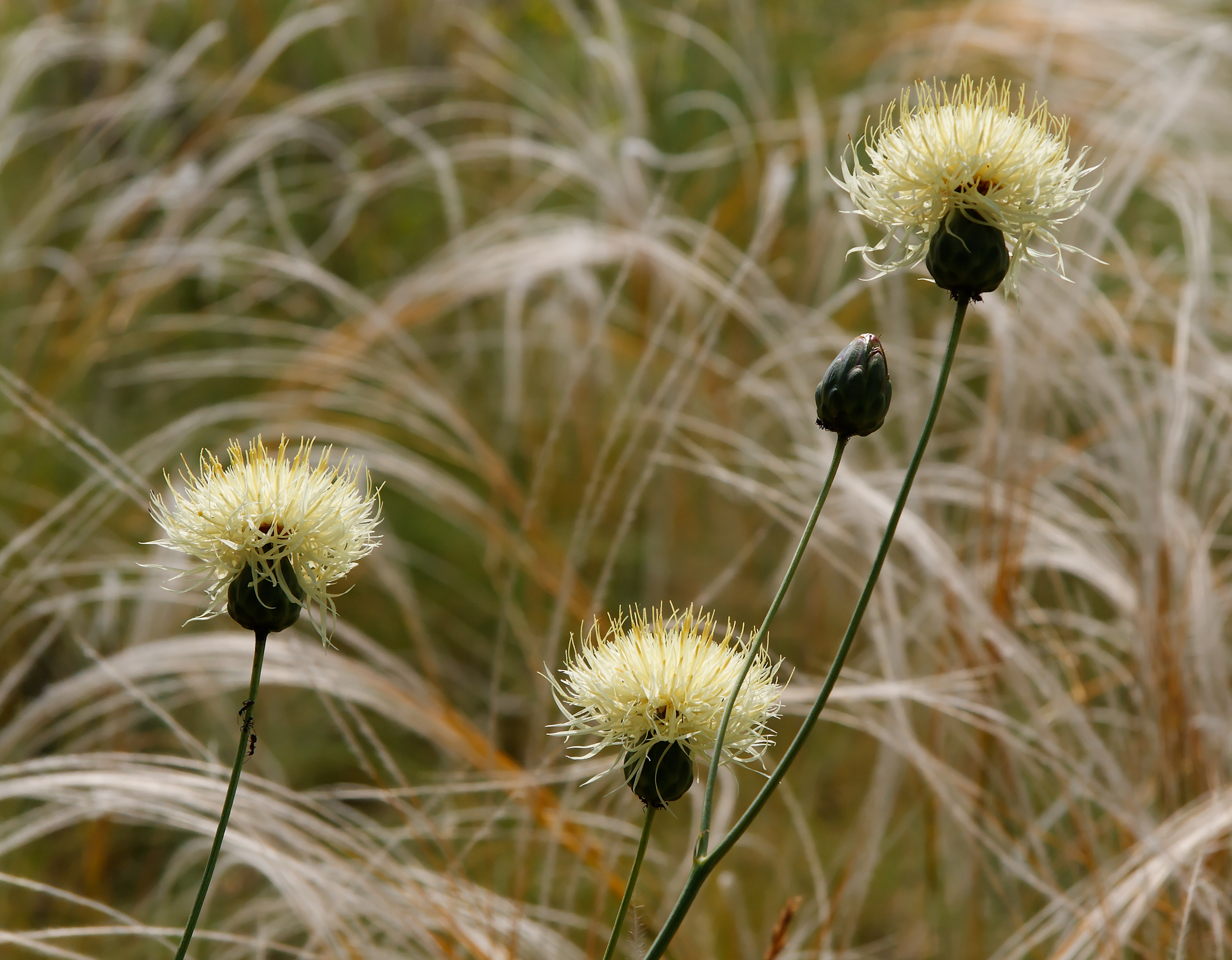
- Rhaponticoides ruthenica here given as Centaurea ruthenica

Scientific classification
- Kingdom: Plantae
- Clade: Tracheophytes
- Clade: Angiosperms
- Clade: Eudicots
- Clade: Asterids
- Order: Asterales
- Family: Asteraceae
- Tribe: Cardueae
- Subtribe: Centaureinae
- Genus: Rhaponticoides; Vaill.

Species
- See text

Synonyms
- Bielzia Schur

= Rhaponticoides =

Genus of flowering plants

Rhaponticoides is a genus of flowering plants in the family Asteraceae, found in northern Africa, southern and eastern Europe, and western Asia as far east as Mongolia. They were resurrected from Centaurea.

In the 20th century the genus Centaurea was paraphyletic, because it was based on a type species, C. centaurium, which was less related to the vast majority of other Centaurea than to species which were classified as belonging to other genera. In 2001 Werner Greuter solved this by moving the C. centaurium and the related species in the former subgenus Centaurea to an old, resurrected genus: Rhaponticoides, he conserved the name Centaurea for the majority of the other species, and electing C. paniculata to serve as the new type species.

== Species ==
Currently accepted species include:

- Rhaponticoides africana (Lam.) M.V.Agab. & Greuter
- Rhaponticoides alpina (L.) M.V.Agab. & Greuter
- Rhaponticoides amasiensis (Bornm.) M.V.Agab. & Greuter
- Rhaponticoides amplifolia (Boiss. & Heldr.) M.V.Agab. & Greuter
- Rhaponticoides aytachii Bagci, Dogu & Dinç
- Rhaponticoides bachtiarica (Boiss. & Hausskn.) L.Martins
- Rhaponticoides calabrica Puntillo & Peruzzi
- Rhaponticoides centaurium (L.) M.V.Agab. & Greuter
- Rhaponticoides dschungarica (C.Shih) L.Martins
- Rhaponticoides eriosiphon (Emb. & Maire) M.V.Agab. & Greuter
- Rhaponticoides fraylensis (Nyman) M.V.Agab. & Greuter
- Rhaponticoides gokceoglui Çinbilgel, Eren & H.Duman
- Rhaponticoides hajastana (Tzvelev) M.V.Agab. & Greuter
- Rhaponticoides hierroi Eren
- Rhaponticoides iconiensis (Hub.-Mor.) M.V.Agab. & Greuter
- Rhaponticoides kasakorum (Iljin) M.V.Agab. & Greuter
- Rhaponticoides linaresii (Lázaro Ibiza) M.V.Agab. & Greuter
- Rhaponticoides mykalea (Hub.-Mor.) M.V.Agab. & Greuter
- Rhaponticoides pythiae (Azn. & Bornm.) M.V.Agab. & Greuter
- Rhaponticoides razdorskyi (Karjagin ex Sosn.) M.V.Agab. & Greuter
- Rhaponticoides ruthenica (Lam.) M.V.Agab. & Greuter
- Rhaponticoides taliewii (Kleopow) M.V.Agab. & Greuter
- Rhaponticoides tamanianae (M.V.Agab.) M.V.Agab. & Greuter
- Rhaponticoides wagenitziana (Bancheva & Kit Tan) M.V.Agab. & Greuter
