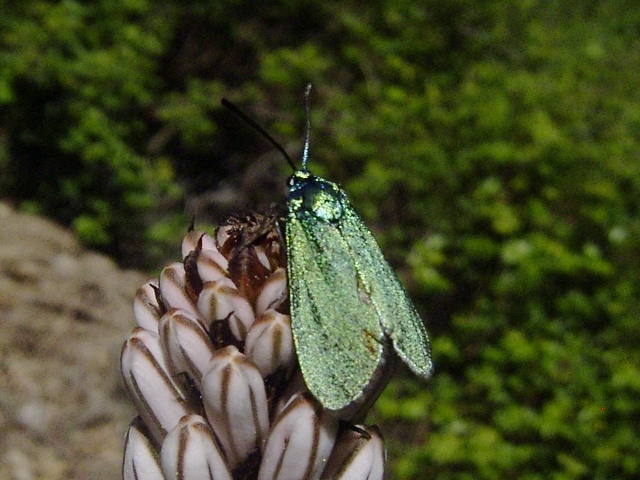

Scientific classification
- Domain: Eukaryota
- Kingdom: Animalia
- Phylum: Arthropoda
- Class: Insecta
- Order: Lepidoptera
- Family: Zygaenidae
- Subfamily: Procridinae
- Genus: Jordanita; Verity, 1946

= Jordanita =

Genus of moths

Jordanita is a genus of moths of the family Zygaenidae.

== Selected species ==
- Subgenus Roccia Alberti, 1954
  - Jordanita budensis (Speyer & Speyer, 1858)
  - Jordanita paupera (Christoph, 1887)
  - Jordanita volgensis (Möschler, 1862)
  - Jordanita kurdica (Tarmann, 1987)
  - Jordanita hector (Jordan, 1907)
  - Jordanita notata (Zeller, 1847)
- Subgenus Gregorita Povolný & Šmelhaus, 1951
  - Jordanita hispanica (Alberti, 1937)
  - Jordanita algirica (Tarmann, 1985)
  - Jordanita minutissima (Oberthür, 1916)
  - Jordanita carolae (Dujardin, 1973)
  - Jordanita rungsi (Dujardin, 1973)
  - Jordanita cognata (Herrich-Schäffer, 1852)
  - Jordanita benderi (Rothschild, 1917)
  - Jordanita maroccana (Naufock, 1937)
- Subgenus Lucasiterna Alberti, 1961
  - Jordanita cirtana (Lucas, 1849)
  - Jordanita subsolana (Staudinger, 1862)
- Subgenus Rjabovia Efetov & Tarmann, 1995
  - Jordanita horni (Alberti, 1937)
- Subgenus Jordanita Verity, 1946
  - Jordanita syriaca (Alberti, 1937)
  - Jordanita graeca (Jordan, 1907)
  - Jordanita chloros (Hübner, 1813)
  - Jordanita chloronota (Staudinger, 1871)
  - Jordanita globulariae (Hübner, 1793)
  - Jordanita tenuicornis (Zeller, 1847)
  - Jordanita fazekasi Efetov, 1998
  - Jordanita vartianae Malicky, 1961
- Subgenus Praviela Alberti, 1954
  - Jordanita anatolica (Naufock, 1929)

== Also See ==
- List of moths of Great Britain (Zygaenidae)
