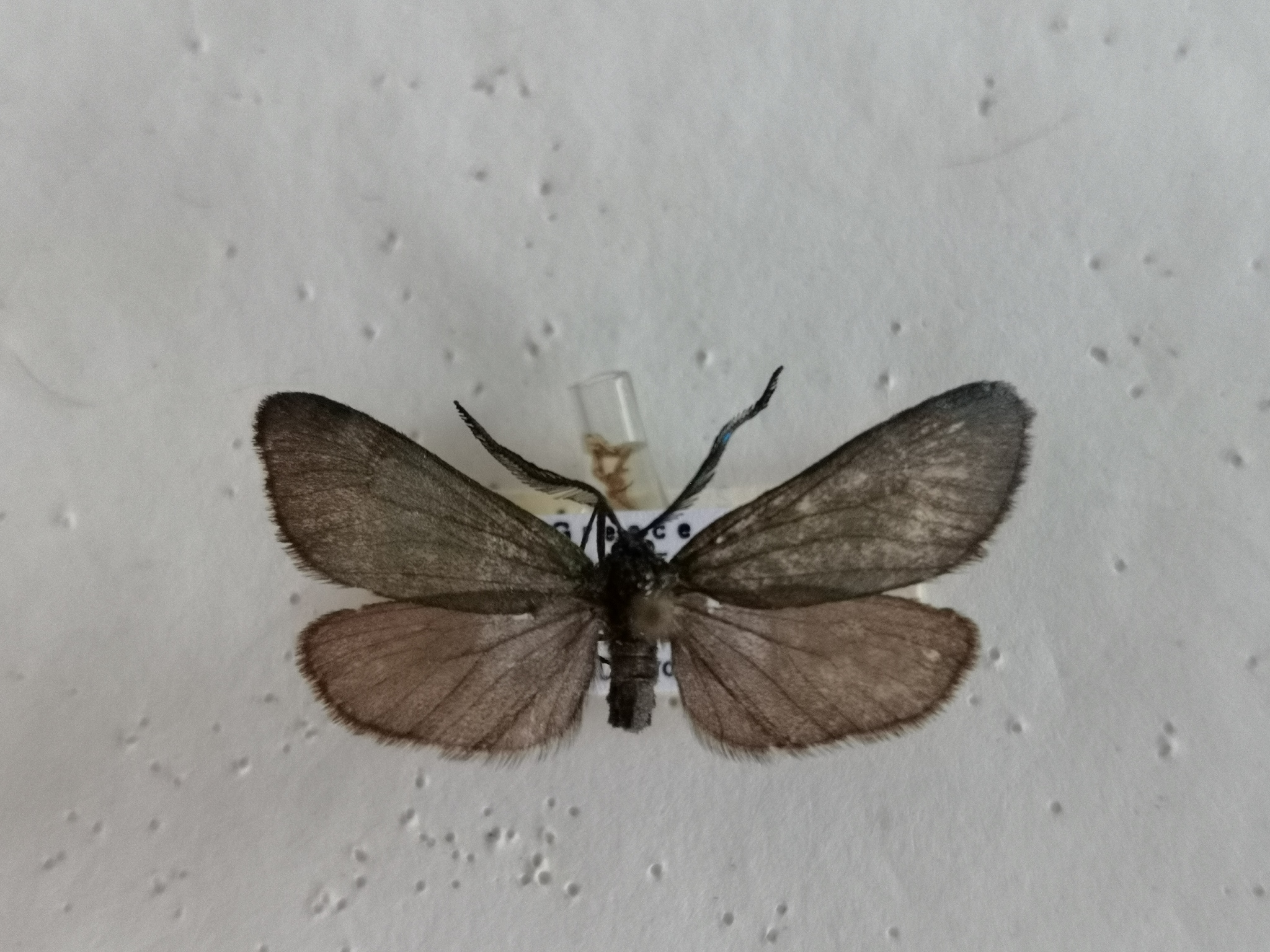

Scientific classification
- Kingdom: Animalia
- Phylum: Arthropoda
- Class: Insecta
- Order: Lepidoptera
- Family: Zygaenidae
- Genus: Jordanita
- Species: J. subsolana

Binomial name
- Jordanita subsolana (Staudinger, 1862)

Synonyms
- Ino subsolana Staudinger, 1862

= Jordanita subsolana =

Species of moth

Jordanita subsolana is a moth of the family Zygaenidae. It is found from southern Spain though the southern part of central Europe, Italy, the Balkan Peninsula and Greece to southern Russia and Ukraine, Turkey and Transcaucasia up to the Altai.

The length of the forewings is 12–16 mm (0.47–0.63 in) for males and 9–12.5 mm (0.35–0.49 in) for females. Adults are on wing from the end of June to the start of August in central Europe and from May to July in the southern part of the range.

== Bibliography ==
- C. M. Naumann, W. G. Tremewan: The Western Palaearctic Zygaenidae. Apollo Books, Stenstrup 1999, ISBN 87-88757-15-3
- Šašić, Martina; Nahirnić, Ana; Tarmann, Gerhard M. (2016-12-31). "Zygaenidae (Lepidoptera) in the Lepidoptera collections of the Croatian Natural History Museum". Natura Croatica: Periodicum Musei Historiae Naturalis Croatici. 25 (2): 233–248. doi:10.20302/NC.2016.25.19. eISSN 1848-7386.
