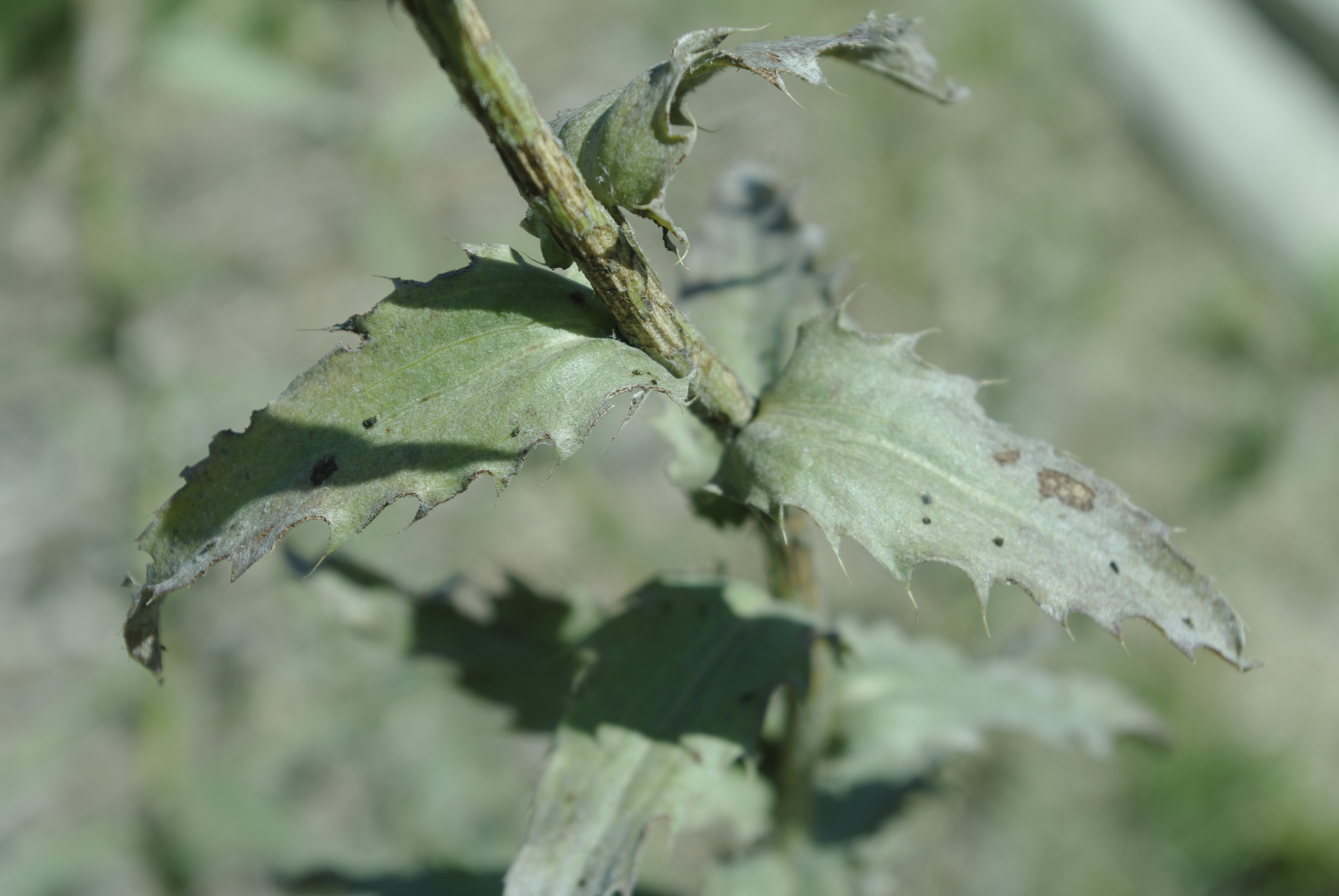
- At Botanical Garden of Barcelona

Scientific classification
- Kingdom: Plantae
- Clade: Tracheophytes
- Clade: Angiosperms
- Clade: Eudicots
- Clade: Asterids
- Order: Asterales
- Family: Asteraceae
- Genus: Carthamus
- Species: C. caeruleus

Binomial name
- Carthamus caeruleus L.

Synonyms
- Carthamus tingitanus

= Carthamus caeruleus =

Species of plant

Carthamus caeruleus is a species of plants in the family Asteraceae.

== Sources ==
This article incorporates text from a free content work. Licensed under CC0 (license statement/permission). Text taken from Carthamus caeruleus. Encyclopedia of Life.
