= Jordanita vartianae =

Scientific classification
- Domain: Eukaryota
- Kingdom: Animalia
- Phylum: Arthropoda
- Class: Insecta
- Order: Lepidoptera
- Family: Zygaenidae
- Genus: Jordanita
- Species: J. vartianae

Binomial name
- Jordanita vartianae Malicky, 1961

Species of moth

Jordanita vartianae is a moth of the family Zygaenidae. It is endemic to southern and central Spain.

The length of the forewings is 13.7–14.7 mm for males and 9.0–9.5 mm for females.
