= Jordanita syriaca =

Scientific classification
- Domain: Eukaryota
- Kingdom: Animalia
- Phylum: Arthropoda
- Class: Insecta
- Order: Lepidoptera
- Family: Zygaenidae
- Genus: Jordanita
- Species: J. syriaca

Binomial name
- Jordanita syriaca (Alberti, 1937)

Synonyms
- Procris syriaca Alberti, 1937

Species of moth

Jordanita syriaca is a moth of the family Zygaenidae. It is found in Syria, Lebanon and Israel.

The length of the forewings is 10.4–11 mm for males and about 10.5 mm for females.
