= Jordanita volgensis =

Scientific classification
- Domain: Eukaryota
- Kingdom: Animalia
- Phylum: Arthropoda
- Class: Insecta
- Order: Lepidoptera
- Family: Zygaenidae
- Genus: Jordanita
- Species: J. volgensis

Binomial name
- Jordanita volgensis (Möschler, 1862)

Synonyms
- Ino volgensis Möschler, 1862

Species of moth

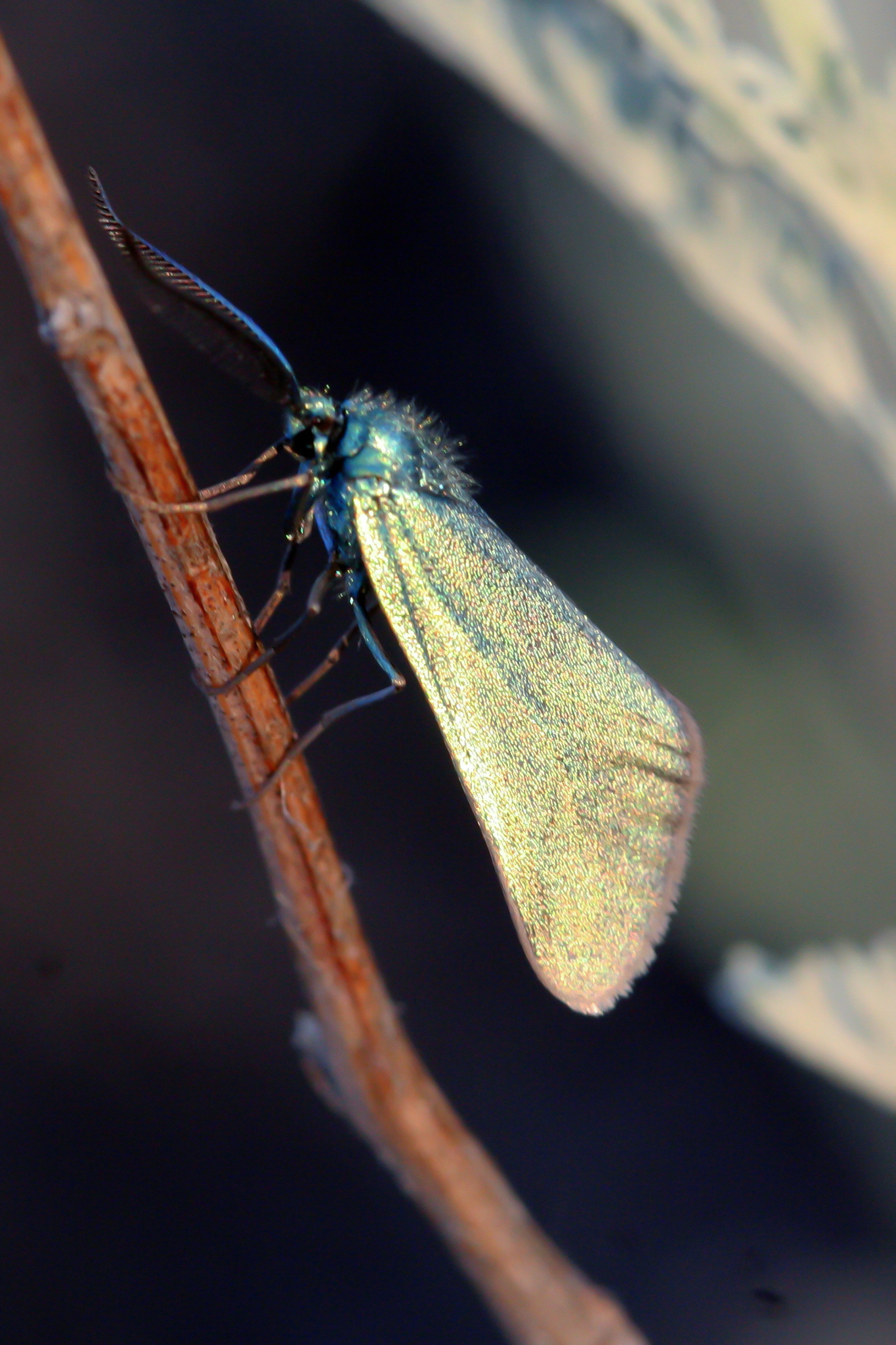
Jordanita Volgensis

Jordanita volgensis is a moth of the family Zygaenidae. It is known from eastern Ukraine, southern Russia, Transcaucasia, Turkey and Syria.

The length of the forewings is 11.5–15.5 mm for males and 8.8–9.5 mm for females. Adults are on wing from May to June.

== Subspecies ==
- Jordanita volgensis volgensis (Möschler, 1862): This subspecies has small forewings with a length of 11.5–12 mm. The forewings are transparent and gold to gold green, as is the body. It is known from the Volga region, the Caucasus, the southern Ural region, southern Siberia and northern Kazakhstan.
- Jordanita volgensis muelleri Alberti, 1974: This subspecies has small forewings with a length of 11.5–12.5 mm. The forewing upperside is blue green or green and the body is dark with a blue-green shimmering. It is known from Transcaucasia.
- Jordanita volgensis grandis Alberti, 1974: This subspecies is large with forewings reaching a length of up to 15.5 mm in males. It is known from Turkey.
