= Jordanita kurdica =

Scientific classification
- Domain: Eukaryota
- Kingdom: Animalia
- Phylum: Arthropoda
- Class: Insecta
- Order: Lepidoptera
- Family: Zygaenidae
- Genus: Jordanita
- Species: J. kurdica

Binomial name
- Jordanita kurdica (Tarmann, 1987)

Synonyms
- Adscita kurdica Tarmann, 1987

Species of moth

Jordanita kurdica is a moth of the family Zygaenidae. It is known from south-eastern Turkey and western Iran.

The length of the forewings is 15.5–17 mm for males and about 11.5 mm for females. Adults are on wing from June to July.
