= Jordanita hector =

Scientific classification
- Kingdom: Animalia
- Phylum: Arthropoda
- Class: Insecta
- Order: Lepidoptera
- Family: Zygaenidae
- Genus: Jordanita
- Species: J. hector

Binomial name
- Jordanita hector (Jordan, 1907)

Synonyms
- Roccia hector Jordan, 1909

Species of moth

Jordanita hector is a moth of the family Zygaenidae. It is known from southern Turkey and Lebanon.

The length of the forewings is 13–14 mm for males and 9.5–12 mm for females. Adults are on wing at the end of May.

The larvae probably feed on Centaurea cheirolopha.
