= Jordanita rungsi =

Scientific classification
- Domain: Eukaryota
- Kingdom: Animalia
- Phylum: Arthropoda
- Class: Insecta
- Order: Lepidoptera
- Family: Zygaenidae
- Genus: Jordanita
- Species: J. rungsi

Binomial name
- Jordanita rungsi (Dujardin, 1973)

Synonyms
- Adscita rungsi Dujardin, 1973

Species of moth

Jordanita rungsi is a moth of the family Zygaenidae. It is found in the central areas of the Middle Atlas in Morocco.

The length of the forewings is 11.9–12.2 mm for males and 11.0–11.2 mm for females.

The larvae feed on Carthamus calvus. Pupation takes place in a cocoon in the soil.
