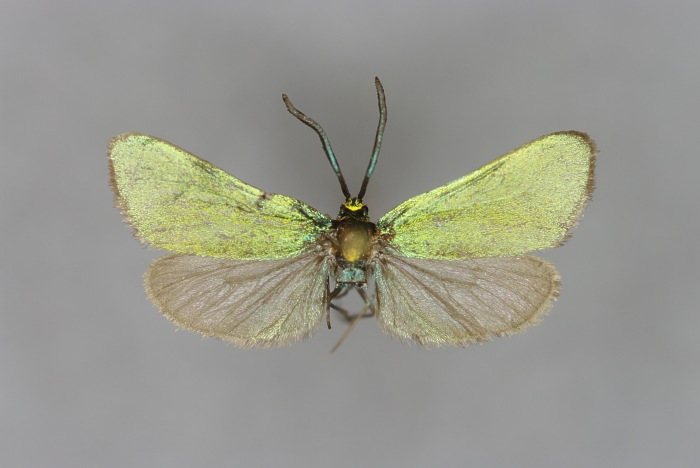

Scientific classification
- Kingdom: Animalia
- Phylum: Arthropoda
- Clade: Pancrustacea
- Class: Insecta
- Order: Lepidoptera
- Family: Zygaenidae
- Genus: Jordanita
- Species: J. tenuicornis

Binomial name
- Jordanita tenuicornis (Zeller, 1847)

Synonyms
- Atychia tenuicornis Zeller, 1847; Ino turatii Bartel, 1906

= Jordanita tenuicornis =

Species of moth

Jordanita tenuicornis is a moth of the family Zygaenidae.

== Distribution ==
It is found in southern and central Italy and Sicily.

== Description ==
The length of the forewings is 10–12.8 mm for males and 8–10.8 mm for females.

== Biology ==
The young larvae of subspecies turatii feed on Carlina vulgaris and Centaurea ambigua, while mature larvae of this subspecies mine the leaves of Cirsium arvense and Centaurea species. The mine has the form of a fleck mine. The opening is a slit at the side of the mine.

Adults are on wing from April (on Sicily) to July (mountains of Italy).

== Subspecies ==
- Jordanita tenuicornis tenuicornis (southern Italy and Sicily)
- Jordanita tenuicornis turatii (Bartel, 1906) (central Italy)
