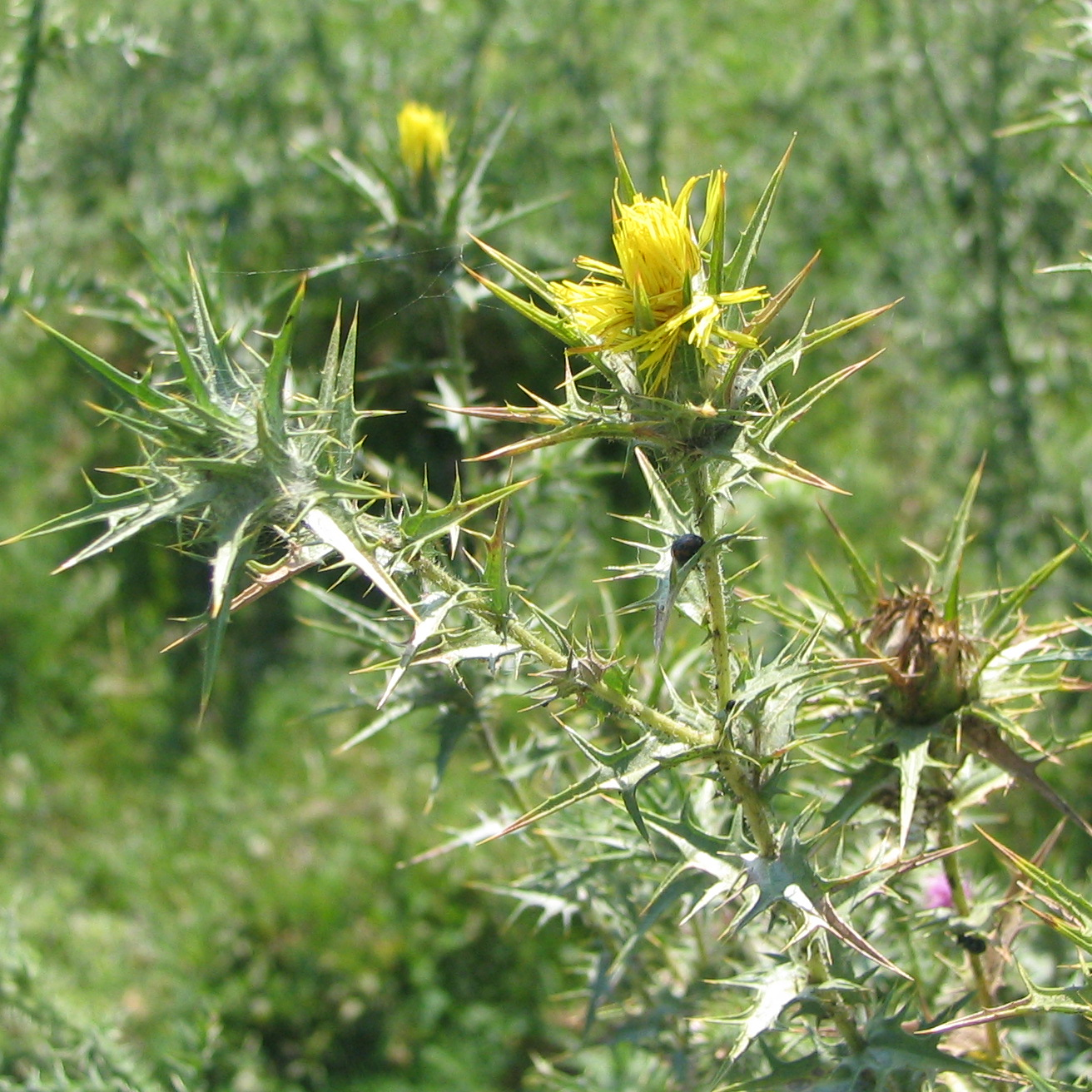

Scientific classification
- Kingdom: Plantae
- Clade: Tracheophytes
- Clade: Angiosperms
- Clade: Eudicots
- Clade: Asterids
- Order: Asterales
- Family: Asteraceae
- Genus: Carthamus
- Species: C. lanatus

Binomial name
- Carthamus lanatus L.

Synonyms
- Carthamus baeticus

= Carthamus lanatus =

Species of flowering plant

Carthamus lanatus is a species of thistle known as woolly distaff thistle, downy safflower or saffron thistle. It is closely related to safflower (Carthamus tinctorius). This annual plant is a native of the Mediterranean Basin, but it is familiar in other places where it was introduced and has become a noxious weed, such as in parts of North America and southern Australia with similar climates.

== Description ==
This is a spiny, glandular, woolly plant, which often seems to be covered in spiders' webs, due to its fine tangled fibers. It has a pale stem which may reach a meter in height, and rigid, pointed, very spiny leaves. The flower head has many long, sharp phyllaries that can be up to several centimeters long, and often bend backwards (recurved). The disc florets are bright yellow. One plant can produce many stems which mat together due to their spininess and form a small thicket. The fruit is an achene about half a centimeter long with many rigid pappus scales.

== Invasive species in Australia ==
In Australia the plant is commonly regarded as a pasture weed because it competes with desired plants such as pasture or crops, seeds and bracts become embedded in wool which results in lower returns to farmers, and dense infestations restrict stock access and are difficult to walk through. It is generally not considered a weed in much of Europe.

=== Population biology ===
Seed germination is stimulated by red light. This means that germination is most likely in areas with little vegetation or pasture cover, e.g. when an area has been overgrazed. Seeds also require specific temperature cues and water, which means that most seeds germinate in Autumn (Fall). There are more C. lanatus seeds in the soil in Australian pastures than in similar French pastures, probably because there are more seed predators capable of removing seeds of this size in France than in Australia. Many C. lanatus seeds are dormant (will not germinate, even in ideal conditions), and seedbanks decrease by approximately 70-74% per year if no seed is added.

=== Weed management ===
This plant can be controlled using a range of herbicides. Several biological control options have been investigated for Australia, including classical biological control, although finding an insect or fungus that will not also attack safflower has proven difficult. A rosette-feeding fly Botanophila turcica shows some promise. The potential for using pathogens already present in Australia has also been investigated.

In pastures, good pasture cover in Autumn will reduce germination, suggesting that pastures should be managed to reduce grazing pressure over summer, and increase the cover from summer-growing perennial grasses. Population models suggest that strategic grazing may be one of the most effective long-term control options for infested pastures.
