= Konstantin Efetov =

Ukrainian biologist and biochemist

Konstantin Aleksandrovich Efetov
- Костянтин Єфетов
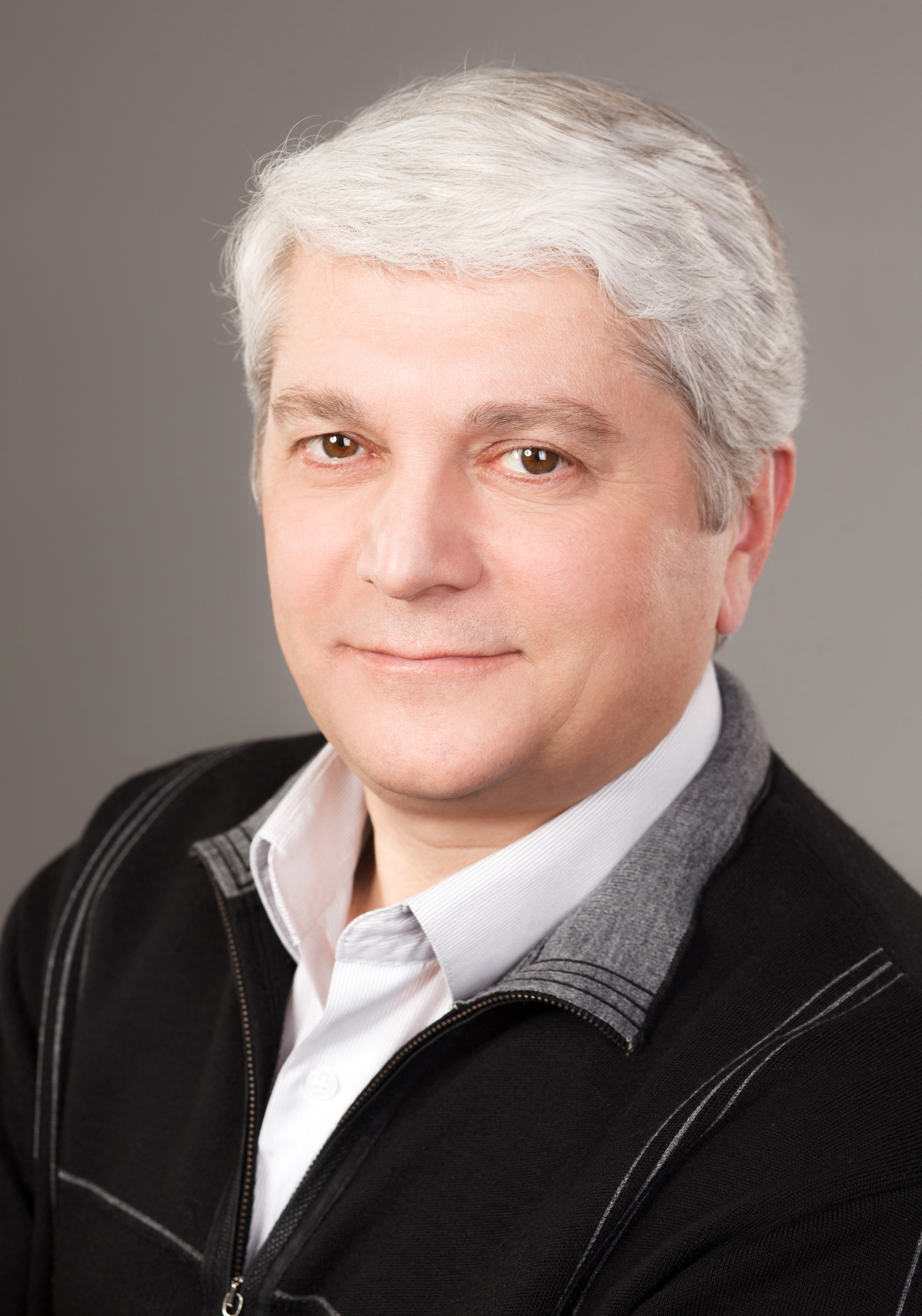
- Konstantin Efetov (2015)
- Born: 18 July 1958 (age 68); Simferopol, Ukrainian SSR, Soviet Union
- Education: Crimea State Medical Institute
- Known for: Monoclonal immunosystematics
- Scientific career
- Fields: Biology, biochemistry, entomology
- Workplaces: Crimea State Medical University
- Doctoral advisor: German Troitsky

Konstantin Aleksandrovich Efetov (Ukrainian: Костянти́н Олекса́ндрович Єфе́тов; Russian: Константи́н Алекса́ндрович Ефе́тов; born 18 July 1958) is a Ukrainian biologist and biochemist, Honored Scientist of Ukraine, Academician of the Russian Academy of Natural History, Professor, Dr. Biol. Sci., Head of the Department of Biological Chemistry and Laboratory of Biotechnology of the Crimea State Medical University.

== Biography ==
Efetov was born in Simferopol on 18 July 1958. In 1975, having graduated from school with Gold Medal, he entered the Crimea Medical Institute and graduated from it magna cum laude (with honours) in 1981. After completion of his postgraduate course, in 1986 he became Philosophy Doctor of Medicine having defended his PhD thesis "Stability of Conformation of Immunoglobulins G at Norm and Chronic Lymphoid Leukaemia" (Efetov's Scientific Adviser was Professor G. V. Troitsky, the Corresponding Member of the Academy of Sciences of Ukraine, the Honored Scientist of Ukraine). In 1986, Efetov was among the founders of the Hybridoma Laboratory at CSMU. Since 1986, he worked as the senior, chief, and then top research scientific researcher at CSMU; since 1992, he has been working as the Head of the Laboratory of Biotechnology. In 1994, he became Doctor of Biological Sciences having defended his doctoral thesis "A Study of Immunoglobulins at Norm and Pathology with Use of Monoclonal Antibodies and Spectral Methods", in which, for the first time, he applied insect peptides for investigation of human proteins. Since 1995, Efetov is Professor and since 1999, he is the Head of the Department of Biological Chemistry of the Crimea State Medical University.

== Scientific activities ==
Efetov's major scientific interests are focused on molecular immunology, evolutionary biology, and biosystematics. Using spectral methods, he has demonstrated the existence of changes in the conformation of human immunoglobulins at malignant tumors. He was the first to suggest using the insect proteins and peptides as molecule probes for investigation of the human proteins at norm and pathology. Efetov has established a new scientific approach – monoclonal immunosystematics that makes it possible to evaluate evolutionary relationships between the biological species through studying their proteins with use of monoclonal antibodies.

He has described one subfamily, 7 new genera and 11 subgenera of living organisms, discovered and described 37 new biological species inhabiting Japan, Korea, Indonesia, China, Taiwan, Vietnam, Myanmar (Burma), New Zealand, India, Russia, Kyrgyzstan, Turkmenistan, Afghanistan, Ukraine and Hungary. Many times the results of his studies have been represented at international congresses and symposia held in different countries of Europe. In 2004, he initiated and hosted the International Symposium "Biology, Phylogeny, Molecular Biology, and Genetics of Zygaenidae" at the Crimean State Medical University.

He is the author of 665 scientific works that include over 25 monographs and 18 patents for inventions. His studies have been quoted in publications of scientists of 65 countries in 12 languages (including English, Hungarian, Spanish, Italian, German, French, and Japanese). He has trained one Doctor of Science and 5 Philosophy Doctors; currently (2023) he is supervising the writing of 3 dissertations.

== Awards and titles ==
He is the Academician of the Crimean Academy of Science (since 2002), the Honored Scientist of Ukraine (since 2004), the Chairman of the Crimean Biochemical Society (since 2006), the Member of the Central Council of the Ukrainian Biochemical Society (since 2006), the Vice President of the Junior Academy of Science of Crimea (since 1997), the Member of the Council of the European Lepidopterological Society (2005–2009), a Member of the Union of the Russian, Ukrainian and Belarusian Writers of Autonomous Republic of Crimea.

For his achievements in the fields of biology and medicine, K. A. Efetov is awarded with four gold medals: "One Thousand Great Scientists" (Great Britain, 2002), "Outstanding Europeans of the 21st Century" (Great Britain, 2003), "International Scientist of the Year" (Great Britain, 2003), "American Medal of Honor" (USA, 2004). He is represented in the biographical reference books "Contemporary Who’s Who" (USA) and "Outstanding Europeans of the 21st Century" (Great Britain). In honour of K. A. Efetov, scientists of Austria, France, Ukraine, and Russia named 3 biological species (Etroga efetovi Richter, 1994; Zygaenoprocris efetovi Mollet et Tarmann, 2007; Chrysartona efetovi Parshkova, 2007) and a subgenus of living organisms (Efetovia Mollet, 2001).

He is the Laureate of the State Prize of Republic of Crimea (1996), the Laureate of the Prize of the Council of Ministers of Autonomous Republic of Crimea (2000), the Laureate of the Prize of Autonomous Republic of Crimea (2008). He is awarded with the Honorary Diplomas of the Presidium of the Supreme Council of Autonomous Republic of Crimea (1998), the Council of Ministers of Autonomous Republic of Crimea (1998, 2002), and the Ministry of Public Health of Ukraine (1998).

He is a member of the editorial boards of the scientific journals "Tavricheskiy Mediko-biologicheskiy Vestnik" (Ukraine) and "Entomologist’s Gazette" (Great Britain), the scientific Readers "Problems, Achievements and Prospects of Development of Life Sciences and Practical Public Health (Transactions of the Crimean State Medical University)" and "The Marine Doctor’s Bulletin".

== Other facts ==
He has published several books ("A Shocking Secret of the Sistine Chapel", "Das Schockierende Geheimnis der Sixtinischen Kapelle" and "Old Testament’s Secret of the Rib of Adam") and articles (in the journals "Chemistry and Life", "Asclepius", "Discoveries and Hypotheses", "Kontakto") devoted to his unusual hypotheses at the crossroads of medicine, art and history. In particular, the author asserts that on Michelangelo’s frescoes in the Sistine Chapel there are several "invisible" images: if examined, they radically change the spectator's ideas about the specific meaning implanted into these frescoes by their creator. Another hypothesis is dedicated to the interpretation of the biblical myth about the creation of woman from Adam's rib: the author sees parallels between the components of this myth and the biochemical mechanism of the formation of female sex hormones. These hypotheses did obtain wide response in the Internet and even were used for quizzes in the world championship "What? Where? When?".

He has published four poetic collections: "Wings’ Stroke", "The Black-and-White Square", "The life of the ‘Bats’" and "The Wells of Memory". He is also the scripter of hymn, the author of flag and the co-author of coat of arms of the Crimea State Medical University.

== Books published ==
- Efetov, K. A.; Budashkin, Yu. I. (1990). Высшие разноусые чешуекрылые Крыма. [The Lepidoptera of the Crimea.] (in Russian). Simferopol: Tavriya. ISBN 978-5-7780-0171-8. Archived from the original on 24 August 2007.
- Murina, V. V.; Stepanyants, S. D.; Dekhtyar, M. M.; … Efetov, K. A.; et al. (1994). Shcherbak, M. M. (ed.). Червона книга України. Тваринний світ. [The Red Data Book of Ukraine. The Animal World.] (in Ukrainian). Kyiv: Ukrainska Entsiklopediya. ISBN 978-5-88500-064-2.
- Prusakov, A. A.; Kozlov, E. D.; Yena, V. G.; Efetov, K. A.; Dulitsky, A. I. (1999). Крым: книга рекордов. [Crimea: the Book of Records.] (in Russian). Simferopol: Sonat. ISBN 978-966-7347-11-6. Archived from the original on 18 October 2009.
- Efetov, K. A.; Tarmann, G. M. (1999). Forester Moths. The genera Theresimima Strand, 1917, Rhagades Wallengren, 1863, Jordanita Verity, 1946, and Adscita Retzius, 1783 (Lepidoptera: Zygaenidae, Procridinae). Stenstrup (Denmark): Apollo Books. ISBN 978-87-88757-23-1.
- Efetov, K. A. (2001). A Review of the Western Palaearctic Procridinae (Lepidoptera: Zygaenidae). Simferopol: CSMU Press. ISBN 978-966-7348-07-6.
- Efetov, K. A.; Tremewan, W. G.; Tarmann, G. M.; et al. (2003). Efetov, K. A.; Tremewan, W. G.; Tarmann, G. M. (eds.). Proceedings of the 7th International Symposium on Zygaenidae (Lepidoptera) (Innsbruck, Austria, September 2000. Simferopol: CSMU Press. ISBN 978-966-7348-21-2.
- Efetov, K. A. (2004). Forester and Burnet Moths (Lepidoptera: Zygaenidae). The genera Theresimima Strand, 1917, Rhagades Wallengren, 1863, Zygaenoprocris Hampson, 1900, Adscita Retzius, 1783, Jordanita Verity, 1946 (Procridinae), and Zygaena Fabricius, 1775 (Zygaeninae). Simferopol: CSMU Press. ISBN 978-966-7348-23-6.
- Kaminskaya, G. A.; Efetov, K. A. (2005). Биологическая химия. Руководство к лабораторным занятиям. [Biological Chemistry. Laboratory Manual.] (in Russian). Simferopol: CSMU Press. ISBN 978-966-7348-21-2.
- Belyayev, E. A.; Viydalepp, I. R.; Glushchenko, Yu. N.; Dubatolov, V. V.; Efetov, K. A.; et al. (2005). Ler, P. A. (ed.). Определитель насекомых Дальнего Востока России. Т. V. Ручейники и чешуекрылые [Key to the Insects of Russian Far East. Vol. V. Trichoptera and Lepidoptera.] (in Russian). Vladivostok: Dal’nauka. ISBN 978-5-8044-0597-8.
- Efetov, K. A. (2005). The Zygaenidae (Lepidoptera) of the Crimea and Other Regions of Eurasia (in English and Russian). Simferopol: CSMU Press. ISBN 978-966-7348-10-6.
- Efetov, K. A. (2006). Шокирующая тайна Сикстинской капеллы. [A Shocking Secret of the Sistine Chapel.] (in Russian). Simferopol: CSMU Press. ISBN 978-966-2969-00-9.
- Babanin, A. A.; Kaladze, N. N.; Efetov, K. A. (2006). Профессора Крымского Государственного Медицинского Университета им. С. И. Георгиевского. [The Professors of the Crimea State Medical University.] (in Russian). Yevpatoriya: Yevpatoriya Information and Advertizing Publishing Center named after the 50th Anniversary of Victory. ISBN 978-966-572-045-4.
- Efetov, K. A. (2007). Das Schockierende Geheimnis der Sixtinischen Kapelle [A Shocking Secret of the Sistine Chapel.] (in German). Simferopol: CSMU Press. ISBN 978-966-2969-11-5.
- Efetov, K. A. (2006). Концепция системы русских и украинских зоологических названий. [A Concept of the System of Russian and Ukrainian Zoological Names.] (in Russian). Simferopol: CSMU Press. ISBN 978-966-2969-12-2.
- Belousov, I. A.; Bibina, K. B.; Gazarian, S. V.; … Efetov, K. A.; et al. (2007) [2008]. Zamotaylov, A. S. (ed.). Красная книга Краснодарского края (животные). [The Red Data Book of Krasnodar Territory (Animals).] (in Russian) (Second ed.). Krasnodar: Center of Informational and Economic Development of Press. ISBN 978-5-91111-006-2. OCLC 475585207.
- Efetov, K. A.; Tarmann, G. M. (2008). Chrysartona Swinhoe, 1892 (Lepidoptera: Zygaenidae, Procridinae). Simferopol: CSMU Press. ISBN 978-966-7348-23-6.
- Anikin, V. V.; Baryshnikova, S. V.; Belyayev, E. A.; … Efetov, K. A.; et al. (2008). Sinev, S. Yu. (ed.). Каталог чешуекрылых (Lepidoptera) России [Catalogue of the Lepidoptera of Russia.] (in Russian) (Second ed.). St. Petersburg: KMK Scientific Press. ISBN 978-5-87317-457-7.
- Efetov, K. A. (2008). Old Testament's Secret of the Rib of Adam. Simferopol: CSMU Press. ISBN 978-966-2969-17-7.
- Efetov, K. A. (2008). Ветхозаветная тайна ребра Адама. [Old Testament’s Secret of the Rib of Adam.] (in Russian). Simferopol: CSMU Press. ISBN 978-966-2969-18-4.

== Sources and external links ==
- (in Russian) K. A. Efetov in the Gallery of Lepidopterists of Russia (retrieved October 14, 2009)
- (in Russian) Information about K. A. Efetov on the CSMU official site (retrieved October 14, 2009)
- (in Russian) (written by K. A. Efetov and Yu. I. Budashkin; retrieved October 14, 2009)
- (in Russian) Section "The Insects (of the Crimea)", written by K. A. Efetov (from "Crimea: the Book of Records"; retrieved October 14, 2009)
- A shocking secret of the Sistine Chapel, written by K. A. Efetov (from the book "Old Testament’s Secret of the Rib of Adam"; retrieved October 14, 2010)
