= V. I. Vernadsky Crimean Federal University =

- Крымский федеральный университет имени В.И. Вернадского
- Motto: Nosce te ipsum (Latin)
- Motto in English: Know thyself
- Type: Federal university
- Established: 2014
- Rector: Vladimir Kuryanov
- Students: 35000
- Location: 4, Akademika Vernadskogo Avenue, Simferopol, Crimea; 44°56′11″N 34°08′03″E
- Website: http://www.eng.cfuv.ru Building details
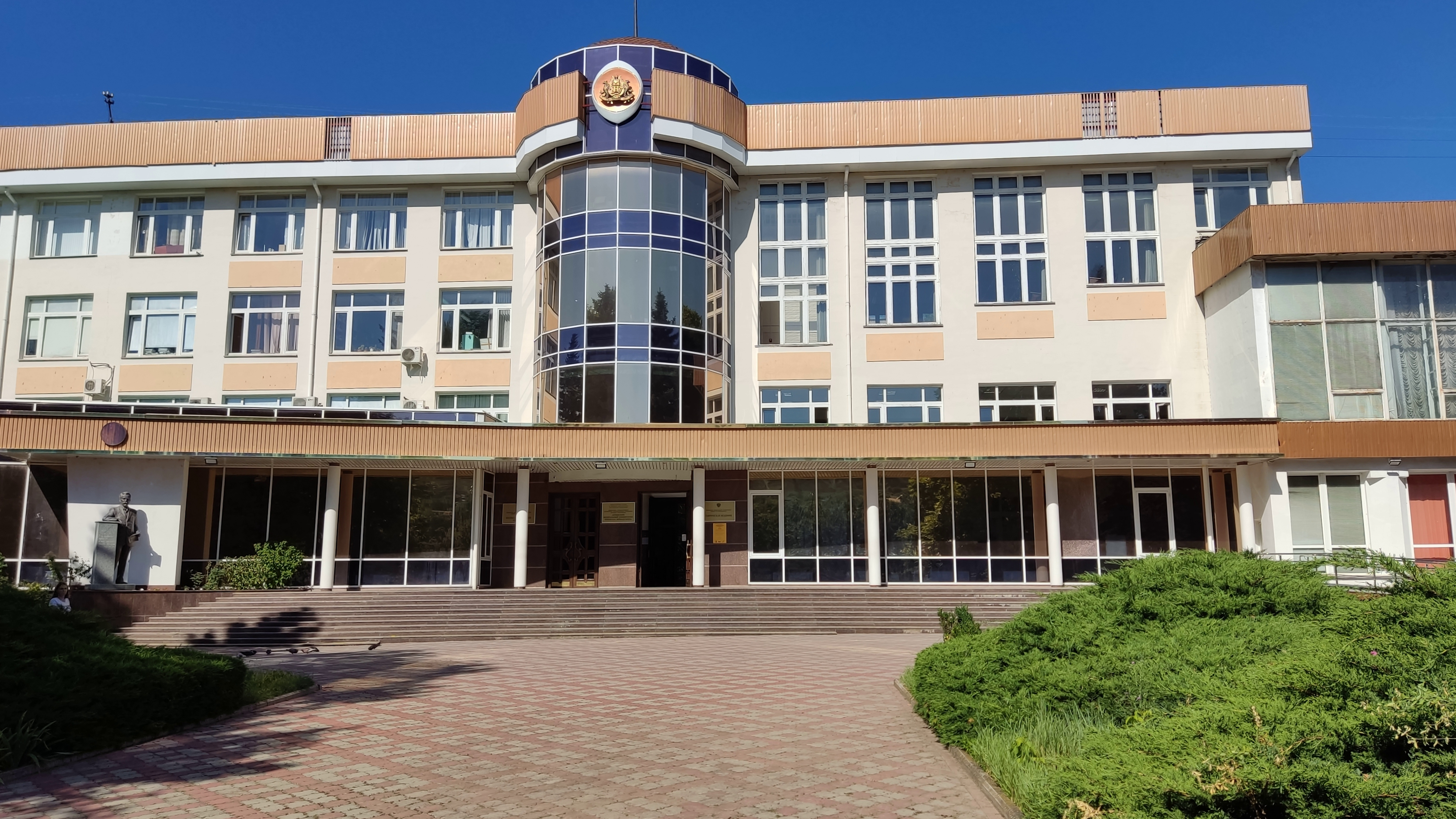

V. I. Vernadsky Crimean Federal University is a public university located in Simferopol, Crimea, created in 2014 on the basis of V. I. Vernadsky Taurida National University. It consists of a network of research and production facilities, which has more than 7,000 staff and over 32,000 students, including about 3,000 international students from 54 countries.

The university was named after the academician Vladimir Vernadsky. Crimea Federal University has 23 academic and non-academic units and 12 branches located across Crimea, including 10 academies and institutes, 7 colleges, 11 branches, 11 research institutions and centers.

== History ==
The university began its history from the Decree of the Crimean Territorial Government 3 September 1918 "On the Establishment of the Taurida University".

During the development of Crimea as a health resort, it was decided in 1930 to organize higher medical school here. The opening of the Crimean Medical Institute took place on 1 April 1931.

The 100th anniversary of the Crimean Federal University was on 14 October 2018.

The development of new campuses of the Crimean Federal University began in August 2019.

== Parks ==
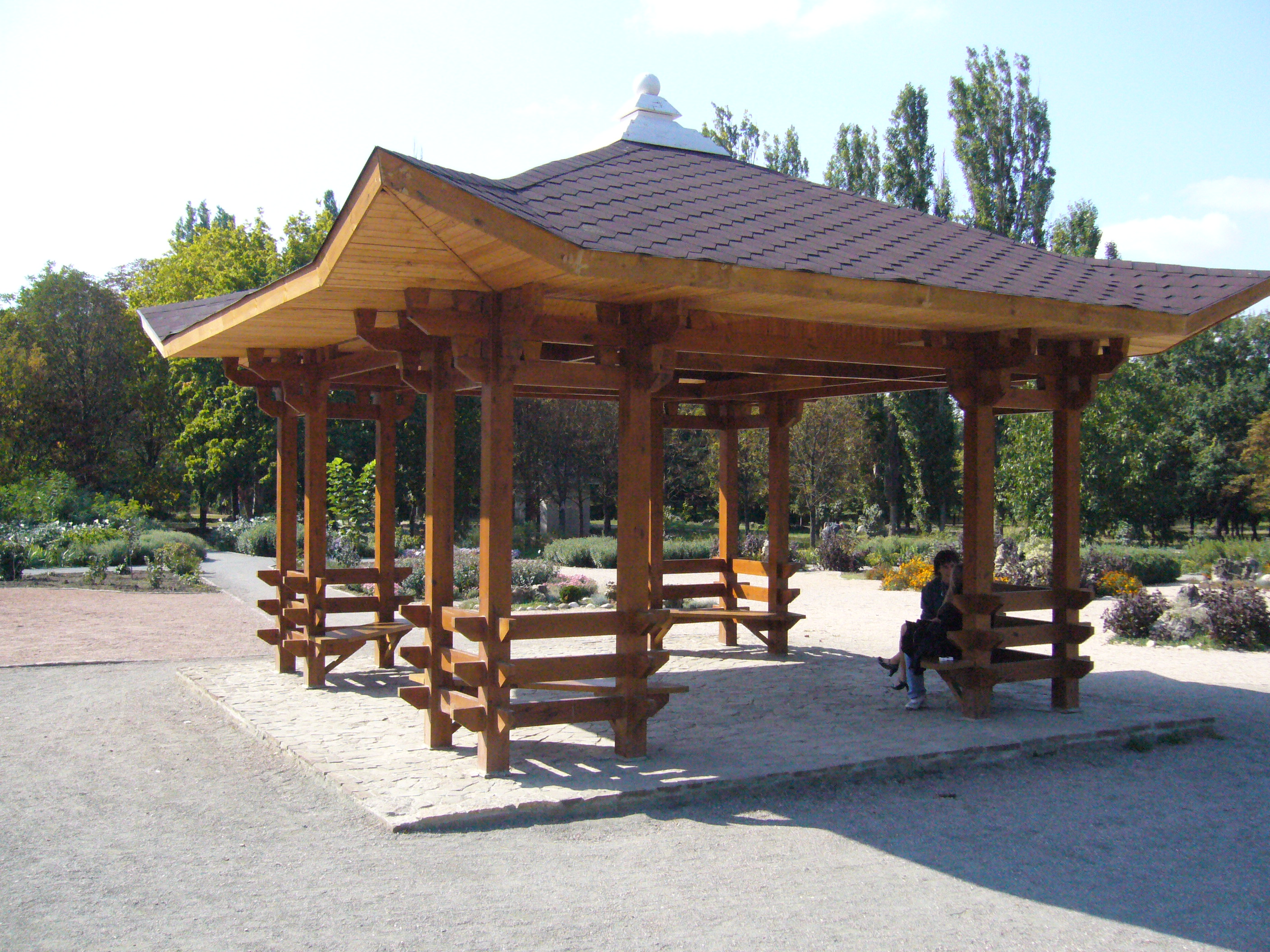
Place of leisure in University Park

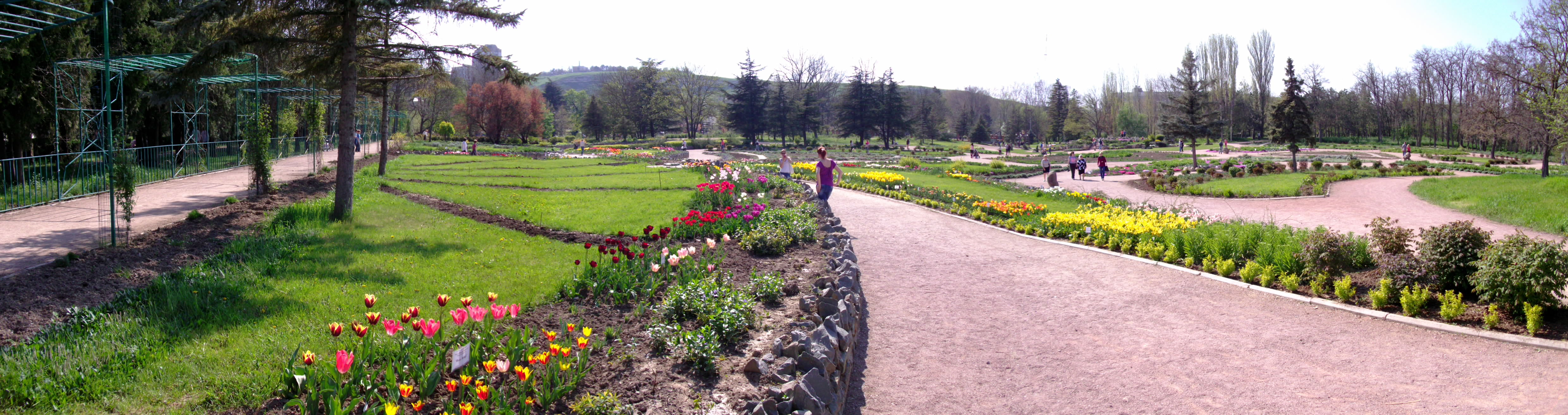
It's Spring in the Botanic Garden

The university parks are 103,78-acre (42 he) parkland area in the south of the city, near Taurida Academy. The park is open to the public during daylight hours.

Vorontsov house is located in the park university. The house residence Mikhail Vorontsov.

On the territory of the Botanic garden and in the campus of the Taurida Academy is a library of science.

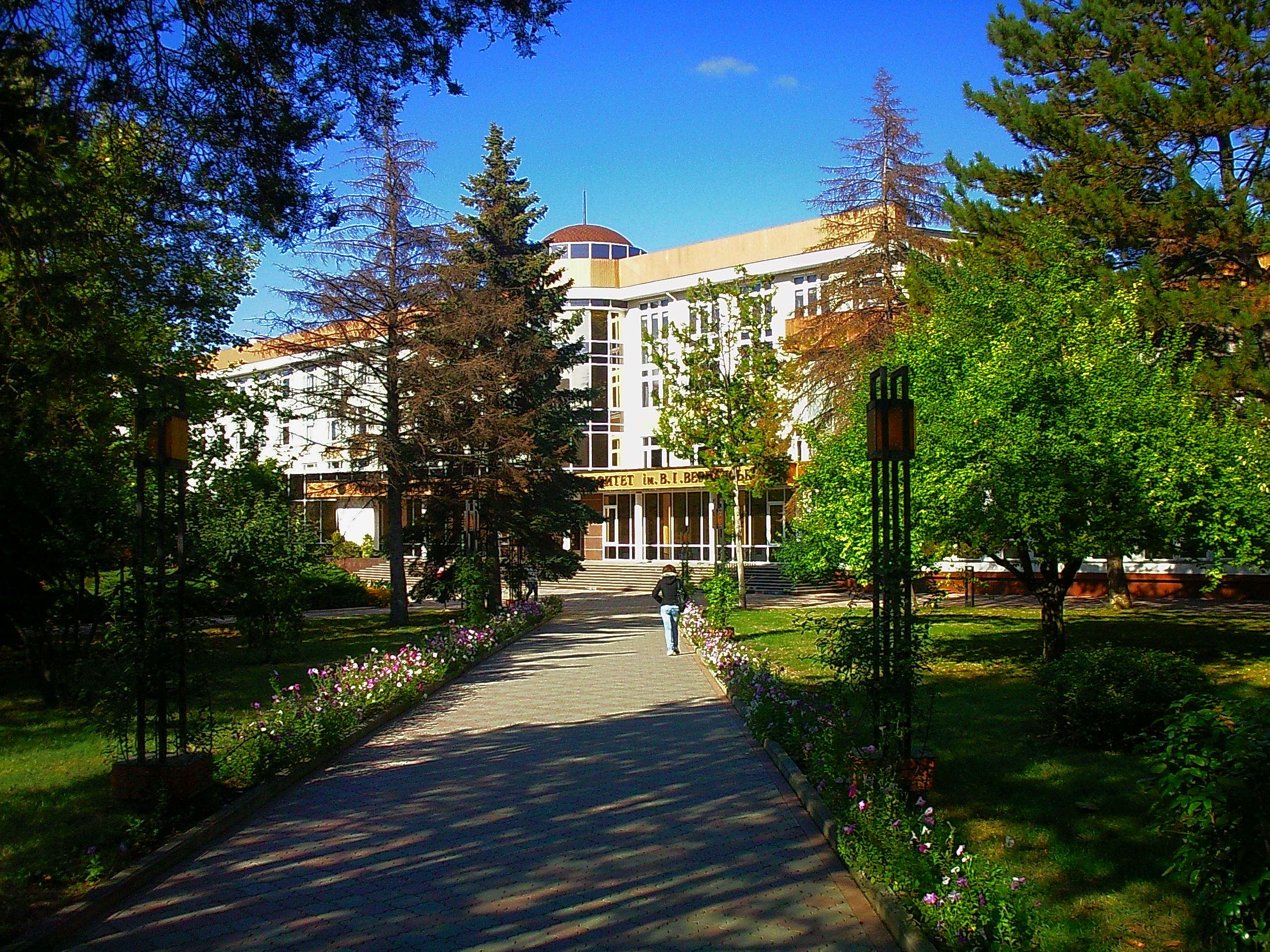
Campus of Taurida Academy and Institute Physics and Technology

== Research ==
Scientists from Vernadsky Crimean Federal University, together with their colleagues from the and Forestry Mechanization, have developed and synthesized a new plant protection compound based on the DNA of the gypsy moth.

Scientists from Vernadsky Crimean Federal University, together with their colleagues from the and Institute Physics and Technology, have developed magnetic sensors to detect metal defects.

Scientists of the Crimean Federal University have developed an inhaled vaccine against - COVID-19.

== Notable faculty ==
- Igor Tamm
- Vladimir Obruchev
- Nikolay Mitrofanovich Krylov
- Abram Ioffe
- Boris Grekov
- Vladimir Vernadsky

== Review ==
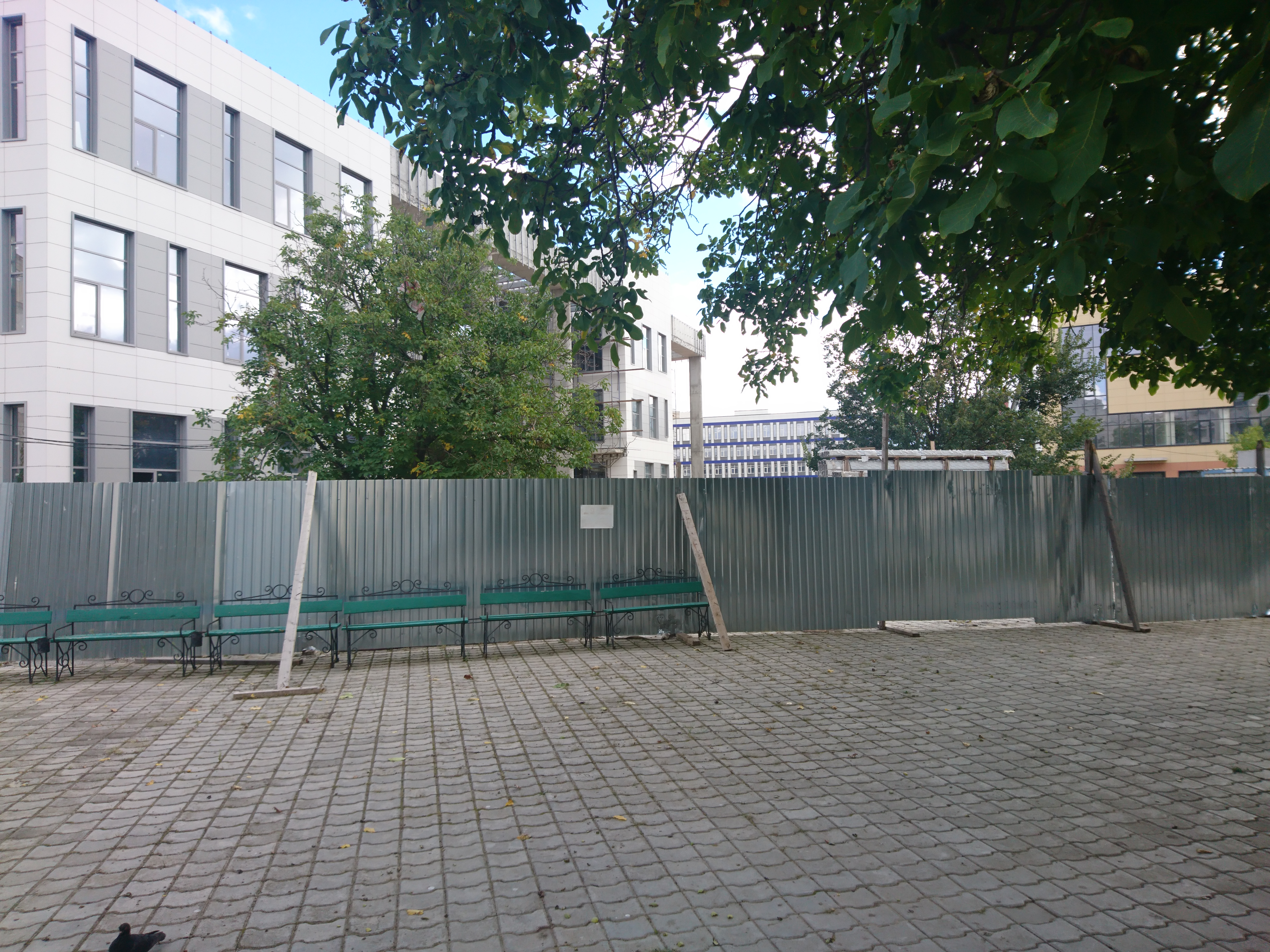
Development of new campuses of the Crimean Federal University
