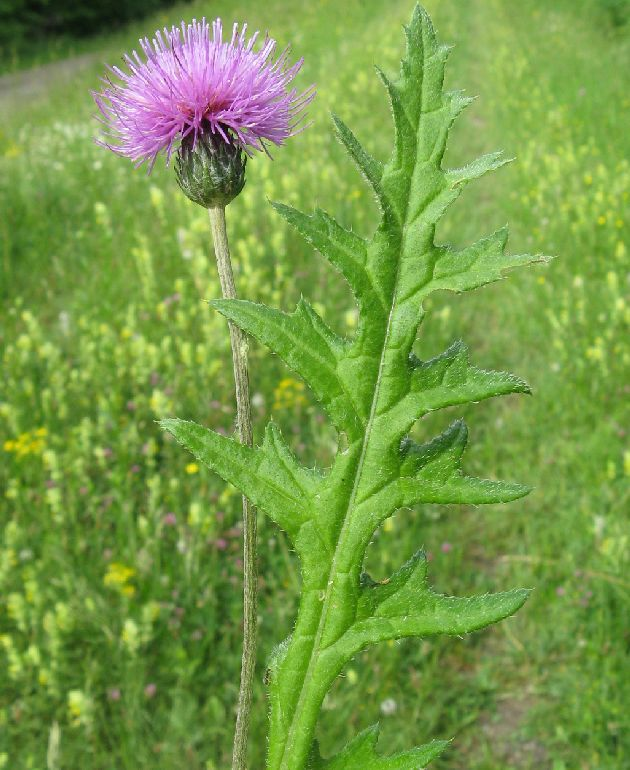

Scientific classification
- Kingdom: Plantae
- Clade: Tracheophytes
- Clade: Angiosperms
- Clade: Eudicots
- Clade: Asterids
- Order: Asterales
- Family: Asteraceae
- Genus: Cirsium
- Species: C. tuberosum

Binomial name
- Cirsium tuberosum (L.) All.

Synonyms
- List: Carduus tuberosus L.; Cnicus tuberosus (L.) Roth; Cynara tuberosa (L.) Stokes; Ixine tuberosa (L.) Hill; Serratula tuberosa (L.) Neck.; Carduus bulbosus Lam.; Carduus gouanii Steud.; Carduus medius Steud.; Carduus pedemontanus Pers.; Cirsium anglicum var. longicaule Willk.; Cirsium × brunneri A.Braun; Cirsium bulbosum DC.; Cirsium colmeroi Sennen & Pau; Cirsium inerme G.Don; Cirsium salvadori Sennen; Cirsium salvadoris Sennen & Pau; Cirsium tuberosum subsp. bulbosum (Lam.) Sudre; Cirsium tuberosum proles bulbosum (Lam.) Rouy; Cirsium tuberosum var. yvesii Briq. & Cavill.; Cnicus pedemontanus Willd.

= Cirsium tuberosum =

Species of thistle

Cirsium tuberosum, the tuberous thistle, is a species of flowering plant in the family Asteraceae native to Europe.

== Etymology ==
The specific epithet tuberosum refers to the spindle-shaped, tuberous roots.

== Distribution and habitat ==
It is native to France, Germany, Great Britain, Italy, the Balkan Peninsula, Portugal, Spain, Switzerland, and Austria, where it grows in wet meadows, semi-arid grasslands, along the edges of ditches or in sparse shrub communities, preferably on alkaline soils.
