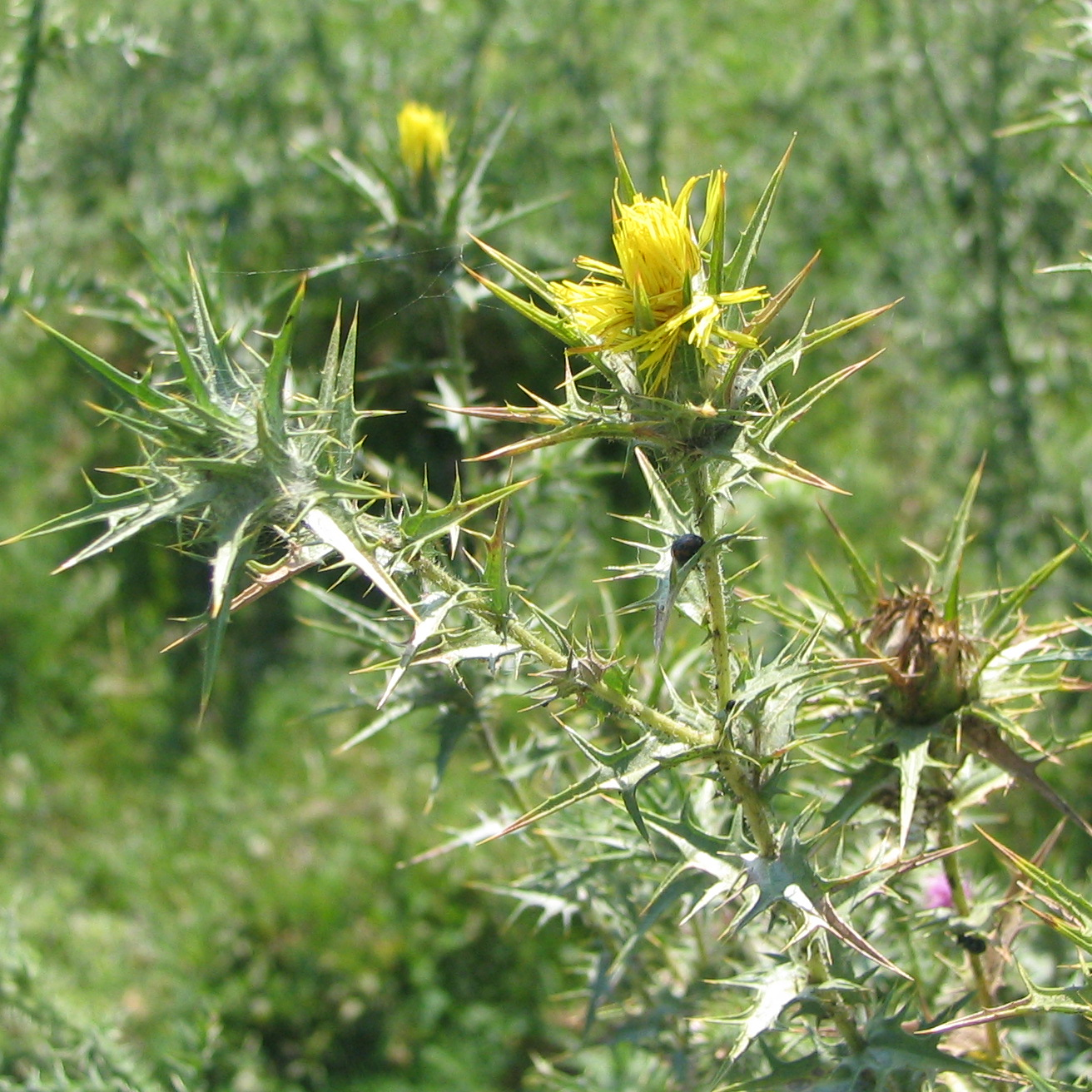
- Saffron thistle, Carthamus lanatus

Scientific classification
- Kingdom: Plantae
- Clade: Embryophytes
- Clade: Tracheophytes
- Clade: Spermatophytes
- Clade: Angiosperms
- Clade: Eudicots
- Clade: Asterids
- Order: Asterales
- Family: Asteraceae
- Subfamily: Carduoideae
- Tribe: Cardueae
- Subtribe: Centaureinae
- Genus: Carthamus; L.

Type species
- Carthamus tinctorius L.

Synonyms
- Carthamoides Vaill.; Kentrophyllum Neck. ex DC.; Carthamus sect. Eucarthamus Baill.; Durandoa Pomel

= Carthamus =

Distaff thistles

Genus of flowering plants

The genus Carthamus, the distaff thistles, includes plants in the family Asteraceae. The group is native to Europe, North Africa, and parts of Asia. The flower has been used since ancient times in the Philippines, which it has been called kasubha by the Tagalog people.

The best known species is the safflower (Carthamus tinctorius).

Species

- Carthamus arborescens L.
- Carthamus atractyloides (Pomel) Greuter
- Carthamus balearicus (J.J.Rodr.) Greuter
- Carthamus boissieri Halácsy
- Carthamus caeruleus L.
- Carthamus calvus (Boiss. & Reut.) Batt.
- Carthamus carduncellus L.
- Carthamus carthamoides (Pomel) Batt.
- Carthamus catrouxii (Emb. ex Maire) Greuter
- Carthamus cespitosus (Batt.) Greuter
- Carthamus chouletteanus (Pomel) Greuter
- Carthamus creticus L.
- Carthamus curdicus Hanelt
- Carthamus dentatus Vahl
- Carthamus dianius (Webb) Coincy
- Carthamus duvauxii (Batt. & Trab.) Prain
- Carthamus eriocephalus (Boiss.) Greuter
- Carthamus flavescens Willd.
- Carthamus fruticosus Maire
- Carthamus glaucus M.Bieb.
- Carthamus gypsicola Iljin
- Carthamus helenioides Desf.
- Carthamus hispanicus (Boiss. ex DC.) Sch.Bip.
- Carthamus ilicifolius (Pomel) Greuter
- Carthamus lanatus L.
- Carthamus leucocaulos Sm.
- Carthamus lucens (Ball) Greuter
- Carthamus mareoticus Delile
- Carthamus matritensis (Pau) Greuter
- Carthamus mitissimus L.
- Carthamus multifidus Desf.
- Carthamus nitidus Boiss.
- Carthamus oxyacantha M.Bieb.
- Carthamus pectinatus Desf.
- Carthamus persicus Desf. ex Willd.
- Carthamus pinnatus Desf.
- Carthamus plumosus (Pomel) Greuter
- Carthamus pomelianus (Batt.) Batt.
- Carthamus reboudianus (Batt.) Prain
- Carthamus rechingeri P.H.Davis
- Carthamus rhaponticoides (Pomel) Greuter
- Carthamus riphaeus Font Quer & Pau
- Carthamus strictus (Pomel) Batt.
- Carthamus tamamschjanae Gabrieljan
- Carthamus tenuis (Boiss. & Blanche) Bornm.
- Carthamus tinctorius L.
- Carthamus turkestanicus Popov
