= Josef Dostál (botanist) =

Czech botanist, pteridologist, conservationist, climber, hiker and university teacher

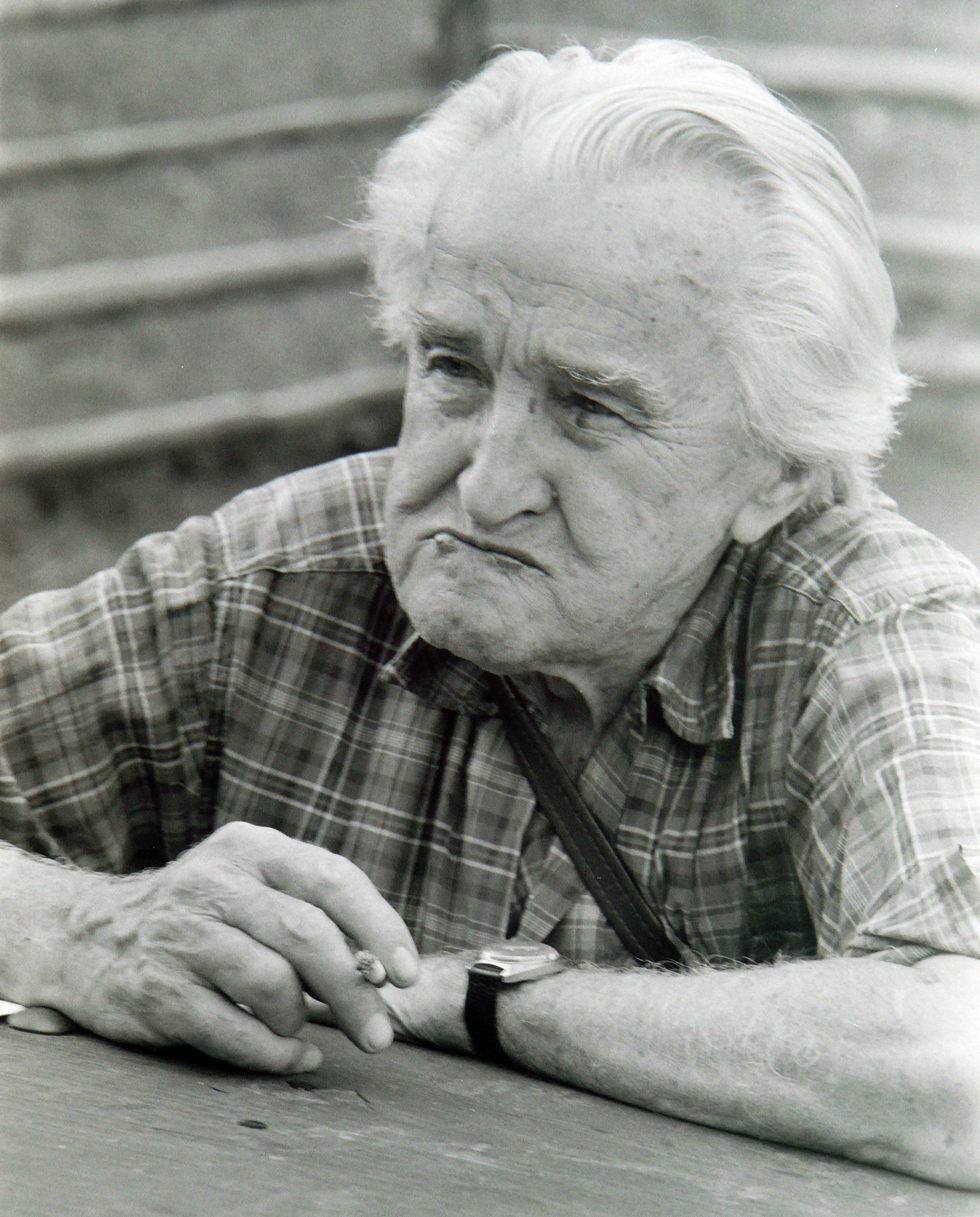
- Born: 20 December 1903; Prague
- Died: 11 May 1999 (aged 95); Prague
- Scientific career
- Fields: botany, pteridology, taxonomy conservation
- Author abbrev. (botany): Dostál

Josef Dostál (20 December 1903 – 11 May 1999) was a Czech botanist, pteridologist, conservationist, climber, hiker and university teacher. He was professor of botany at the Charles University in Prague. He was the founder of the modern Czech scientific taxonomy of higher plants, working mainly with morphology of higher plants found in Czechoslovakia.

== Career ==
Josef Dostál was born in 1903 in Prague. After graduation from grammar school he was admitted to the Faculty of Science of the Charles University and after graduating worked there as an assistant. During the period of closure of the universities in the years 1939 to 1945 he engaged in research on the botany of Bohemia and Moravia. In 1949 he qualified as docent (associate professor) of Botany, and five years later he was appointed full professor in the Faculty of Science of the Charles University. In 1963 because of his opinions and attitudes he was forced to retire from Prague and moved to Olomouc where he worked for several years at Palacky University.

As a university lecturer and professor he introduced the first lectures on paleophytogeography and evolutionary morphology. Professor Dostál was the author or co-author of numerous scientific studies in the field of botany and botanical and morphological terminology and also made a start on the geographical classification of the vegetation of Czechoslovakia. He prepared the Czech translation of nomenclature rules, worked on the Dictionary of Standard Czech and managed as a technical editor of works in the natural science section of an agricultural encyclopedia.

Professor Dostál published a number of professional, scientific and popular-scientific works in many fields of botany. His professional activities include higher plant systematics, taxonomy, floristics, morphology, phytosociology, phytogeography, Czechoslovak vegetation, dendrology, conservation, genetics and more. His major work was "Flora of Czechoslovakia" and "Key to the complete flora of Czechoslovakia." Professor Dostál 's diligence, his talent and vitality achieved international scientific recognition. He was a regional adviser to Flora Europea and prepared the material on ferns for an edition of Hegi's Flora von Mittel-Europa. He took an active part in many international congresses and meetings (England, Spain, Italy, Greece, Crete, Cyprus, Turkey and Egypt). He was a member of the Czech, Slovak and Bulgarian Botanical Societies.

At home and abroad he published in professional and popular botanical journals, lectured to members of the Czech Botanical Society and similar societies abroad. He was also a longtime member of the Czech Union for Nature Conservation. He died 11 May 1999 in Prague.

== Honours ==
In 1998 he received the Minister of the Environment Award for his lifetime achievement in the field of botany

=== Taxa named in his honour ===
- (Caryophyllaceae) Dianthus dostalii Novak
- (Plantaginaceae) Plantago dostalii Domin
- (Rosaceae) Alchemilla dostalii Plocek

== Works ==
- Květena ČSR I (Flora of Czechoslovakia I)
- Květena ČSR II (Flora of Czechoslovakia II)
- Klíč k úplné květeně ČSR (Key for the Flora of Czechoslovakia)
