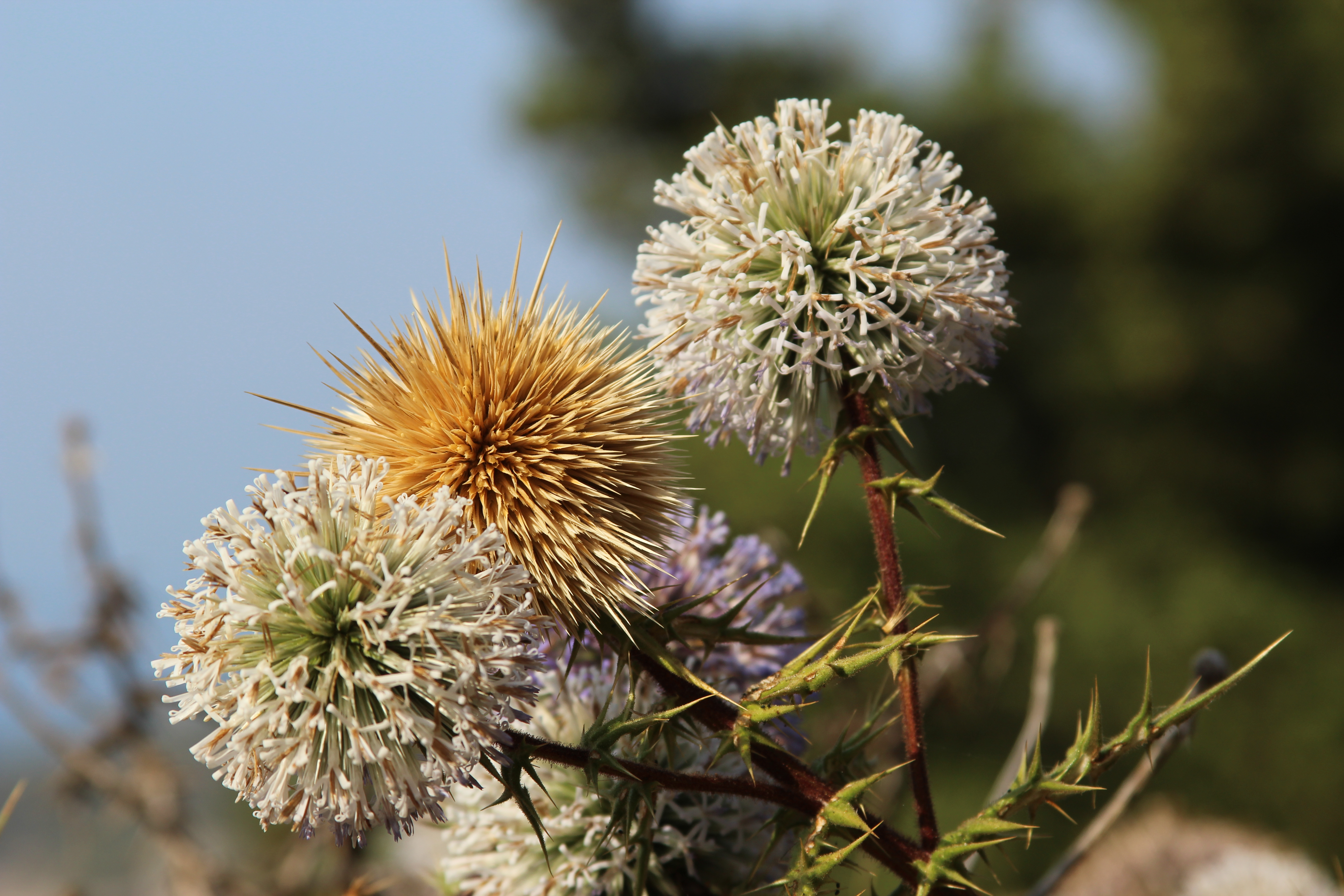

Scientific classification
- Kingdom: Plantae
- Clade: Tracheophytes
- Clade: Angiosperms
- Clade: Eudicots
- Clade: Asterids
- Order: Asterales
- Family: Asteraceae
- Genus: Echinops
- Species: E. spinosissimus

Binomial name
- Echinops spinosissimus Turra 1765 not Freyn 1895

Synonyms
- Synonymy: Echinops choetocephalus Pomel; Echinops creticus Boiss. & Heldr.; Echinops echinophorus Boiss.; Echinops glandulosus E.Weiss; Echinops spinosus L.; Echinops tunetanus Vahl ex Vitman; Echinops viscosus DC.; Echinops bithynicus Boiss., syn of subsp. bithynicus; Echinops bovei Boiss., syn of subsp. bovei; Echinops fontqueri Pau, syn of subsp. fontqueri; Echinops maurus Maire, syn of subsp. fontqueri; Echinops syriacus Boiss., syn of subsp. macrolepis; Echinops neumayeri Vis., syn of subsp. neumayeri

= Echinops spinosissimus =

Spiny Globe Thistle

Species of flowering plant

Echinops spinosissimus, the spiny globe thistle, is a European species of plant in the tribe Cardueae within the family Asteraceae. It is native to southeastern Europe (Sicily, Apulia, Greece, Albania, and the western Balkans), northern Africa, and southwest Asia as far east as Iran.

Echinops spinosissimus is a branching perennial herb up to 80 cm (2 feet) tall. Leaves are divided into narrow triangular lobes, each with a slender but hard spine at the tip. The plant produces nearly spherical flower heads containing many white or pale lavender disc florets but no ray florets.

Subspecies

- Echinops spinosissimus subsp. bithynicus (Boiss.) Greuter
- Echinops spinosissimus subsp. bovei (Boiss.) Greuter
- Echinops spinosissimus subsp. fontqueri (Pau) Greuter
- Echinops spinosissimus subsp. macrolepis (Boiss.) Greuter
- Echinops spinosissimus subsp. neumayeri (Vis.) Kožuharov
- Echinops spinosissimus subsp. spinosissimus
