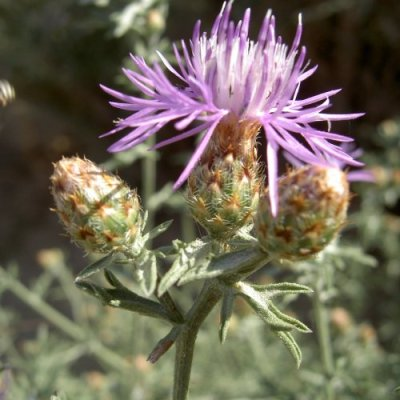

Scientific classification
- Kingdom: Plantae
- Clade: Tracheophytes
- Clade: Angiosperms
- Clade: Eudicots
- Clade: Asterids
- Order: Asterales
- Family: Asteraceae
- Genus: Centaurea
- Species: C. paniculata

Binomial name
- Centaurea paniculata L. 1753

= Centaurea paniculata =

Species of flowering plant

Centaurea paniculata, the Jersey knapweed, is a species of Centaurea found in France and northern Italy.
