= List of Centaurea species =

The following species in the flowering plant genus Centaurea are accepted by Plants of the World Online. Species in this genus hybridize readily.

- Centaurea acaulis L.
- Centaurea achaia Boiss. & Heldr.
- Centaurea achilleifolia Homrani-Bakali & Susanna
- Centaurea achtarovii Urum.
- Centaurea acicularis Sm.
- Centaurea acmophylla Boiss.
- Centaurea adamovicii Velen.
- Centaurea adscendens (Bartl.) Prodan
- Centaurea aegyptiaca L.
- Centaurea × aellenii Arènes
- Centaurea aeolica Guss. ex Lojac.
- Centaurea aetaliae (Sommier) Bég.
- Centaurea aetolica Phitos & T.Georgiadis
- Centaurea affinis Friv.
- Centaurea aggregata Fisch. & C.A.Mey. ex DC.
- Centaurea aguilellae Mateo & M.B.Crespo
- Centaurea ahverdovii Gabrieljan
- Centaurea ainetensis Boiss.
- Centaurea akamantis T.Georgiadis & Hadjik.
- Centaurea akmanii Yıld.
- Centaurea akroteriensis Gennaio & Q.G.Manni
- Centaurea aksoyi Hamzaoğlu & Budak
- Centaurea aladaghensis Wagenitz
- Centaurea alba L.
- Centaurea albertii Rexhepi
- Centaurea albofimbriata Stef. & T.Georgiev
- Centaurea albonitens Turrill
- Centaurea alexandrina Delile
- Centaurea alfonsoi Negaresh
- Centaurea ali-beyana Font Quer & Pau
- Centaurea alveicola Rech.f.
- Centaurea amadanensis Sch.Bip.
- Centaurea amaena Boiss. & Balansa
- Centaurea amanicola Hub.-Mor.
- Centaurea amanosensis M.Bona
- Centaurea ambigua Guss.
- Centaurea amblensis Graells
- Centaurea ammocyanus Boiss.
- Centaurea angelescui Grinţ.
- Centaurea antalyensis H.Duman & A.Duran
- Centaurea antennata Dufour
- Centaurea anthemifolia Hub.-Mor.
- Centaurea antiochia Boiss.
- Centaurea antitauri Hayek
- Centaurea aphrodisea Boiss.
- Centaurea aplolepa Moretti
- Centaurea appendicata Klokov
- Centaurea arachnoidea Viv.
- Centaurea ardabilica Ranjbar & Heydari
- Centaurea arenaria M.Bieb. ex Willd.
- Centaurea argentea L.
- Centaurea arifolia Boiss.
- Centaurea aristata Hoffmanns. & Link
- Centaurea armena Boiss.
- Centaurea arrigonii Greuter
- Centaurea ascalonica Bornm.
- Centaurea aspera L.
- Centaurea aspromontana Brullo, Scelsi & Spamp.
- Centaurea assadii Ranjbar & Negaresh
- Centaurea athoa DC.
- Centaurea atlantica Pomel
- Centaurea atlantis Maire & Weiller
- Centaurea atrata Willd.
- Centaurea atropurpurea Olivier
- Centaurea attica Nyman
- Centaurea aucheri (DC.) Wagenitz
- Centaurea austroanatolica Hub.-Mor.
- Centaurea austrobalcanica (Skokanová) Raus & Strid
- Centaurea avilae Pau
- Centaurea axillaris Willd.
- Centaurea aytugiana Bancheva, Kaya & Binzet
- Centaurea aziziana Rech.f.
- Centaurea babylonica (L.) L.
- Centaurea bachtiarica Hayek & Bornm.
- Centaurea baldaccii Degen
- Centaurea baseri Köse & Alan
- Centaurea bavegehensis Ranjbar & Negaresh
- Centaurea × beckiana Müllner
- Centaurea behen L.
- Centaurea benedicta (L.) L.
- Centaurea besseriana DC.
- Centaurea bethurica E.López & Devesa
- Centaurea × bilbilitana Pau
- Centaurea bimorpha Viv.
- Centaurea bingoelensis Behçet & İlçim
- Centaurea biokovensis Teyber
- Centaurea blancheana Mouterde
- Centaurea bofilliana Sennen ex Devesa & E.López
- Centaurea boissieri DC.
- Centaurea bojnordensis Ranjbar, Negaresh & Joharchi
- Centaurea bombycina Boiss. ex DC.
- Centaurea borjae Valdés Berm. & Rivas Goday
- Centaurea borysthenica Gruner
- Centaurea bourgaei Boiss.
- Centaurea bovina Velen.
- Centaurea breviceps Iljin
- Centaurea bruguieriana (DC.) Hand.-Mazz.
- Centaurea brulla Greuter
- Centaurea bugellensis (Soldano) Soldano
- Centaurea busambarensis Guss.
- Centaurea cadmea Boiss.
- Centaurea calabra G.Caruso, S.A.Giardina, Raimondo & Spadaro
- Centaurea calcitrapa L.
- Centaurea caliacrae Prodan
- Centaurea calocephala Willd.
- Centaurea calolepis Boiss.
- Centaurea camelorum Velen.
- Centaurea cankiriensis A.Duran & H.Duman
- Centaurea caprina Steven
- Centaurea carduiformis DC.
- Centaurea cariensiformis Hub.-Mor.
- Centaurea cariensis Boiss.
- Centaurea caroli-henrici Gabrieljan & Dittrich
- Centaurea carolipauana Fern.Casas & Susanna
- Centaurea carratracensis Lange
- Centaurea carystea Trigas & Constantin.
- Centaurea caspia Grossh.
- Centaurea cassia Boiss.
- Centaurea castellana Boiss. & Reut.
- Centaurea × castellano-manchensis Mateo & M.B.Crespo
- Centaurea castellanoides Talavera
- Centaurea cataonica Boiss. & Hausskn.
- Centaurea cavanillesiana Graells
- Centaurea × cavarae Guadagno ex Del Guacchio, Cennamo & P.Caputo
- Centaurea × ceballosii Fern.Casas
- Centaurea centauroides L.
- Centaurea × cephalariseptimae Fern.Casas & Susanna
- Centaurea ceratophylla Ten.
- Centaurea chalcidicea Hayek
- Centaurea charrelii Halácsy & Dörfl.
- Centaurea cheiranthifolia Willd.
- Centaurea cheirolepidoides Wagenitz
- Centaurea cheirolopha (Fenzl) Wagenitz
- Centaurea chrysantha Wagenitz
- Centaurea chrysocephala Phitos & T.Georgiadis
- Centaurea chrysolepis Vis.
- Centaurea cineraria L.
- Centaurea cithaeronea Phitos & Constantin.
- Centaurea citricolor Font Quer
- Centaurea clementei Boiss. ex DC.
- Centaurea codringtonii Rech.f.
- Centaurea codruensis Prodan
- Centaurea collina L.
- Centaurea × confusa H.J.Coste & Sennen
- Centaurea conocephala Bolle
- Centaurea consanguinea DC.
- Centaurea corcubionensis M.Laínz
- Centaurea cordubensis Font Quer
- Centaurea coronata Lamy
- Centaurea corymbosa Pourr.
- Centaurea costae Willk.
- Centaurea × costeana Sennen
- Centaurea coziensis Nyár.
- Centaurea cristata Bartl.
- Centaurea crithmifolia Vis.
- Centaurea crnogorica Rohlena
- Centaurea × croatica J.Wagner & Degen
- Centaurea cuneifolia Sm.
- Centaurea cuspidata Vis.
- Centaurea cyanoides Wahlenb.
- Centaurea cyanomorpha Stef. & T.Georgiev
- Centaurea cyanus L.
- Centaurea cylindrocephala Bornm.
- Centaurea cyprensis (Holub) T.Georgiadis
- Centaurea cyrenaica Bég. & Vacc.
- Centaurea dalmatica A.Kern.
- Centaurea damascena Boiss.
- Centaurea daralagoezica (Fomin) Greuter
- Centaurea davisii Wagenitz
- Centaurea debdouensis Breitw. & Podlech
- Centaurea debeauxii Godr. & Gren.
- Centaurea decipiens Thuill.
- Centaurea degeniana J.Wagner
- Centaurea degenianiformis Prodan
- Centaurea delbesiana Arènes
- Centaurea × delicata Nyár.
- Centaurea delicatula Breitw. & Podlech
- Centaurea delucae C.Guarino & Rampone
- Centaurea demetrii Dumbadze
- Centaurea demirizii Wagenitz
- Centaurea demirkapiensis Micevski
- Centaurea depressa M.Bieb.
- Centaurea derderiifolia Wagenitz
- Centaurea derventana Vis. & Pančić
- Centaurea deusta Ten.
- Centaurea deustiformis Adamović
- Centaurea devasiana Bergmeier & Strid
- Centaurea dezfulica Ranjbar & S.Mohamadi
- Centaurea dhofarica Baker
- Centaurea dichroa Boiss. & Heldr.
- Centaurea dichroantha A.Kern.
- Centaurea diffusa Lam.
- Centaurea diluta Aiton
- Centaurea diomedea Gasp.
- Centaurea djebel-amouri Greuter
- Centaurea × dobrogensis Prodan & J.Wagner
- Centaurea doddsii Post ex Boiss.
- Centaurea dominii (Dostál) Dubovik
- Centaurea donetzica Klokov
- Centaurea × doumerguei Faure & Maire
- Centaurea drabifolia Sm.
- Centaurea drabifolioides Hub.-Mor.
- Centaurea drenovensis Pils
- Centaurea dubjanskyi Iljin
- Centaurea ducellieri Batt. & Trab.
- Centaurea dumanii (Dinç, A.Duran & Bilgili) Dinç & Doğu
- Centaurea dumulosa Boiss.
- Centaurea dursunbeyensis Uysal & Köse
- Centaurea ebenoides Heldr. ex S.Moore
- Centaurea × eclipsislunae Mateo & M.B.Crespo
- Centaurea edith-mariae Radić
- Centaurea eflanensis (Kaya & Bancheva) Şirin & Ertuğrul
- Centaurea elazigensis Kaya & Vural
- Centaurea elbrusensis Boiss. & Buhse
- Centaurea elegantissima Bornm.
- Centaurea eliasii Sennen & Pau
- Centaurea emigrantis Bubani
- Centaurea emiliae Huseynova & Garakhani
- Centaurea emporitana Vayreda ex Hayek
- Centaurea ensiformis P.H.Davis
- Centaurea epapposa Velen.
- Centaurea epirota Halácsy
- Centaurea erdneri J.Wagner
- Centaurea erinacella Rech.f.
- Centaurea eriophora L.
- Centaurea ertugruliana Uysal
- Centaurea erycina Raimondo & Bancheva
- Centaurea eryngioides Lam.
- Centaurea esfandiarii Rech.f. & Aellen
- Centaurea euboica Rech.f.
- Centaurea euxina Velen.
- Centaurea exarata Boiss. ex Coss.
- Centaurea × extranea Beck ex Gugler
- Centaurea fabregatii Mateo & M.B.Crespo
- Centaurea farsistanica (Wagenitz) Ranjbar & Negaresh
- Centaurea fenzlii Reichardt
- Centaurea ferox Desf.
- Centaurea filiformis Viv.
- Centaurea finazzeri Adamović
- Centaurea flosculosa Balb. ex Willd.
- Centaurea × forsythiana Levier ex Filigh., Farris, Pisanu & Urbani
- Centaurea foucauldiana Maire
- Centaurea foveolata Blakelock
- Centaurea fragilis Durieu
- Centaurea francoi Figueiredo & Gideon F.Sm.
- Centaurea × frayana H.Boissieu ex Gáyer
- Centaurea friderici Vis.
- Centaurea furfuracea Coss. & Durieu
- Centaurea fuscomarginata (K.Koch) Juz.
- Centaurea fusiformis Blakelock
- Centaurea gabrieliae (Bornm.) Wagenitz
- Centaurea gabrielis-blancae Fern.Casas
- Centaurea gabrieljanae Greuter
- Centaurea gadorensis Blanca
- Centaurea galicicae Micevski
- Centaurea gallaecica (M.Laínz) Arnelas & Devesa
- Centaurea gattefossei Maire
- Centaurea × gautieriana Sennen
- Centaurea geluensis Boiss. & Hausskn.
- Centaurea × genesii-lopezii Fern.Casas & Susanna
- Centaurea gentilii Braun-Blanq. & Maire
- Centaurea gerberi Steven
- Centaurea gerhardii M.V.Agab.
- Centaurea germanicopolitana Bornm.
- Centaurea × gerstlaueri Erdner
- Centaurea ghahremanii Wagenitz & Esfand.
- Centaurea giardinae Raimondo & Spadaro
- Centaurea gigantea Sch.Bip. ex Boiss.
- Centaurea gjurasinii Bosnjak
- Centaurea glaberrima Tausch
- Centaurea glabroauriculata Uysal & Demir.
- Centaurea glastifolia L.
- Centaurea globurensis Nyár.
- Centaurea glomerata Vahl
- Centaurea gloriosa Radić
- Centaurea goerkii Yıld.
- Centaurea goksivriensis M.Bona
- Centaurea golestanica Akhani & Wagenitz
- Centaurea × grabowskiana J.Wagner
- Centaurea gracilenta Velen.
- Centaurea graeca Griseb.
- Centaurea × grafiana DC.
- Centaurea graminifolia (Lam.) Muñoz Rodr. & Devesa
- Centaurea granatensis Boiss. ex DC.
- Centaurea grbavacensis (Rohlena) Stoj. & Acht.
- Centaurea greuteri E.Gamal-Eldin & Wagenitz
- Centaurea grisebachii (Nyman) Heldr.
- Centaurea × grosii Font Quer
- Centaurea gubanovii Kamelin
- Centaurea gudrunensis Boiss. & Hausskn.
- Centaurea gulissashvilii Dumbadze
- Centaurea gussonei Raimondo & Spadaro
- Centaurea gymnocarpa Moris & De Not.
- Centaurea hadacii Wagenitz
- Centaurea haenseleri (Boiss.) Boiss. & Reut.
- Centaurea hakkariensis Wagenitz
- Centaurea halophila Hub.-Mor.
- Centaurea handelii Wagenitz
- Centaurea hanryi Jord.
- Centaurea haradjianii Wagenitz
- Centaurea haussknechtii Boiss.
- Centaurea haynaldiiformis Prodan
- Centaurea hekimhanensis Şirin & Yıldırım
- Centaurea heldreichii Halácsy
- Centaurea helenioides Boiss. & Hausskn.
- Centaurea hellwigii Ranjbar & Negaresh
- Centaurea heratensis Rech.f. & Köie
- Centaurea hermannii Hermann
- Centaurea hervieri Degen
- Centaurea heterocarpa Boiss. & Gaill.
- Centaurea heywoodiana Raimondo, Spadaro & Di Grist.
- Centaurea hierapolitana Boiss.
- Centaurea hohenackeri Steven
- Centaurea hololeuca Boiss.
- Centaurea homoeosceros Pau
- Centaurea horrida Badarò
- Centaurea huljakii J.Wagner
- Centaurea hyalolepis Boiss.
- Centaurea hymettia Kit Tan, Zograf. & Bancheva
- Centaurea hyrcanica Bornm.
- Centaurea hyssopifolia Vahl
- Centaurea iberica Trevir. ex Spreng.
- Centaurea ibn-tattoui Chamboul., Bidat & J.F.Léger
- Centaurea idaea Boiss. & Heldr.
- Centaurea ilvensis (Sommier) Arrigoni
- Centaurea immanuelis-loewii Degen
- Centaurea imperialis Hausskn. ex Bornm.
- Centaurea incompleta Halácsy
- Centaurea incompta Vis.
- Centaurea indistincta (Wagenitz) Ranjbar & Negaresh
- Centaurea inermis Velen.
- Centaurea inexpectata Wagenitz
- Centaurea inexpugnabilis P.P.Ferrer, Mansanet-Salvador & R.Roselló
- Centaurea infestans Durieu
- Centaurea integrans (Fiori) Naggi ex Prain
- Centaurea intricata Boiss.
- Centaurea involucrata Desf.
- Centaurea ionica Brullo
- Centaurea ipecensis Rech.f.
- Centaurea iranshahrii Wagenitz & Esfand.
- Centaurea irritans Wagenitz
- Centaurea isaurica Hub.-Mor.
- Centaurea isiliae H.Duman, Uzunh. & Bahadır
- Centaurea ispahanica Boiss.
- Centaurea jacea L.
- Centaurea × jaceiformis Rouy
- Centaurea jaennensis Degen & Debeaux
- Centaurea janeri Graells
- Centaurea jankae D.Brândză
- Centaurea jankeana Simonk.
- Centaurea japygica (Lacaita) Brullo
- Centaurea jeffreyana Mesfin
- Centaurea jiroftensis (Ranjbar & Negaresh) Ranjbar & Heydari
- Centaurea joharchii Ranjbar & Negaresh
- Centaurea johnseniana Kit Tan & Strid
- Centaurea jordaniana Godr. & Gren.
- Centaurea josiae Humbert
- Centaurea jovinianum Sennen & Pau
- Centaurea jurineifolia Boiss.
- Centaurea × juvenalis Delile ex Godr.
- Centaurea kabirkuhensis Mozaff., F.Ghahrem. & Fereid.
- Centaurea kalambakensis Freyn & Sint.
- Centaurea kamalnejadii Negaresh
- Centaurea kamyaranensis Ranjbar & Negaresh
- Centaurea kandavanensis Wagenitz
- Centaurea kanitziana Janka ex D.Brândză
- Centaurea karamianiae Negaresh
- Centaurea kartschiana Scop.
- Centaurea karvandarensis Rech.f.
- Centaurea kavadarensis Micevski
- Centaurea kaynakiae Daşkın & Yılmaz
- Centaurea kemulariae Dumbadze
- Centaurea kermanshahensis (Wagenitz) Ranjbar & Negaresh
- Centaurea kerneriana Janka
- Centaurea khosraviana Negaresh
- Centaurea kilaea Boiss.
- Centaurea kirikkalensis Özbek
- Centaurea kirmacii Uysal & Armağan
- Centaurea kizildaghensis Uzunh., E.Doğan & H.Duman
- Centaurea × kleinii C.T.Roché & Susanna
- Centaurea kochiana (Holub) Greuter
- Centaurea koeieana Bornm.
- Centaurea konkae Klokov
- Centaurea kosaninii Hayek
- Centaurea kotschyana Heuff.
- Centaurea kotschyi (Boiss.) Hayek
- Centaurea kozjakensis Micevski
- Centaurea × kuemmerlei Prodan & J.Wagner
- Centaurea kuhdashtensis Ranjbar & S.Mohamadi
- Centaurea kunkelii N.Garcia
- Centaurea × kupcsokiana J.Wagner
- Centaurea kurdica Reichardt
- Centaurea kusanii Radić
- Centaurea lacaitae Peruzzi
- Centaurea lacerata (Hausskn.) Halácsy
- Centaurea laconica Boiss.
- Centaurea lactiflora Halácsy
- Centaurea lactucifolia Boiss.
- Centaurea lagascana Graells
- Centaurea lainzii Fern.Casas
- Centaurea lancifolia Sieber ex Spreng.
- Centaurea langei Nyman
- Centaurea lanigera DC.
- Centaurea lanulata Eig
- Centaurea latiloba Klokov
- Centaurea laureotica Heldr. ex Halácsy
- Centaurea lavrenkoana Klokov
- Centaurea laxa Boiss. & Hausskn.
- Centaurea legionis-septimae Fern.Casas & Susanna
- Centaurea leonidia Kalpoutz. & Constantin.
- Centaurea leptophylla (K.Koch) Tchich.
- Centaurea leucadea Lacaita
- Centaurea leucomalla Bornm.
- Centaurea leucomelaena Hayek
- Centaurea leucophaea Jord.
- Centaurea limbata Hoffmanns. & Link
- Centaurea lingulata Lag.
- Centaurea linifolia L.
- Centaurea litardierei Jahand. & Maire
- Centaurea litigiosa (Fiori) Arrigoni
- Centaurea litochorea T.Georgiadis & Phitos
- Centaurea × livonica Weinm.
- Centaurea longepedunculata Sch.Bip. ex Boiss.
- Centaurea longifimbriata Wagenitz
- Centaurea longispina (Post) Wagenitz
- Centaurea loscosii Willk.
- Centaurea lovricii Bogdanović, Boršić, Ljubičić, Brullo & Giusso
- Centaurea lugdunensis Jord.
- Centaurea luristanica Rech.f.
- Centaurea luschaniana Heimerl ex Stapf
- Centaurea lusitanica Boiss. & Reut.
- Centaurea lycaonica Boiss. & Heldr.
- Centaurea lycia Boiss.
- Centaurea lycopifolia Boiss. & Kotschy
- Centaurea lydia Boiss.
- Centaurea macedonica Boiss.
- Centaurea macroacantha Guss.
- Centaurea macrocephala Muss.Puschk. ex Willd.
- Centaurea macroptilon Borbás
- Centaurea magistrorum Arrigoni & Camarda
- Centaurea magocsyana W.H.Wagner
- Centaurea maireana Emb.
- Centaurea × mairei Faure
- Centaurea majorovii Dumbadze
- Centaurea malacitana Boiss.
- Centaurea malatyensis Kültür & M.Bona
- Centaurea malinvaldiana Batt.
- Centaurea mannagettae Podp.
- Centaurea maramarosiensis (Jáv.) Czerep.
- Centaurea marashica Uzunh., Tekşen & E.Doğan
- Centaurea margarita-alba Klokov
- Centaurea mariana Nyman
- Centaurea × maritima Dufour
- Centaurea marmorea Bornm. & Soska
- Centaurea maroccana Ball
- Centaurea × masfitensis Benavent, P.P.Ferrer, Ferriol, Garmendia & Merle
- Centaurea masjedsoleymanensis Ranjbar & Askari
- Centaurea matthiolifolia Boiss.
- Centaurea mayeri Radić
- Centaurea × melanocalathia Borbás
- Centaurea melanocephala Pančić
- Centaurea melanosticta (Lange) Franco
- Centaurea melitensis L.
- Centaurea mengenensis Uysal & Şirin
- Centaurea mersinensis Uysal & Hamzaoğlu
- Centaurea mesopotamica Bornm.
- Centaurea messenicolasiana T.Georgiadis, Dimitrellos & Routsi
- Centaurea micevskii Greuter
- Centaurea micracantha Dufour
- Centaurea micrantha Hoffmanns. & Link
- Centaurea microcarpa Coss. & Durieu ex Batt. & Trab.
- Centaurea microcnicus Reese & Sam.
- Centaurea microlonchoides Boiss.
- Centaurea microlopha (Boiss.) Ranjbar & Negaresh
- Centaurea molesworthiae E.López, Devesa & García Rojas
- Centaurea mollis Waldst. & Kit.
- Centaurea monodii Arènes
- Centaurea montaltensis (Fiori) Peruzzi
- Centaurea montana L.
- Centaurea monticola Boiss. ex DC.
- Centaurea montis-borlae Soldano
- Centaurea mouterdei Wagenitz
- Centaurea movlavia Parsa
- Centaurea mozaffarianii Negaresh
- Centaurea mucurensis Teyber
- Centaurea murbeckii Hayek
- Centaurea musakii T.Georgiadis
- Centaurea musarum Boiss. & Orph.
- Centaurea musimonum Maire
- Centaurea × mutabilis St.-Amans
- Centaurea nallihanensis Uysal & Hamzaoğlu
- Centaurea nana Desf.
- Centaurea napifolia L.
- Centaurea napulifera Rochel
- Centaurea neiceffii Degen & J.Wagner
- Centaurea nemecii Nábělek
- Centaurea nemoralis Jord.
- Centaurea nerimaniae Kültür
- Centaurea nervosa Willd.
- Centaurea nevadensis Boiss. & Reut.
- Centaurea nicolai Bald.
- Centaurea niederi Heldr.
- Centaurea nigerica Hutch.
- Centaurea nigra L.
- Centaurea nigrescens Willd.
- Centaurea nigrofimbria Sosn.
- Centaurea nissana Petrovič
- Centaurea nivea (Bornm.) Wagenitz
- Centaurea nobilis (E.Groves) Brullo
- Centaurea × noguerensis Mateo
- Centaurea × nouelii Franch. ex H.J.Coste
- Centaurea novakii Dostál
- Centaurea × numantina A.Segura
- Centaurea nydeggeri Hub.-Mor.
- Centaurea obtusifolia (Boiss. & Hausskn.) Wagenitz
- Centaurea obtusiloba Batt.
- Centaurea occasus Fern.Casas
- Centaurea ochrocephala Wagenitz
- Centaurea odessana Prodan
- Centaurea odyssei Wagenitz
- Centaurea ognjanoffii Urum.
- Centaurea oltensis Sosn.
- Centaurea olympica (DC.) K.Koch
- Centaurea omphalodes (Benth. & Hook.f.) Coss.
- Centaurea onopordifolia Boiss.
- Centaurea oranensis Greuter & M.V.Agab.
- Centaurea orbelica Velen.
- Centaurea orientalis L.
- Centaurea oriolii-bolosii Fern.Casas
- Centaurea ornata Willd.
- Centaurea orphanidea Heldr. & Sartori ex Boiss.
- Centaurea orumiehensis Ranjbar & Negaresh
- Centaurea oscensis (Pau ex E.López & Devesa) Raab-Straube & Greuter
- Centaurea ossaea Halácsy
- Centaurea ovina Pall. ex Willd.
- Centaurea oxylepis (Wimm. & Grab.) Hayek
- Centaurea pabotii Wagenitz
- Centaurea paczoskyi Kotov ex Klokov
- Centaurea palanganensis Ranjbar & Askari
- Centaurea pallescens Delile
- Centaurea pamphylica Boiss. & Heldr.
- Centaurea pandataria (Fiori & Bég.) Bég.
- Centaurea pangaea Greuter & Papan.
- Centaurea paniculata L.
- Centaurea panormitana Lojac.
- Centaurea paphlagonica (Bornm.) Wagenitz
- Centaurea papposa (Coss.) Greuter
- Centaurea × paredensis (G.López) Mateo & Arán
- Centaurea parilica Stoj. & Stef.
- Centaurea parlatoris Heldr.
- Centaurea parviflora Desf.
- Centaurea patula DC.
- Centaurea × paucispina (Ferriol, Merle & Garmendia) P.P.Ferrer, Ferriol, Merle & Garmendia
- Centaurea paui Loscos ex Willk.
- Centaurea pauneroi Talavera & J.Muñoz
- Centaurea pawlowskii Phitos & Damboldt
- Centaurea paxorum Phitos & T.Georgiadis
- Centaurea pectinata L.
- Centaurea pelia DC.
- Centaurea peltieri Homrani-Bakali & Susanna
- Centaurea pentadactyli Brullo, Scelsi & Spamp.
- Centaurea perrottettii DC.
- Centaurea persica Boiss.
- Centaurea pestalotii De Not. ex Ces.
- Centaurea pestalozzae Boiss.
- Centaurea peucedanifolia Boiss. & Orph.
- Centaurea phaeolepis Coss.
- Centaurea phalacrica Brullo, Cambria, Crisafulli, Tavilla & Sciandr.
- Centaurea phlomoides Boiss. & Hausskn.
- Centaurea phrygia L.
- Centaurea pichleri Boiss.
- Centaurea pinae Pau
- Centaurea pinardii Boiss.
- Centaurea pindicola Griseb.
- Centaurea pineticola Iljin
- Centaurea pinetorum Hub.-Mor.
- Centaurea × pinillosii Mateo & M.B.Crespo
- Centaurea pinnata Pau ex Vicioso
- Centaurea pinnatifida Schur
- Centaurea poculatoris Greuter
- Centaurea podospermifolia Loscos & J.Pardo
- Centaurea poeltiana Puntillo
- Centaurea polyacantha Willd.
- Centaurea polyclada DC.
- Centaurea polymorpha Lag.
- Centaurea polyphylla Ledeb. ex Nordm.
- Centaurea polypodiifolia Boiss.
- Centaurea pomeliana Batt.
- Centaurea pontica Prodan & Nyár.
- Centaurea postii Boiss.
- Centaurea praecox Oliv. & Hiern
- Centaurea × preissmannii Hayek
- Centaurea princeps Boiss. & Heldr.
- Centaurea procurrens Sieber ex Spreng.
- Centaurea prolongi Boiss. ex DC.
- Centaurea proto-gerberi Klokov
- Centaurea proto-margaritacea Klokov
- Centaurea pseudoaxillaris Stef. & T.Georgiev
- Centaurea pseudobovina Hayek ex Stoj. & Stef.
- Centaurea pseudocadmea Wagenitz
- Centaurea pseudocineraria (Fiori) Rouy
- Centaurea pseudodegeniana Prodan
- Centaurea pseudokotschyi Wagenitz
- Centaurea pseudoleucolepis Kleopow
- Centaurea pseudomaculosa Dobrocz.
- Centaurea pseudomagocsyana Prodan
- Centaurea pseudoreflexa Hayek
- Centaurea pseudoscabiosa Boiss. & Buhse
- Centaurea pseudosinaica Czerep.
- Centaurea psilacantha Boiss. & Heldr.
- Centaurea ptarmicifolia Halácsy ex Hayek
- Centaurea pterocaula Trautv.
- Centaurea ptosimopappa Hayek
- Centaurea ptosimopappoides Wagenitz
- Centaurea pubescens Willd.
- Centaurea pugioniformis Nyár.
- Centaurea pulchella Ledeb.
- Centaurea pullata L.
- Centaurea pulvinata (Blanca) Blanca
- Centaurea pungens Pomel
- Centaurea radichii Plazibat
- Centaurea ragusina L.
- Centaurea rahiminejadii Negaresh
- Centaurea raimondoi Bancheva & Kaya
- Centaurea raphanina Sm.
- Centaurea ravansarensis Ranjbar & Negaresh
- Centaurea rechingeri Phitos
- Centaurea redempta Heldr.
- Centaurea × reditus F.Herm.
- Centaurea reducta Wagenitz
- Centaurea reflexa Lam.
- Centaurea regia Boiss.
- Centaurea reichenbachii DC.
- Centaurea resupinata Coss.
- Centaurea reuteriana Boiss.
- Centaurea rhaetica Moritzi
- Centaurea rhizantha C.A.Mey.
- Centaurea rhizocalathium (K.Koch) Boiss.
- Centaurea rigida Banks & Sol.
- Centaurea rivasmateoi Ladero
- Centaurea ropalon Pomel
- Centaurea × rossiana J.Wagner
- Centaurea rouyi Coincy
- Centaurea rufidula Bornm.
- Centaurea rumelica Boiss.
- Centaurea rupestris L.
- Centaurea rutifolia Sm.
- Centaurea saccensis Raimondo, Bancheva & Ilardi
- Centaurea sagredoi Blanca
- Centaurea sakarensis Bancheva & Raimondo
- Centaurea sakariyaensis Uysal & Dural
- Centaurea saligna (K.Koch) Wagenitz
- Centaurea salmasensis Ranjbar & Heydari
- Centaurea salonitana Vis.
- Centaurea samothracica Strid & Kit Tan
- Centaurea sanandajensis Ranjbar & Negaresh
- Centaurea × sanchisiana Gómez Nav., Mansanet-Salvador, P.P.Ferrer, R.Roselló, E.Laguna & Peris
- Centaurea sarandinakiae N.B.Illar.
- Centaurea × saratoi (Briq.) Rouy
- Centaurea sarfattiana Brullo, Gangale & Uzunov
- Centaurea savranica Klokov
- Centaurea saxicola Lag.
- Centaurea saxifraga Coincy
- Centaurea scabiosa L.
- Centaurea scannensis Anzal., Soldano & F.Conti
- Centaurea schimperi DC.
- Centaurea schousboei Lange
- Centaurea scillae Brullo
- Centaurea sclerolepis Boiss.
- Centaurea scoparia Sieber ex Spreng.
- Centaurea scopulorum Boiss. & Heldr.
- Centaurea scripczinskyi Mikheev
- Centaurea seguenzae (Lacaita) Brullo, Marcenò & Siracusa
- Centaurea × semiaustriaca Nyár.
- Centaurea semidecurrens Jord.
- Centaurea semiusta Juz.
- Centaurea senegalensis DC.
- Centaurea × senneniana Rouy
- Centaurea sennikoviana Negaresh & Kaya
- Centaurea sericea Wagenitz
- Centaurea seridis L.
- Centaurea serpentinica A.Duran & B.Doğan
- Centaurea shahuensis Ranjbar & Negaresh
- Centaurea shehbazii Ranjbar & Negaresh
- Centaurea shouilea Parsa
- Centaurea shumkana Kit Tan, Shuka & Wagenitz
- Centaurea sicana Raimondo & Spadaro
- Centaurea sicula L.
- Centaurea sieheana Wagenitz
- Centaurea × similata Hausskn.
- Centaurea simonkaiana Hayek
- Centaurea simulans Wagenitz
- Centaurea sinaica DC.
- Centaurea singarensis Boiss. & Hausskn.
- Centaurea sintenisiana Gand.
- Centaurea sipylea Wagenitz
- Centaurea sirdjanica Parsa
- Centaurea sivasica Wagenitz
- Centaurea skopjensis Micevski
- Centaurea solitaria Ranjbar & Negaresh
- Centaurea solstitialis L.
- Centaurea sophiae Klokov
- Centaurea × soriana A.Segura ex Mateo & M.B.Crespo
- Centaurea soskae Hayek
- Centaurea speciosa Boiss.
- Centaurea spectabilis (DC.) Sch.Bip.
- Centaurea sphaerocephala L.
- Centaurea spicata Boiss.
- Centaurea spinosa L.
- Centaurea spinosociliata Seenus
- Centaurea splendens L.
- Centaurea spruneri Boiss. & Heldr.
- Centaurea × spuria Kern.
- Centaurea stapfiana (Hand.-Mazz.) Wagenitz
- Centaurea stereophylla Besser
- Centaurea sterilis Steven
- Centaurea steveniana Klokov
- Centaurea stevenii M.Bieb.
- Centaurea stoebe L.
- Centaurea stricta Waldst. & Kit.
- Centaurea stuessyi Arnelas, Devesa & E.López
- Centaurea subsericans Halácsy
- Centaurea subtilis Bertol.
- Centaurea sulphurea Willd.
- Centaurea susannae Invernón & Devesa
- Centaurea tabriziana Ranjbar & Heydari
- Centaurea tadshicorum Tzvelev
- Centaurea takhtajanii Gabrieljan & Tonyan
- Centaurea takredensis Coss. ex Maire
- Centaurea tanaitica Klokov
- Centaurea tardiflora Wagenitz
- Centaurea tauromenitana Guss.
- Centaurea tauscheri A.Kern.
- Centaurea tchihatcheffii Fisch. & C.A.Mey.
- Centaurea tenacissima (Groves) Brullo
- Centaurea tenoreana Willk.
- Centaurea tenorei Guss. ex Lacaita
- Centaurea thasia Hayek
- Centaurea theryi Emb. & Maire
- Centaurea thessala Hausskn.
- Centaurea thirkei Sch.Bip.
- Centaurea thracica (Janka) Gugler
- Centaurea thuillieri (Dostál) J.Duvign. & Lambinon
- Centaurea toletana Boiss. & Reut.
- Centaurea tomentella Hand.-Mazz.
- Centaurea tommasinii A.Kern.
- Centaurea tomorosii Micevski
- Centaurea torreana Ten.
- Centaurea tossiensis Freyn & Sint.
- Centaurea tougourensis Boiss. & Reut.
- Centaurea trachonitica Post
- Centaurea transcaucasica Sosn. ex Grossh.
- Centaurea × trauttmannii J.Wagner
- Centaurea treskana Micevski
- Centaurea triamularia Aldén
- Centaurea trichocephala M.Bieb. ex Willd.
- Centaurea triniifolia Heuff.
- Centaurea tripontina López-Alvarado, L.Sáez, Filigh., Guardiola & Susan
- Centaurea triumfettii All.
- Centaurea tuntasia Heldr. ex Halácsy
- Centaurea turkestanica Franch.
- Centaurea tuzgoluensis Aytaç & H.Duman
- Centaurea tymphaea Hausskn.
- Centaurea ugamica Iljin
- Centaurea ulrichiorum Wagenitz, F.H.Hellw. & Parolly
- Centaurea ultreiae Silva Pando
- Centaurea uniflora Turra
- Centaurea urgellensis Sennen
- Centaurea urvillei DC.
- Centaurea ustulata DC.
- Centaurea uysalii Şirin & Çeçen
- Centaurea valdemonensis Domina, Di Grist. & Barone
- Centaurea valesiaca (DC.) Jord.
- Centaurea vandasii Velen.
- Centaurea vanensis Wagenitz
- Centaurea vankovii Klokov
- Centaurea varnensis Velen.
- Centaurea vatevii Degen, Urumov & Wagn.
- Centaurea vavilovii Takht. & Gabrieljan
- Centaurea veneris (Sommier) Bég.
- Centaurea vermia Rech.f.
- Centaurea vermiculigera Hub.-Mor.
- Centaurea verutum L.
- Centaurea vesceritensis Boiss.
- Centaurea vichrenensis (Skokanová) Raus & Strid
- Centaurea virescens (Guss.) Domina & Raimondo
- Centaurea virgata Lam.
- Centaurea visianii Radić
- Centaurea vlachorum Hartvig
- Centaurea vorasana (Skokanová) Raus & Strid
- Centaurea wagenitzii Hub.-Mor.
- Centaurea wallichiana Less.
- Centaurea wendelboi Wagenitz
- Centaurea werneri Wagenitz, F.H.Hellw. & Parolly
- Centaurea wettsteinii Degen & Dörfl.
- Centaurea wiedemanniana Fisch. & C.A.Mey.
- Centaurea wolgensis DC.
- Centaurea woronowii Bornm. ex Sosn.
- Centaurea xaveri N.Garcia & Susanna
- Centaurea xerolepida Pau
- Centaurea xylobasis Rech.f.
- Centaurea yaltirikii N.Aksoy, H.Duman & Efe
- Centaurea yemensis Wagenitz
- Centaurea yozgatensis Wagenitz
- Centaurea zaferii Negaresh
- Centaurea zagrosmontana Ranjbar & Heydari
- Centaurea zangulensis Ranjbar & Negaresh
- Centaurea zarrei Negaresh
- Centaurea zeybekii Wagenitz
- Centaurea ziganensis Yüzb., M.Bona & İ.Genç
- Centaurea zlatarskyana Urum. & J.Wagner
- Centaurea zlatiborensis Zlatković, Novaković & Janaćković
- Centaurea × zubiae Pau
- Centaurea zuccariniana DC.
