= Giardino Botanico Alpinia =

Botanical garden in Italy

Coordinates: 45.8833°N 8.5167°E

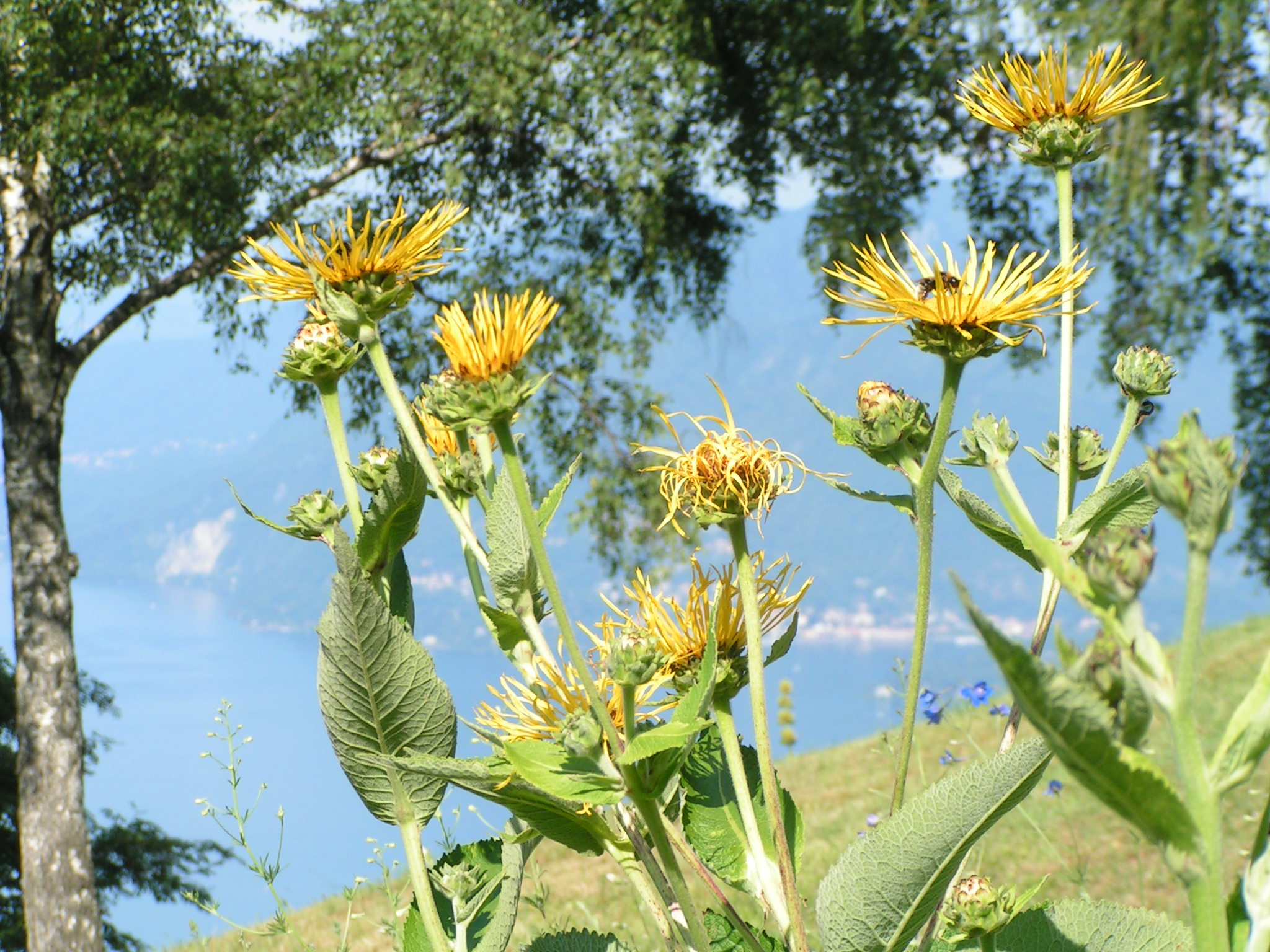
Giardino Botanico Alpinia

The Giardino Botanico Alpinia (4 hectares) is a botanical garden specializing in alpine plants, located at 800 m altitude above Stresa on Lake Maggiore, Province of Verbano-Cusio-Ossola, Piedmont, Italy. It could be reached via the Lido di Carciano - Alpino - Mottarone cable car until the Stresa–Mottarone cable car crash, and is open daily in the warmer months.

The garden was established in 1934 with the name Duxia. Today it contains about 1,000 species, focusing mainly on the Alps and foothills, with additional specimens from the Caucasus, China, and Japan. Its collections include:

- Artemisia (A. atrata, A. borealis, A. campestris, A. chamaemelifolia, A. genipi, A. umbelliformis, A. vallesiaca)
- Campanula (C. bononiensis, C. excisa, C. glomerata, C. spicata, C. thyrsoides)
- Centaurea (C. bracteata, C. cyanus, C. montana, C. phrygia, C. scabiosa, C. triumfettii),
- Dianthus (D. alpinus, D. carthusianorum, D. seguieri, D. sylvestris)
- Geranium (G. argenteum, G. macrorrhizum, G. phaeum, G. pratense, G. sanguineum, G. sylvaticum)
- Silene (S. alpestris, S. dioica, S. rupestris, S. saxifraga, S. vallesia).

Additional species are displayed on nearby walks. The garden's nature walk displays

- Acer pseudoplatanus
- Arundo donax
- Betula pubescens
- Cytisus scoparius
- Fagus sylvatica
- Frangula alnus
- Fraxinus excelsior
- Juniperus communis
- Laburnum anagyroides
- Lythrum salicaria
- Sorbus aria
- S. aucuparia
- Iris pseudacorus
- I. sibirica
- Myosotis scorpioides
- Salix sp.
- Scirpus sylvaticus
- Silphium perfoliatum
- Typha latifolia

The trail from Stresa to the Mottarone passes by:

- Androsace vandellii
- Campanula glomerata
- Gentiana asclepiadea
- G. kochiana
- G. purpurea
- Hypochoeris uniflora
- Narcissus poeticus
- Primula hirsuta
- Rhododendron ferrugineum
- Trollius europaeus
- Veratrum album.

== See also ==
- List of botanical gardens in Italy
