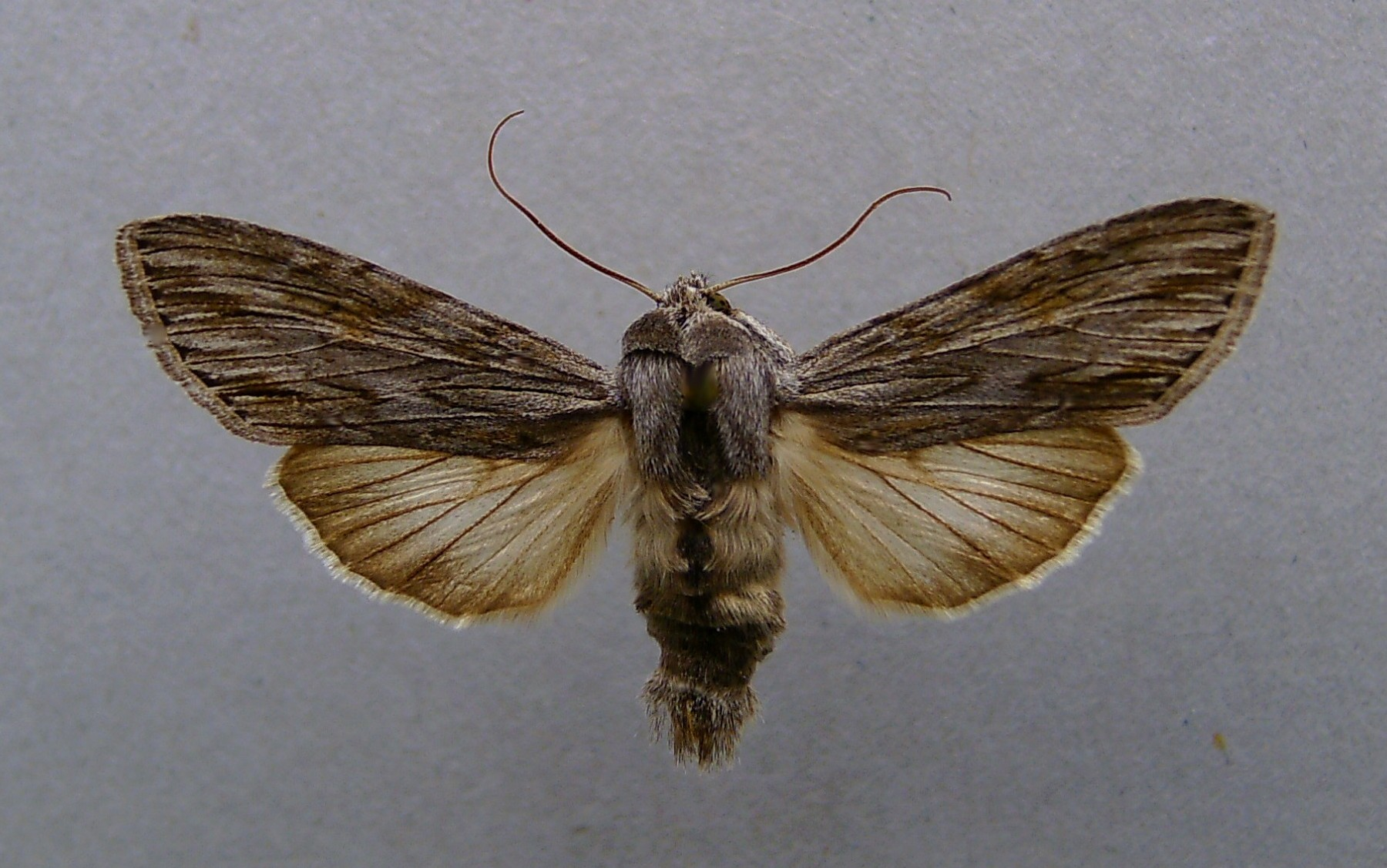

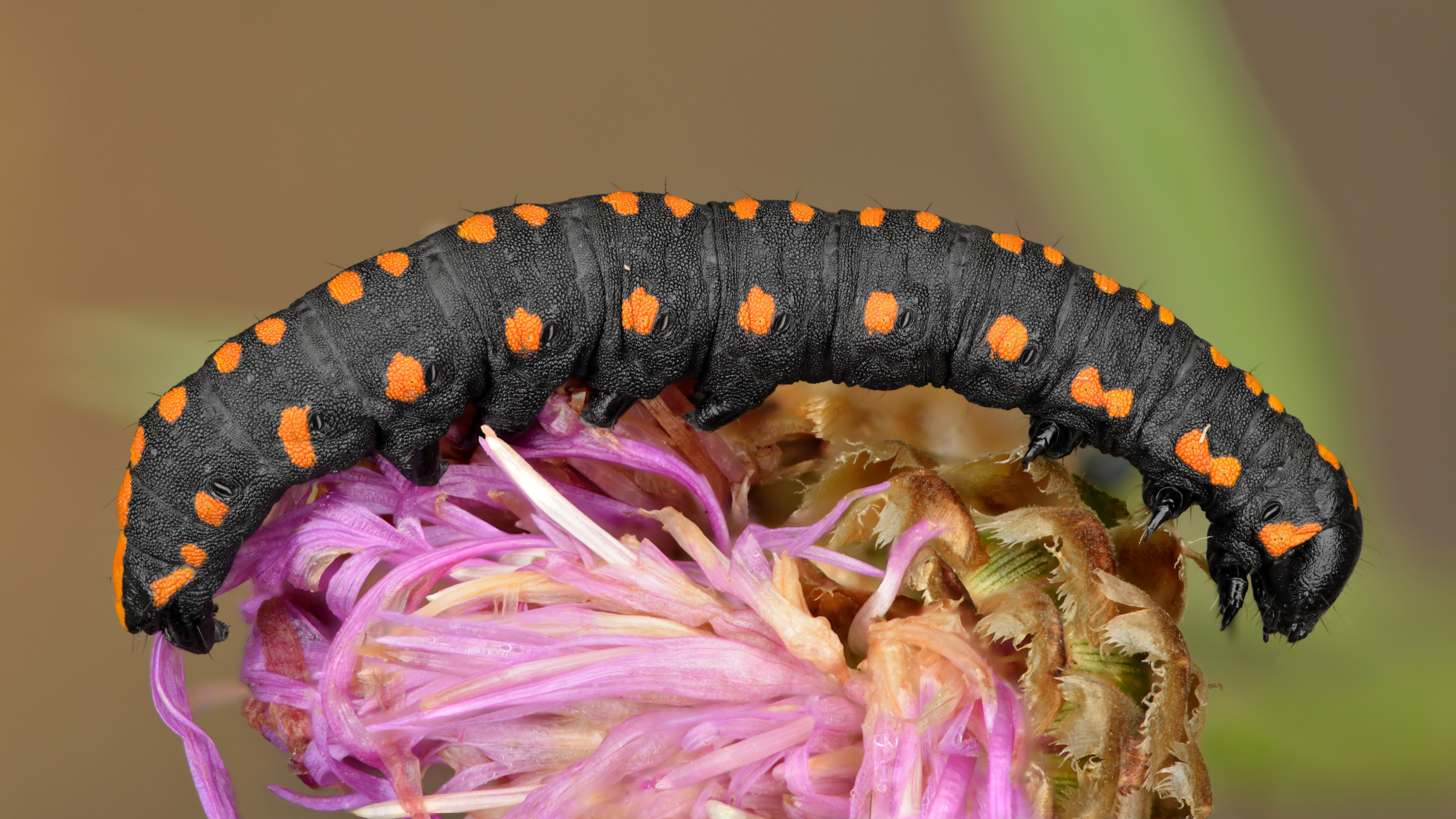
- Caterpillar

Scientific classification
- Domain: Eukaryota
- Kingdom: Animalia
- Phylum: Arthropoda
- Class: Insecta
- Order: Lepidoptera
- Superfamily: Noctuoidea
- Family: Noctuidae
- Genus: Cucullia
- Species: C. lucifuga

Binomial name
- Cucullia lucifuga (Denis & Schiffermüller, 1775)

Synonyms
- Noctua lucifuga Denis & Schiffermüller, 1775

= Cucullia lucifuga =

Species of moth

Cucullia lucifuga is a species of moth of the family Noctuidae. It is found in north, central and southern Europe east to Japan. It is also present in Tibet and Armenia.

The wingspan is 38–55 mm. There is one generation per year in the north, with adults on wing from May to June. In the warmer regions in the south, there is a second generation with adults on wing from July to August and a partial third generation with adults in October.

The larvae feed on various Asteraceae (or Compositae) species, including Tussilago farfara, Petasites paradoxus, Cirsium arvense, Centaurea phrygia, Sonchus arvensis, Hieracium umbellatum and Taraxacum species.
