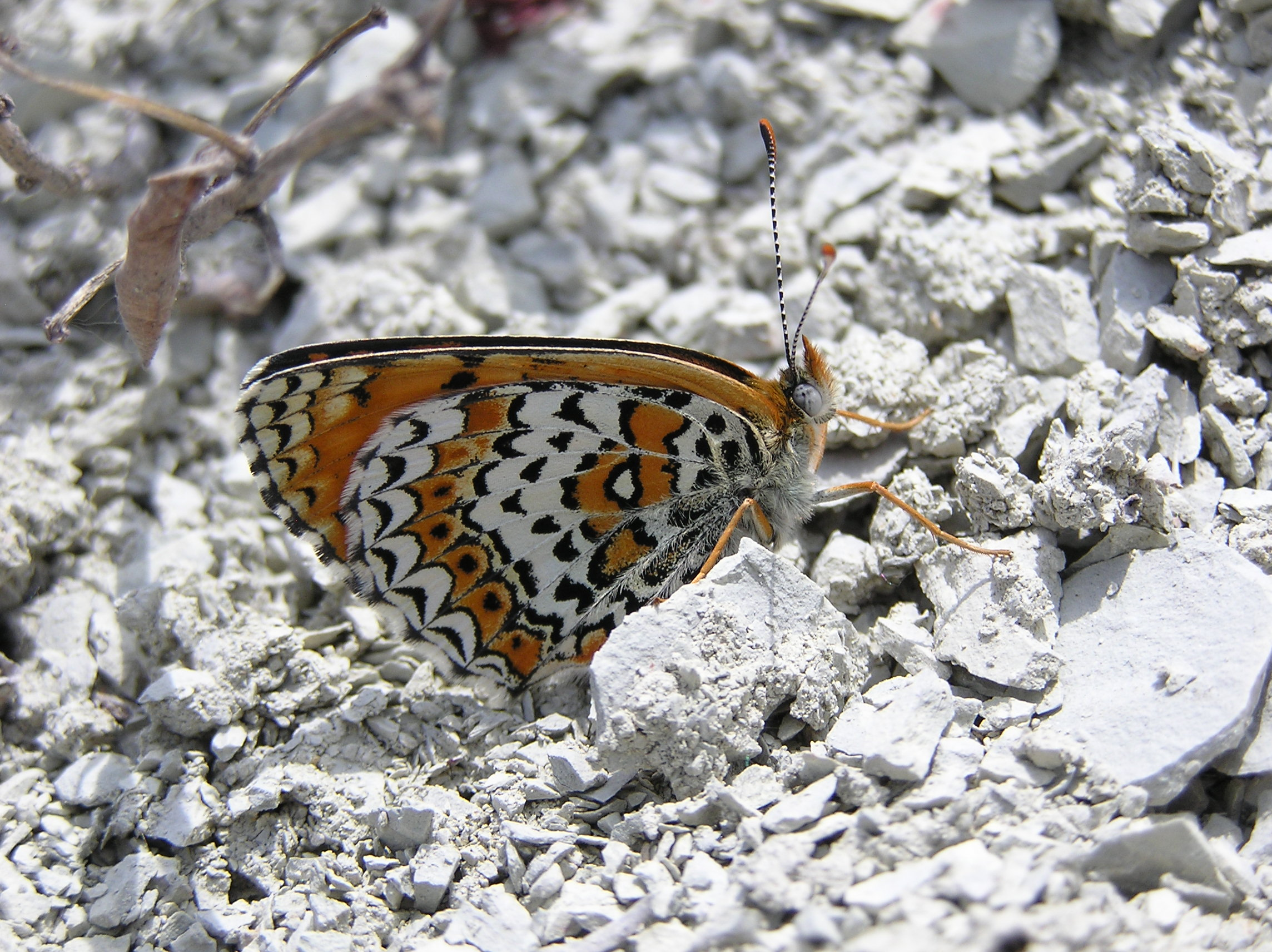

Scientific classification
- Kingdom: Animalia
- Phylum: Arthropoda
- Clade: Pancrustacea
- Class: Insecta
- Order: Lepidoptera
- Family: Nymphalidae
- Genus: Melitaea
- Species: M. arduinna

Binomial name
- Melitaea arduinna (Esper, 1783)

Synonyms
- Papilio arduinna Esper, 1783; Melitaea rhodopensis Freyer, [1836]

= Melitaea arduinna =

Species of butterfly

Melitaea arduinna, or Freyer's fritillary, is a butterfly of the family Nymphalidae. It is found from south-eastern Europe across Asia Minor to central Asia and the Altai. The habitat consists of steppe-clad slopes.

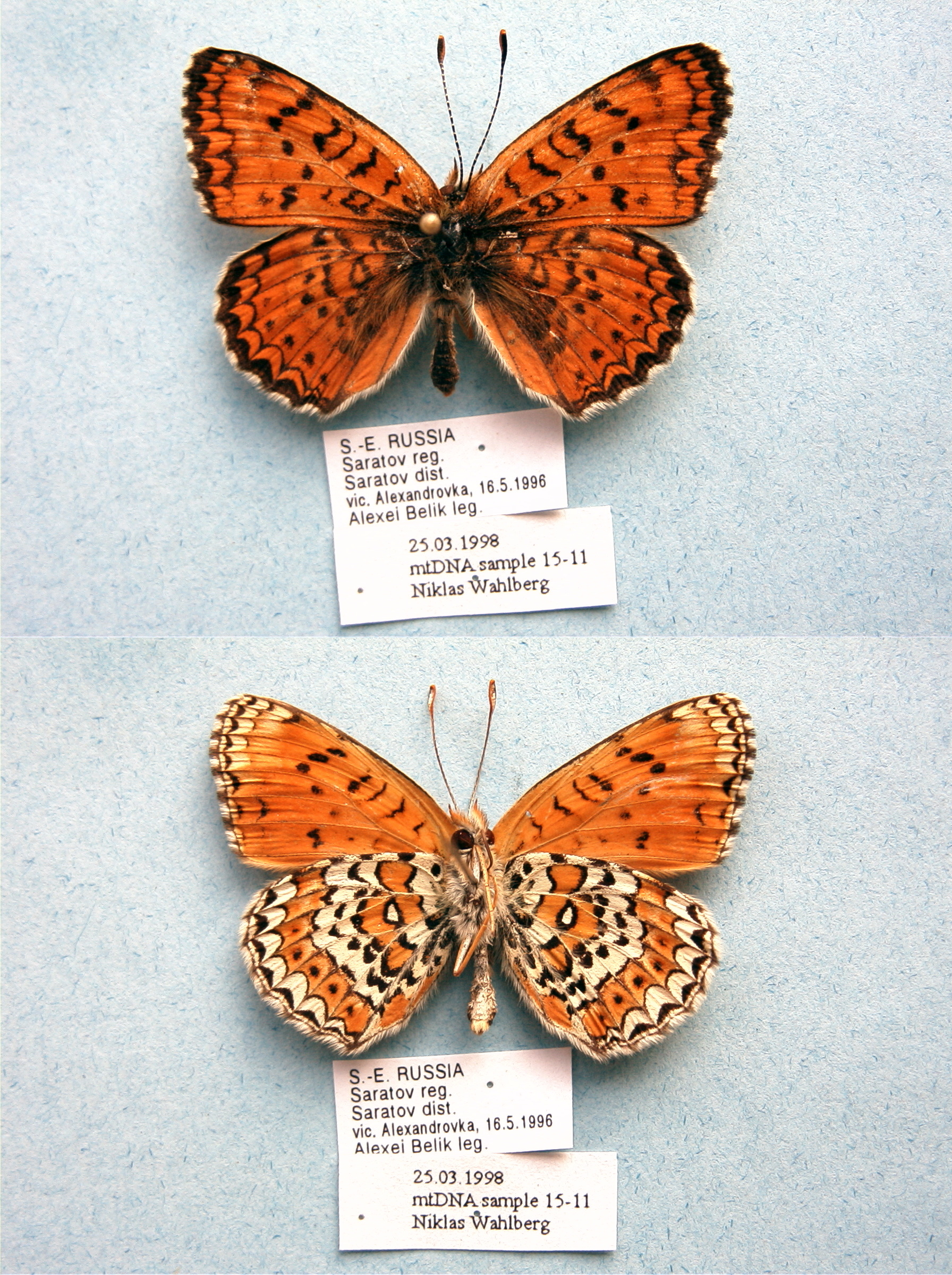

The wingspan is 45–50 mm. Similar to the Melitaea cinxia bearing likewise black dots in the submarginal reddish yellow spots of the hindwing, but the forewing much more obtuse, distally broader, moreover usually duller coloured, being more brownish; the distal marginal area darker, the black markings being strongly developed, the median area with less markings, the black lunate lines being partly obsolescent, partly composed of irregular remnants. The underside, too, particularly on the hindwing, is essentially lighter in consequence of the black markings being broken up and reduced.

The larvae feed on Centaurea species, including C. behen. The larvae overwinter in a web nest on the host plant. Pupation takes place in a pupa which is attached to the stem of the host plant just above the ground.

== Subspecies ==
- Melitaea arduinna arduinna (south-eastern Europe, south-western Siberia, Altai, Alai, northern Tian Shan, Dzhungarsky Alatau, Tarbagatai, Saur)
- Melitaea arduinna uralensis Eversmann, 1844 (South Urals)
- Melitaea arduinna rhodopensis Freyer, [1836] ground-colour is much brighter and deeper yellowish brown, the marginal markings being distinct and those in the central area somewhat reduced, the markings in the basal area thin and less dark; the black lunate lines on the hindwing beneath partly broken up into small bars and hooks; in May and June in Armenia and the Transalai, at a considerable altitude. (Type locality assumed Rhodope Mountains, Balkans)
- Melitaea arduinna kocaki Wagener & Gross, 1976 (Transcaucasia)
- Melitaea arduinna evanescens Staudinger, 1886 the black markings are entirely absent from the outer third of the upperside, apart from the marginal markings.(Kopet-Dagh, Ghissar-Darvaz, western Pamirs, Israel)

== Etymology ==
From the Latin arduum a high place
