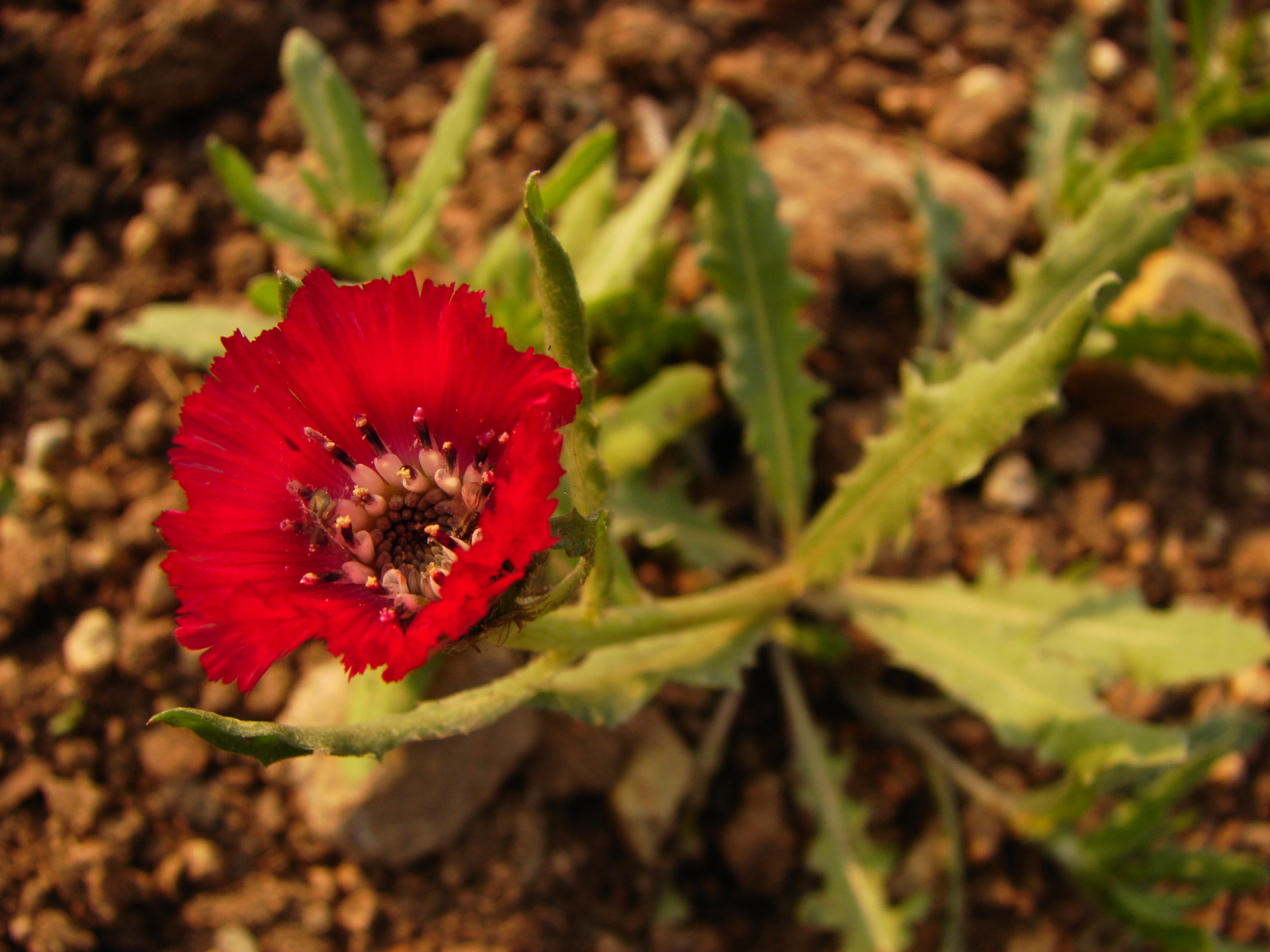

Scientific classification
- Kingdom: Plantae
- Clade: Tracheophytes
- Clade: Angiosperms
- Clade: Eudicots
- Clade: Asterids
- Order: Asterales
- Family: Asteraceae
- Genus: Centaurea
- Species: C. tchihatcheffii

Binomial name
- Centaurea tchihatcheffii Fischer & C.A.Meyer

= Centaurea tchihatcheffii =

Species of flowering plant

Centaurea tchihatcheffii is a species of flowering plant in the family Asteraceae. The flowers are most attractive as the pale or dark pinkish-red marginal florets (the most frequent colour form) take on an iridescent shimmer in the sun and wind, hence the vernacular name Yanardöner, meaning ‘iridescent flower’. It flowers from late April to mid-June and in cultivation even earlier, e.g., March in Istanbul. The peak flowering period is mid-May and in earlier years it was sold in some quantity by street florists in Ankara. It is mainly bee-, bug- and beetle-pollinated. Ants play an important role in seed dispersal and the fully ripe fat achenes are a delight for pigeons which settle down to feed in large flocks. The species is of taxonomic interest as it has some rather unusual and unique features not existing in any other Centaurea. For example, the marginal florets are funnel-shaped with crenate margins. The anther-tube is provided with glands at the tips of the appendages.

Boissier (1875) established it as belonging to the genus Melanoloma Cass., proposing the combination Melanoloma tchihatchewi (Fischer & C.A. Meyer) Boiss. However, the type species of Melanoloma is Centaurea pullata which has no affinities at all with C. tchihatcheffii. The species was placed in Centaurea sect. Cyanus (Mill.) W.D.J. Koch by Wagenitz (1975) and currently in Cyanus Mill. (Cyanus tchihatcheffii (Fischer & C. A. Meyer) Wagenitz & Greuter. Three annual members of this section with which C. tchihatcheffii has a superficial resemblance are Centaurea cyanus L., the nomenclatural type, with the chromosome number of 2n = 24 (x = 12), Centaurea cyanoides Wahlenb. with 2n = 18 (x = 9) and Centaurea depressa M. Bieb. with 2n=16 (x=8), (Wagenitz and Hellwig 1996). However, C. tchihatcheffii has 2n=20, with x=10 (Gömürgen and Adigüzel 2001), the same number as occurring in the derived species of the perennial section C. sect. Protocyanus (Dobrocz.) Czerep. Centaurea tchihatcheffii Fischer & C.A. Meyer was first described in Ann. Sci. Nat. sér. 4, 1: 31 (1854).

Pyotr Chikhachyov’s original material from his travels to Anatolia was deposited with the Société botanique de France, which collections were later included in Paris (P). As the novelties from Anatolia were described by Fischer & C.A. Meyer it would seem more likely that the specimens on which the descriptions were based were those duplicates sent to LE (thus potential holotypes) and not those remaining at P (part of the original set). Thus the holotype of Michauxia tchihatchewii Fischer & C.A. Meyer is stated as deposited in LE, and the late Jaakko Jalas (Helsinki) typified Thymus fallax with the specimen deposited at LE (holo. LE, fragm. W) and Thymus pectinatus collected by Tchihatcheff from the same locality as the Michauxia, as holo.? LE; iso. W. However, only the fragments at W, not at LE, have been seen by Jalas.
