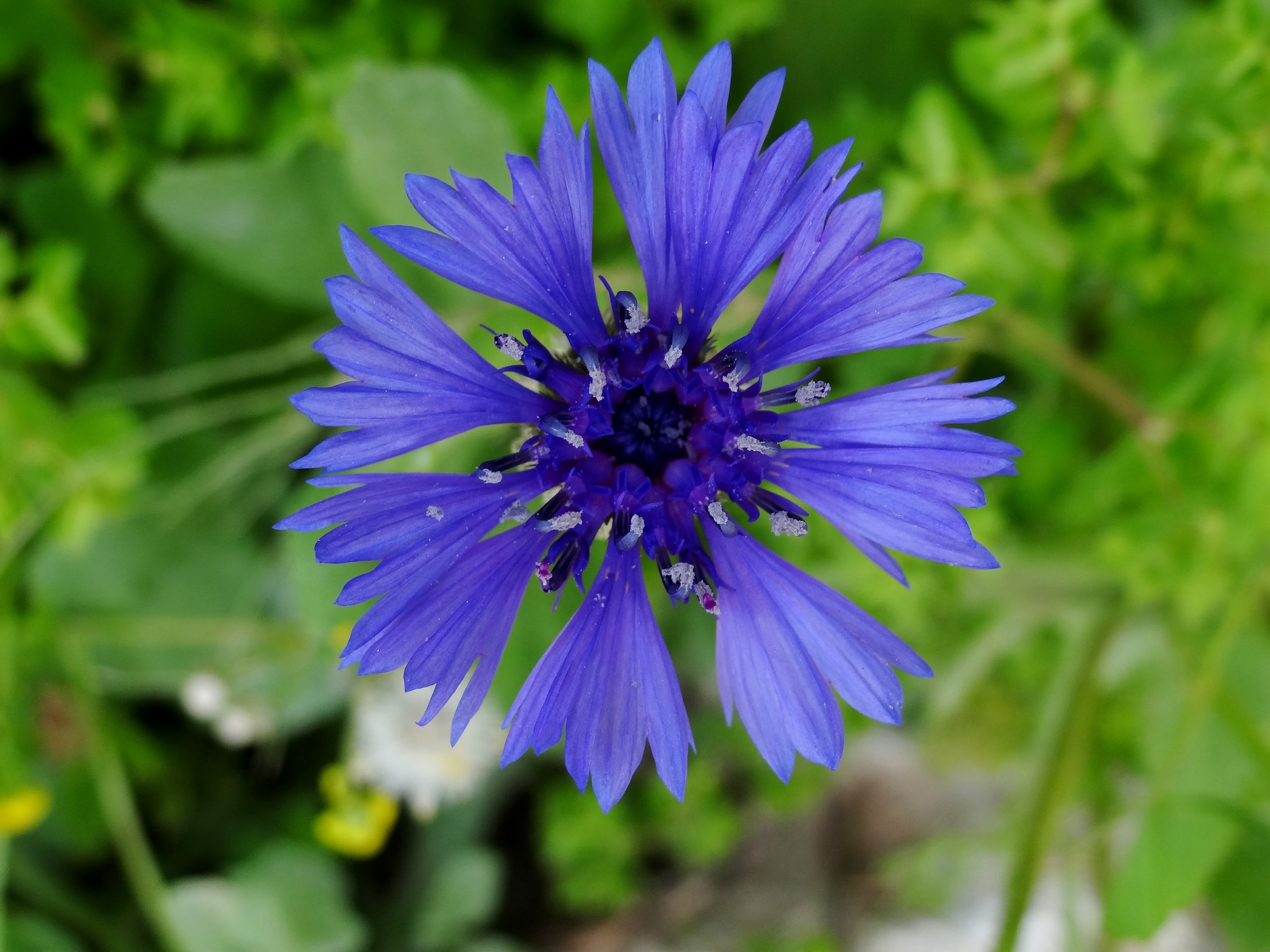

Scientific classification
- Kingdom: Plantae
- Clade: Tracheophytes
- Clade: Angiosperms
- Clade: Eudicots
- Clade: Asterids
- Order: Asterales
- Family: Asteraceae
- Genus: Centaurea
- Species: C. cyanoides

Binomial name
- Centaurea cyanoides Wahlenb.

Synonyms
- Cyanus cyanoides (Berggr. & Wahlenb.) Wagenitz & Greuter

= Centaurea cyanoides =

Plant species

Centaurea cyanoides, the Syrian cornflower, is a species of Centaurea. It is native to Cyprus, Israel, Jordan, Lebanon, and Syria.

Centaurea cyanoides looks similar to the European cornflower Centaurea cyanus although C.cyanoides is much smaller, only 2-3 cm wide. It grows only in wild areas and is not in cultivated fields. It is native to the Middle East.
