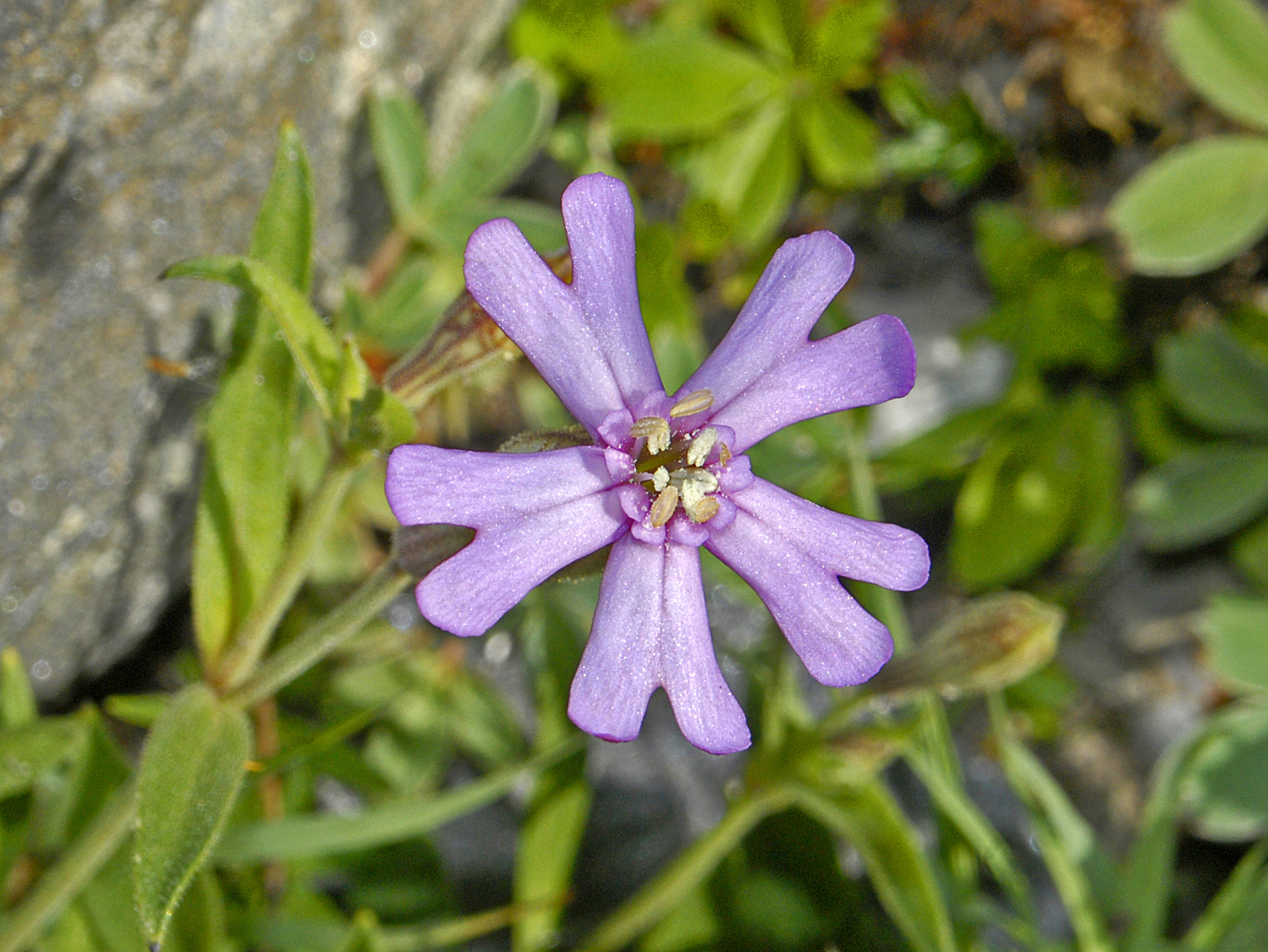
- Flower of Silene vallesia at the Giardino Botanico Alpino Chanousia

Scientific classification
- Kingdom: Plantae
- Clade: Tracheophytes
- Clade: Angiosperms
- Clade: Eudicots
- Order: Caryophyllales
- Family: Caryophyllaceae
- Genus: Silene
- Species: S. vallesia

Binomial name
- Silene vallesia L.

= Silene vallesia =

Species of flowering plant

Silene vallesia, common name Valais catchfly, is a species of flowering plant in the family Caryophyllaceae.

== Description ==
Silene vallesia can reach a height of 5–15 centimetres (2.0–5.9 in). It is a perennial pubescent sticky plant with ascending flowering stems. Leaves are oblong-lanceolate, opposite, gradually smaller, 1–3 centimetres (0.39–1.18 in) long. Inflorescence is a raceme with only 1-3 flowers, 2–2.5 centimetres (0.79–0.98 in) long. The petals are pale pink, bifid, with deep oval lobes. Flowers bloom from June to August.

== Distribution ==
This species is widespread throughout the western Alps to Apennines.

== Habitat ==
This plant grows in rocky areas, rocky pastures and slopes at elevation of 900–2,500 metres (3,000–8,200 ft) above sea level.
