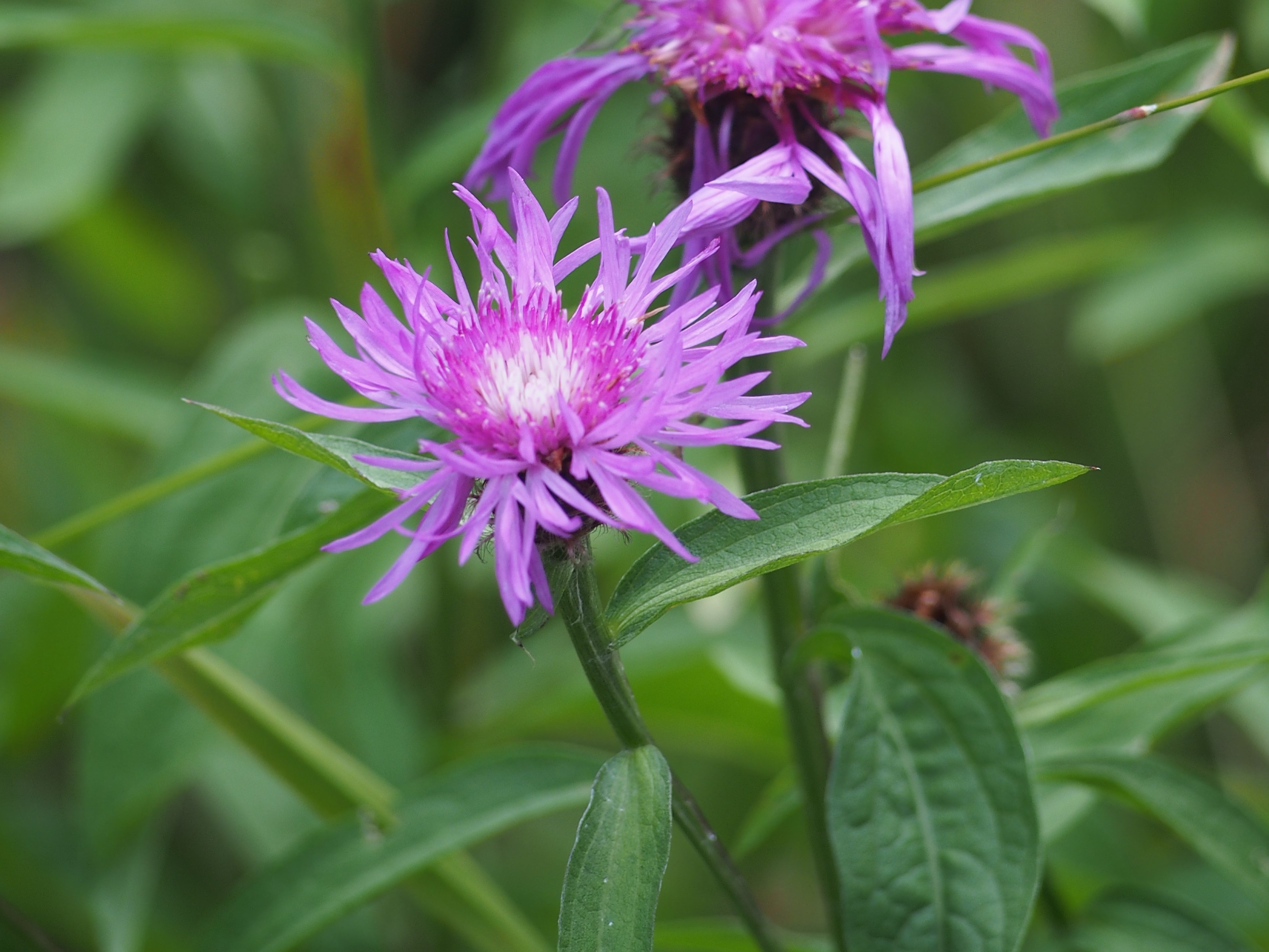

Scientific classification
- Kingdom: Plantae
- Clade: Tracheophytes
- Clade: Angiosperms
- Clade: Eudicots
- Clade: Asterids
- Order: Asterales
- Family: Asteraceae
- Genus: Centaurea
- Species: C. oxylepis

Binomial name
- Centaurea oxylepis (Wimm. & Grab.) Hayek

Synonyms
- Centaurea jacea subsp. oxylepis (Wimm. & Grab.) Hayek

= Centaurea oxylepis =

Species of flowering plant

Centaurea oxylepis is a species of perennial flowering plant in the family Asteraceae. Its native occurrence ranges from Poland to Czechia and Slovakia to Romania.
