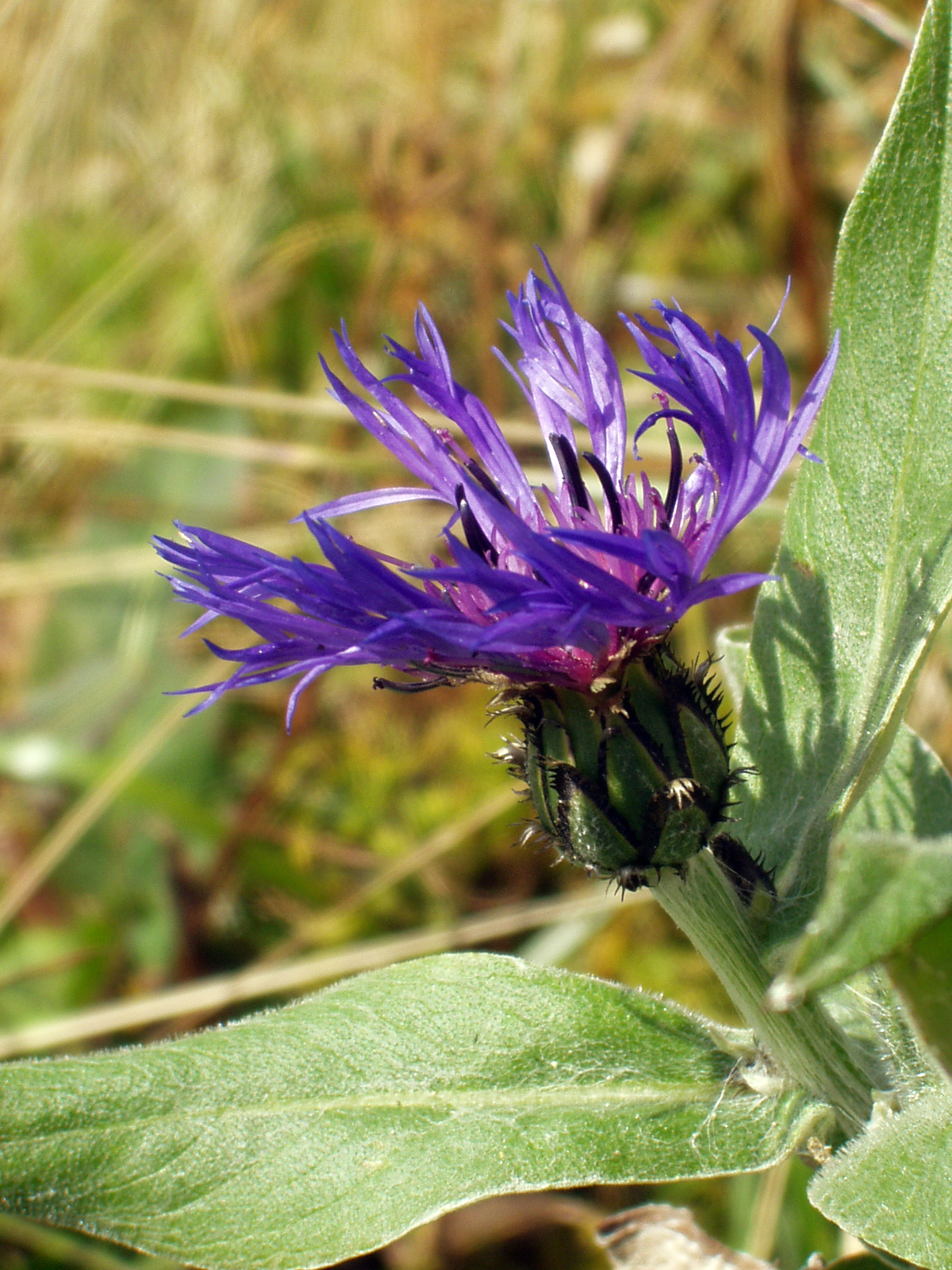

Scientific classification
- Kingdom: Plantae
- Clade: Tracheophytes
- Clade: Angiosperms
- Clade: Eudicots
- Clade: Asterids
- Order: Asterales
- Family: Asteraceae
- Genus: Centaurea
- Species: C. montana

Binomial name
- Centaurea montana L.

Synonyms
- Cyanus montanus L. (Hill); Centaurea angustifolia Mill.; Centaurea mollis Waldst. & Kit

= Centaurea montana =

Species of plant

Centaurea montana, the perennial cornflower, mountain cornflower, bachelor's button, montane knapweed or mountain bluet, is a species of flowering plant in the family Asteraceae, endemic to Europe. It is widespread and common in the more southerly mountain ranges of Europe, but is rarer in the north. It escapes from gardens readily, and has thereby become established in the British Isles, Scandinavia and North America. This plant has become an invasive species in British Columbia, Canada. Centaurea montana grows in meadows and open woodland in the upper montane and sub-alpine zones, in basic areas. It grows to 30–70 centimetres (12–28 in) tall, and flowers mainly from May to August.

Centaurea montana may be distinguished from other Centaurea species in the region by its usually entire leaves, and the blue-purple colour of the outermost ray florets. It may be distinguished from the cornflower, Centaurea cyanus, by having a single (rarely up to three) flower heads, and by its being perennial, whereas the cornflower has many flower heads and is annual. The closely related C. triumfettii has more narrowly winged stems, narrower leaves and grows in rockier areas.

== Taxonomy ==
The Latin specific epithet montana refers to mountains or coming from mountains.

== Ornamental use ==
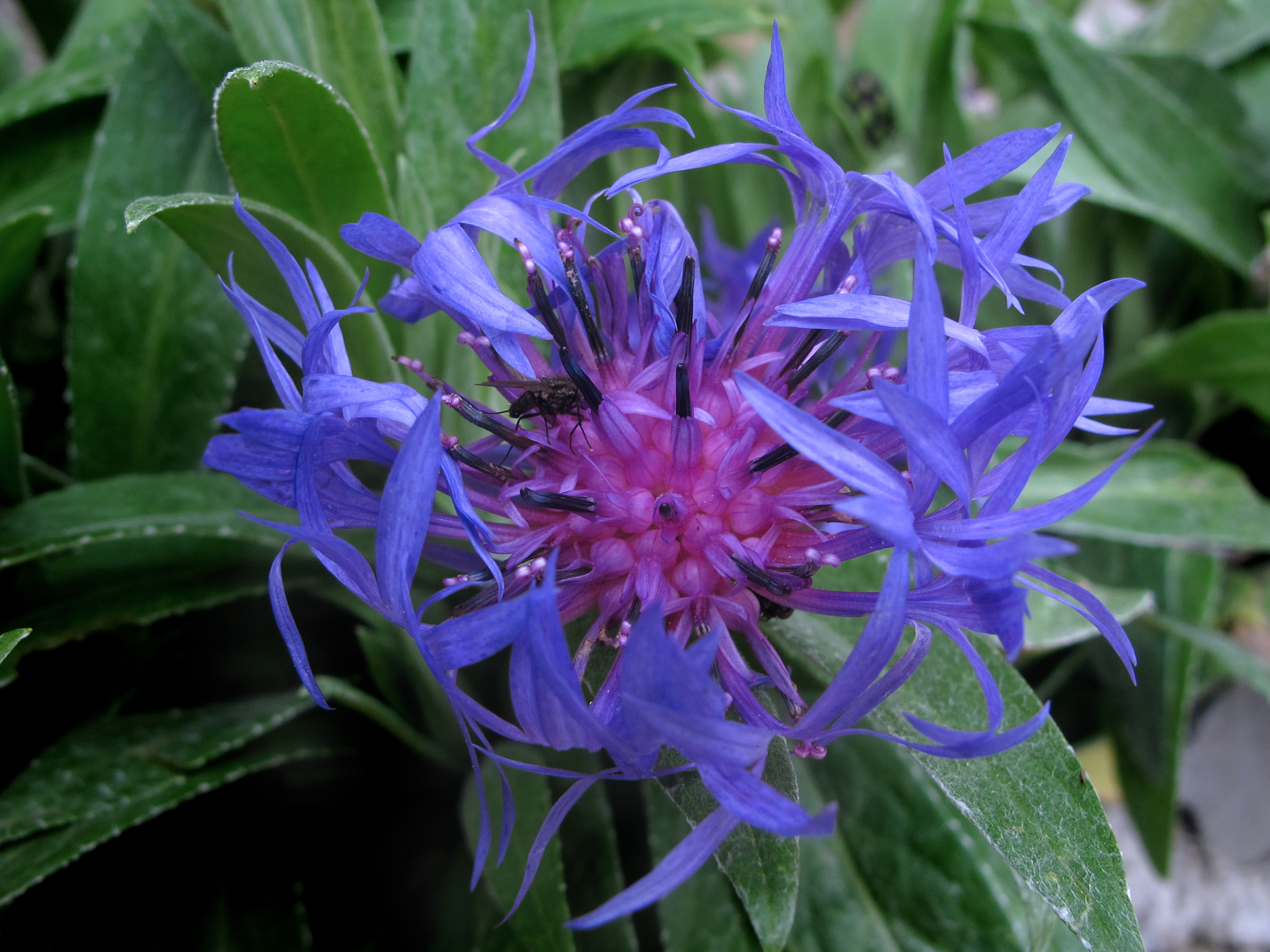

Centaurea montana grows in gardens where it grows best in sunny positions. It tolerates some light shade. Since the plant is evergreen it can use the light in winter and early spring when deciduous trees and shrubs have no leaves. It tolerates deciduous shade better than evergreen shade and prepares to flower while deciduous plants are bare. Therefore, it can flower reasonably well in light deciduous shade. If the plant is dug up, a new plant can eventually regenerate from small pieces of root left in the soil. Centaurea montana grows well in soils varying from light sand to heavy clay. The plant also grows well in acid, neutral or very alkaline soils. It tolerates drought but cannot tolerate waterlogged conditions. The Royal Horticultural Society considers it a good plant to attract pollinators, and it is widely available from commercial suppliers.

This plant is inedible; however, it is considered to be a medicinal plant in Central Europe.
