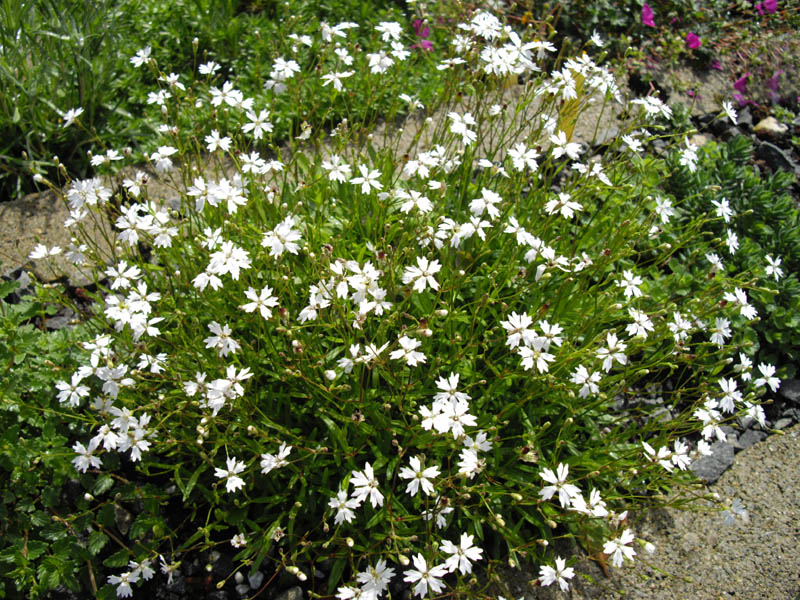

Scientific classification
- Kingdom: Plantae
- Clade: Tracheophytes
- Clade: Angiosperms
- Clade: Eudicots
- Order: Caryophyllales
- Family: Caryophyllaceae
- Genus: Silene
- Species: S. alpestris

Binomial name
- Silene alpestris Jacq.

= Silene alpestris =

Species of flowering plant

Silene alpestris, the alpine catch-fly, is a species of flowering plant in the pink family Caryophyllaceae, native to Europe in the mountains of Italy, Austria, Slovenia and Croatia. This spreading, mat-forming evergreen perennial grows to 15 centimetres (6 inches) tall by 30 cm (12 in) broad. It produces masses of tiny white flowers over a long period in spring and summer.

A double-flowered cultivar, 'Flore Pleno', has received the Royal Horticultural Society's Award of Garden Merit. 'Starry Dreams' is a more floriferous cultivar than the species. All forms are suitable subjects for an alpine garden or rock garden with good drainage. Alkaline or neutral soils are preferred.

Some authorities regard S. alpestris as a synonym of Heliosperma alpestre.

== See also ==
- List of Silene species
