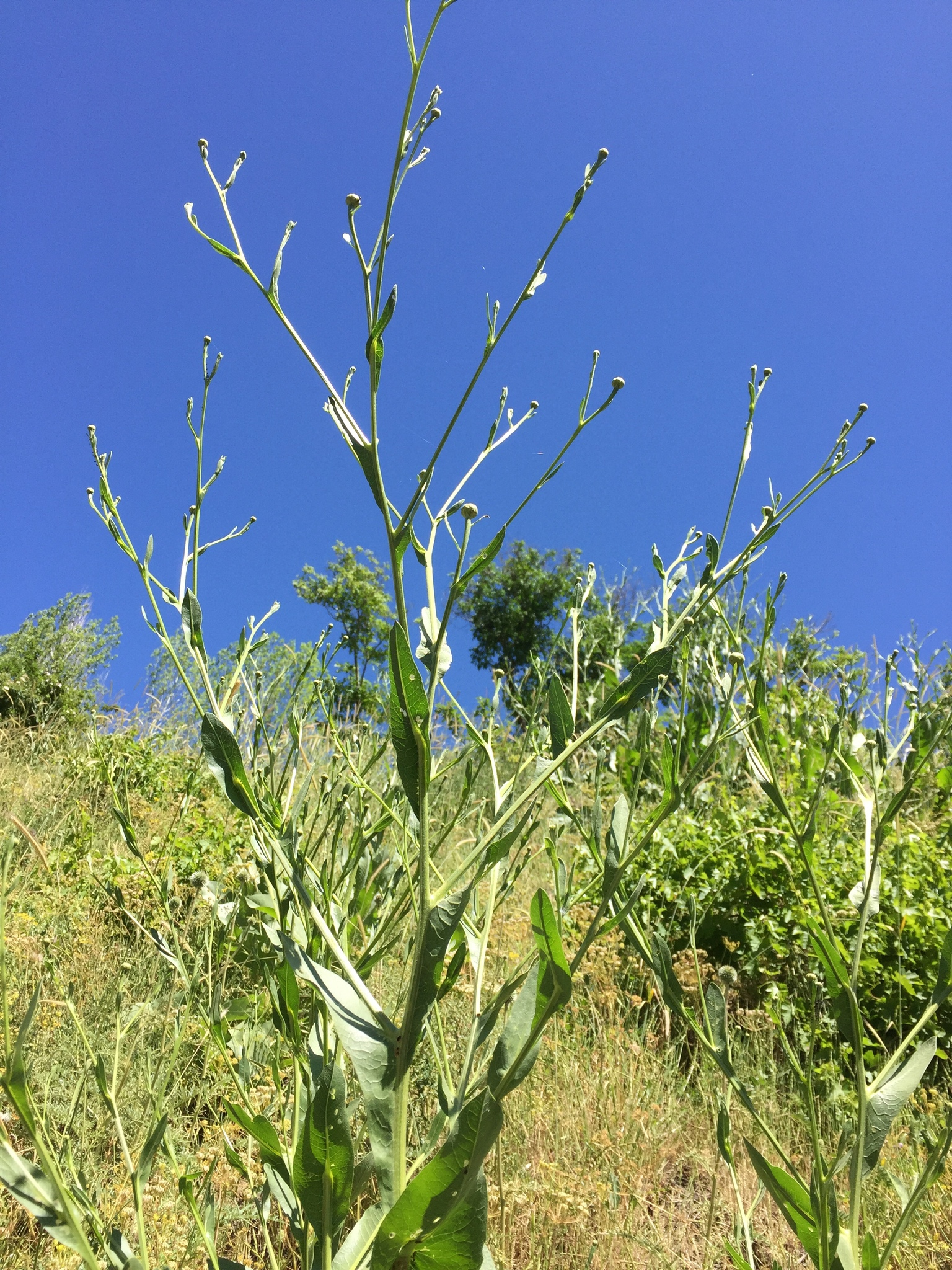
- In Armenia

Scientific classification
- Kingdom: Plantae
- Clade: Tracheophytes
- Clade: Angiosperms
- Clade: Eudicots
- Clade: Asterids
- Order: Asterales
- Family: Asteraceae
- Genus: Centaurea
- Species: C. behen

Binomial name
- Centaurea behen L.

= Centaurea behen =

Species of flowering plant

Centaurea behen is a species of Centaurea that grows in the wild under full sun in northern Iraq and Armenia and in many other areas of Western and Central Asia with a roughly similar environment, stretching from Lebanon to Kazakhstan.

The plant's leaves near ground-level are relatively large, comparable to broad dock or spinach leaves. Rising above those leaves are branching stalks that carry much smaller lightweight leaves and, when in flower, small yellow flowers. Including the upper stalks, the plant is typically a little less than a meter high off the ground. The plant has multiple thick roots. The roots have a brown skin on the outside and a white color internally. The roots come to commerce in a dried form, looking shrivelled, and then are ground to a powder, and used for several traditional herbal medicine purposes. The roots are called Behman Safed, also known as White Behmen, Safaid Behmen, in Ayurvedic Indian medicine.

The plant is grown under cultivation in northern India for the medicinal use of its roots.
