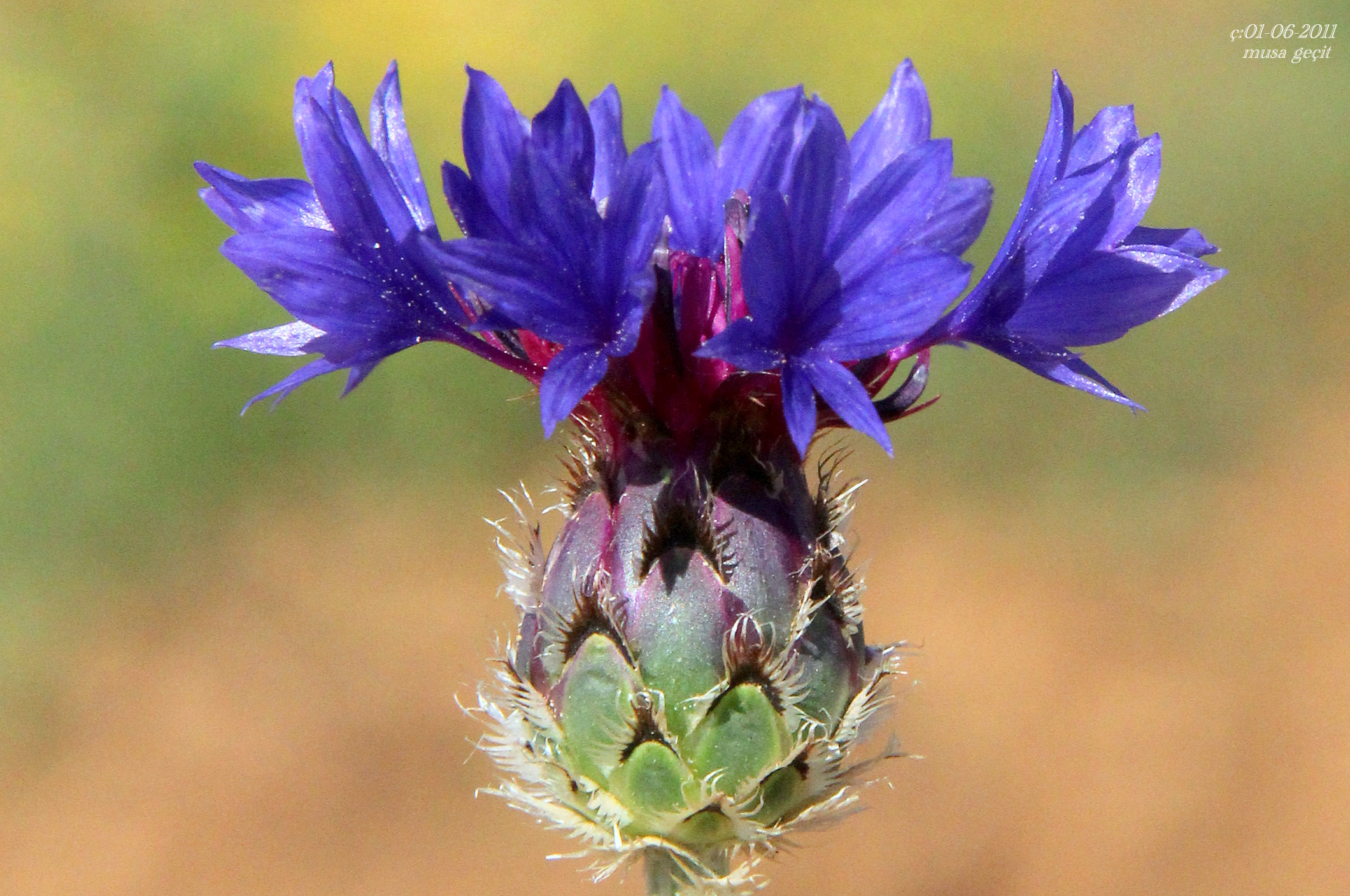

Scientific classification
- Kingdom: Plantae
- Clade: Tracheophytes
- Clade: Angiosperms
- Clade: Eudicots
- Clade: Asterids
- Order: Asterales
- Family: Asteraceae
- Genus: Centaurea
- Species: C. depressa

Binomial name
- Centaurea depressa M. Bieberstein

= Centaurea depressa =

Species of flowering plant

Centaurea depressa, the low cornflower, is a species of Centaurea. It is native to southwestern and central Asia. Its common name is Iranian knapweed. The plant grows to 0.3 m (1 ft) tall and flowers from July to August. It can grow in nutritionally poor soil and is drought tolerant.

== Description ==
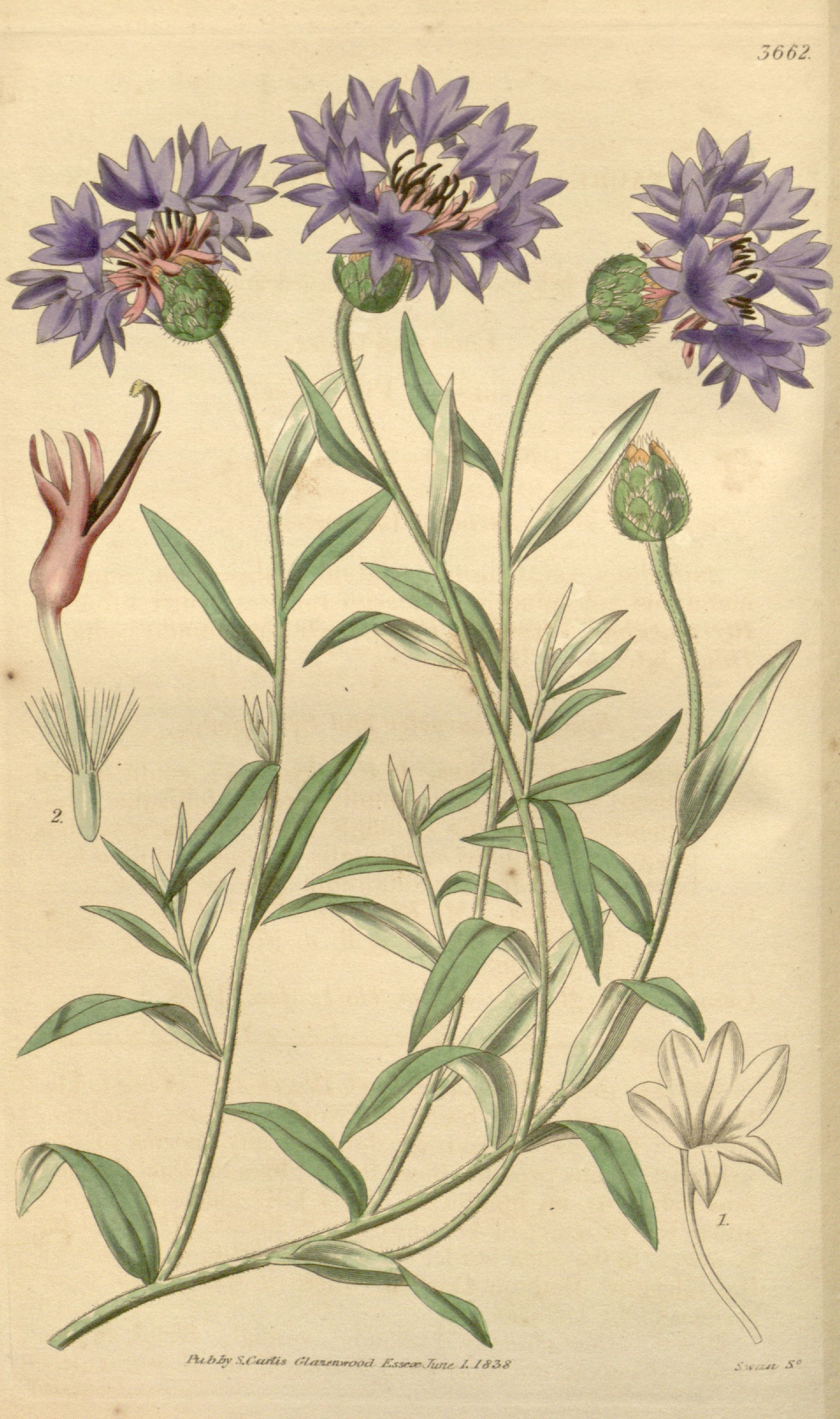
Diagram

Centaurea depressa is an annual plant that grows from 20 to 60 cm tall. Several stems grow from the base of the plant. They are openly branched and have a gray color with short hairs. The leaves are oblong blades that grow 5–10 cm long and have fine hairs on them. The florets are a dark blue.
