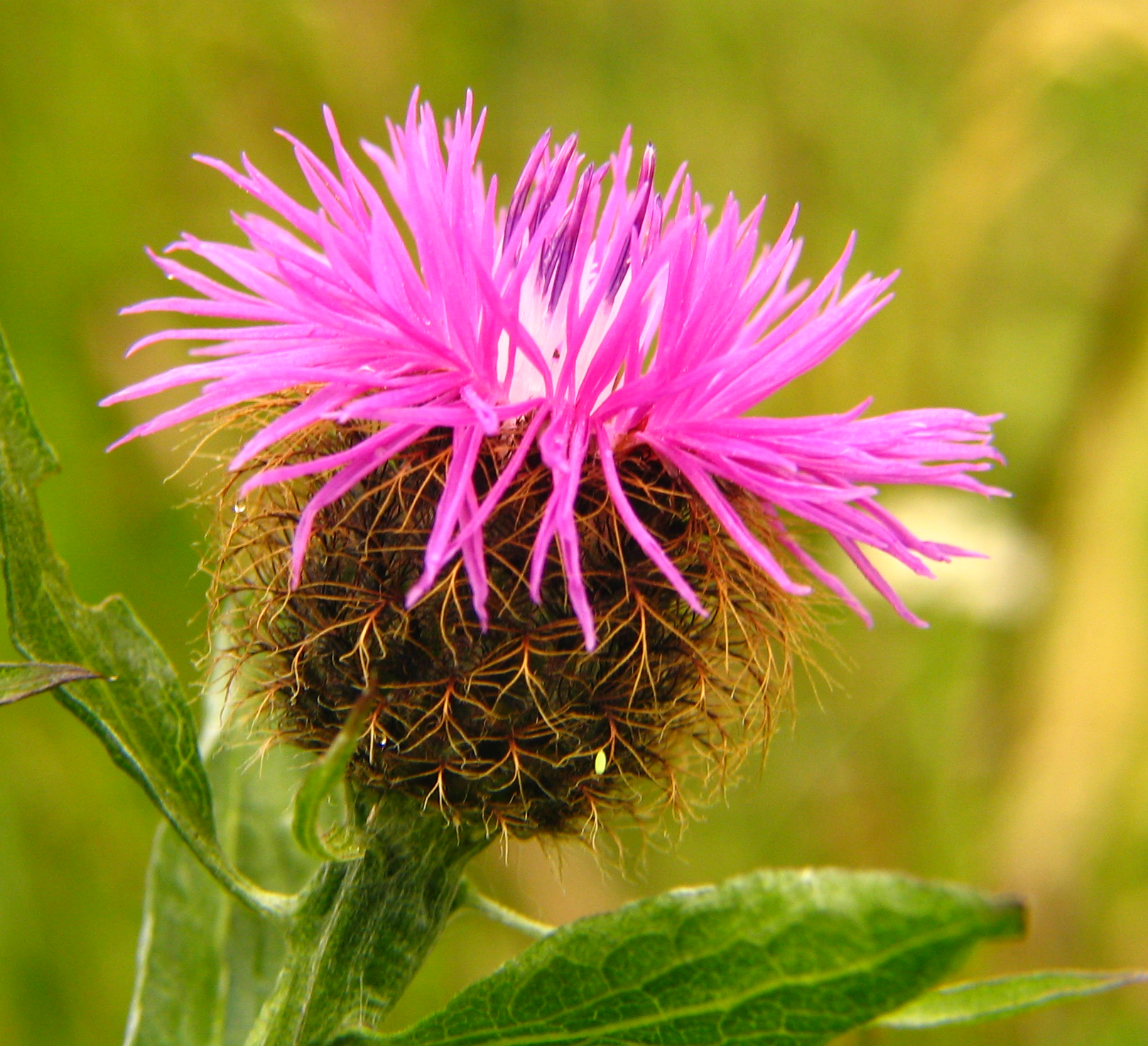

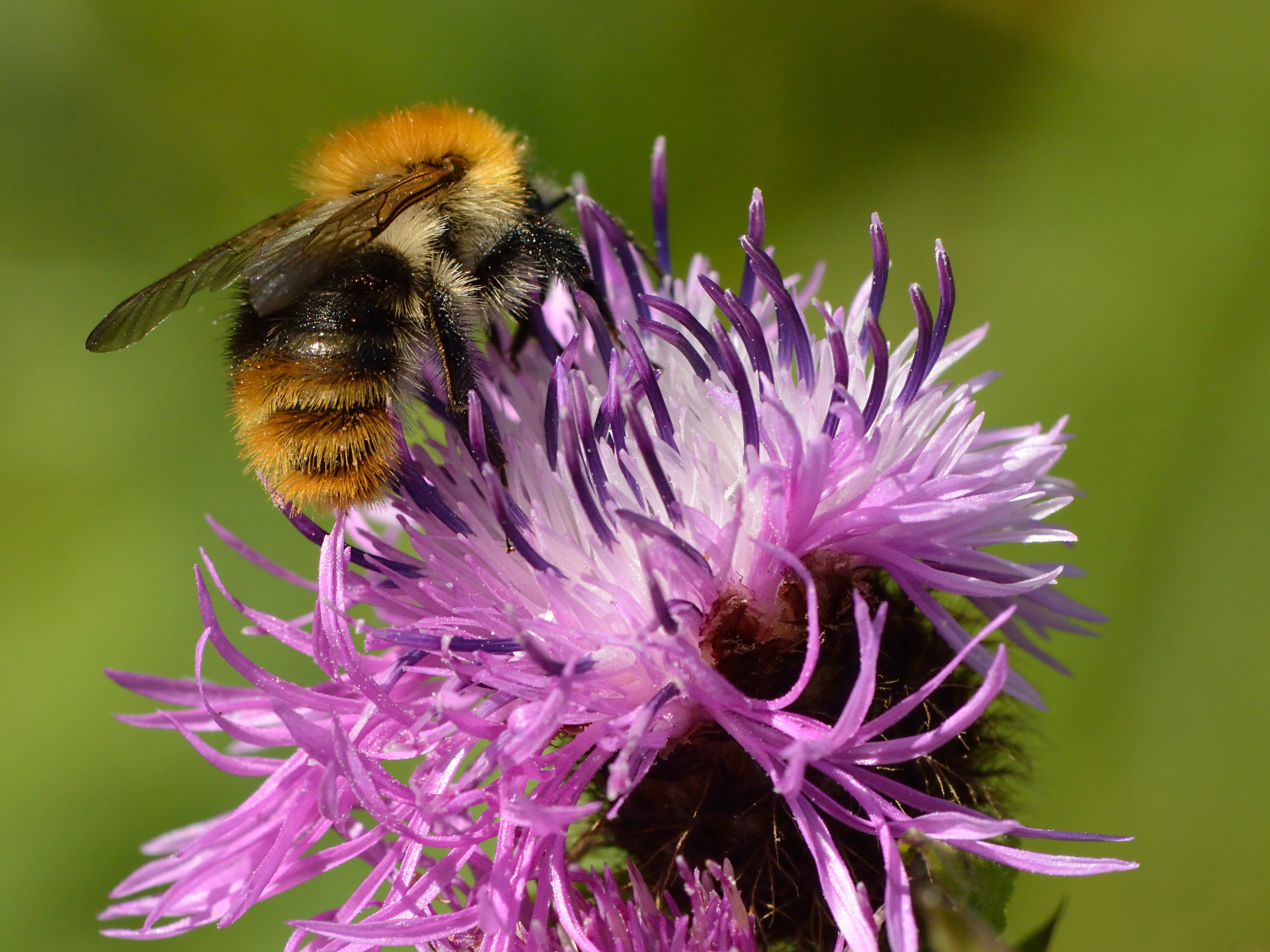

Scientific classification
- Kingdom: Plantae
- Clade: Tracheophytes
- Clade: Angiosperms
- Clade: Eudicots
- Clade: Asterids
- Order: Asterales
- Family: Asteraceae
- Genus: Centaurea
- Species: C. phrygia

Binomial name
- Centaurea phrygia L.

= Centaurea phrygia =

Species of flowering plant

Centaurea phrygia, commonly called wig knapweed, is a species of Centaurea. It is native to Europe.
