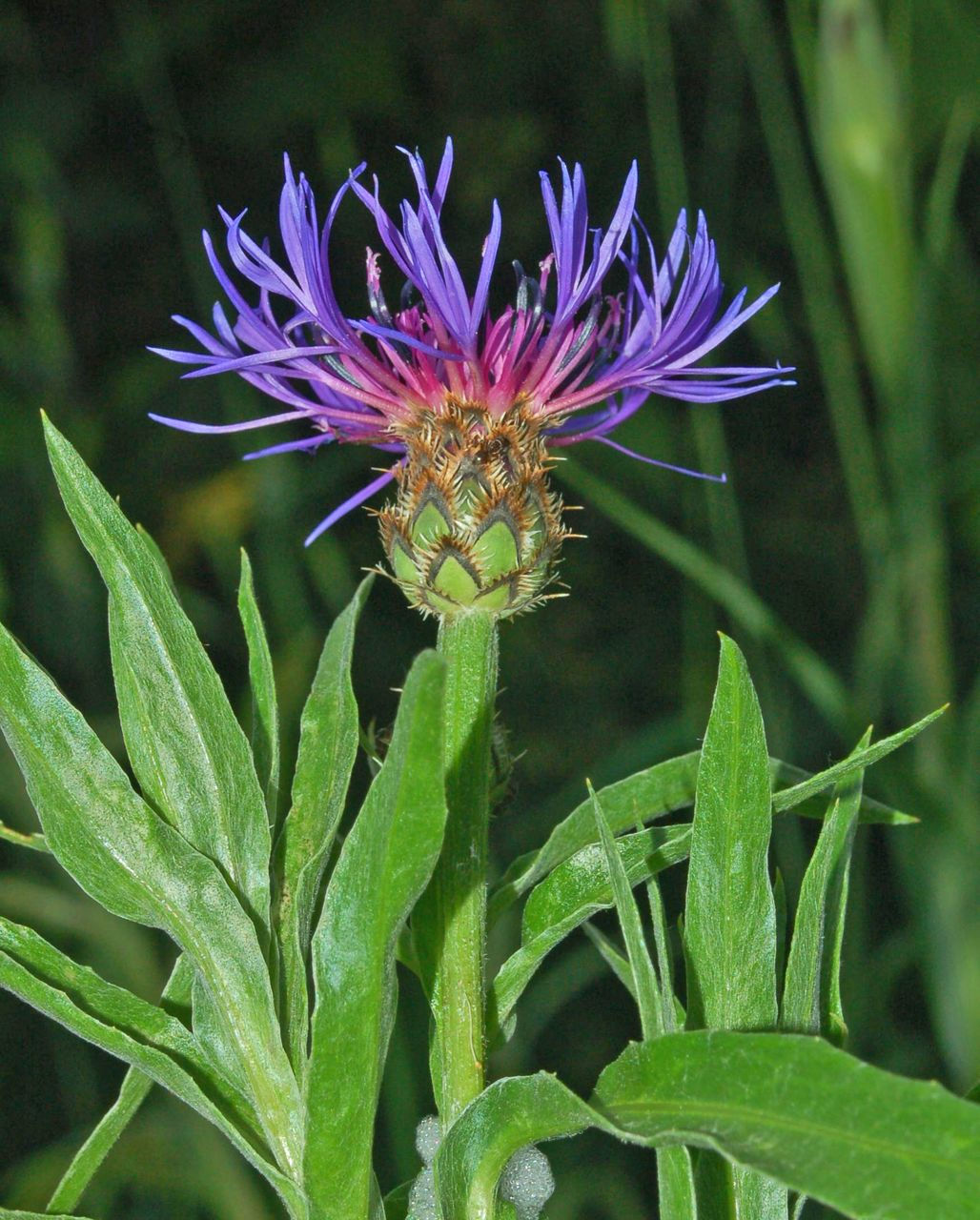

Scientific classification
- Kingdom: Plantae
- Clade: Tracheophytes
- Clade: Angiosperms
- Clade: Eudicots
- Clade: Asterids
- Order: Asterales
- Family: Asteraceae
- Genus: Centaurea
- Species: C. triumfettii

Binomial name
- Centaurea triumfettii All.

Synonyms
- Centaurea squarrosa Willd.; Centaurea virgata Lam.; Centaurea virgata var. squarrosa (Willd.) Boiss.; Cyanus triumfettii (All.) Å. Löve & D. Löve; Centaurea triumfetti

= Centaurea triumfettii =

Species of flowering plant

Centaurea triumfettii, the squarrose knapweed, is a species of plant belonging to the genus Centaurea of the family Asteraceae.

== Description ==
The squarrose knapweed is an herbaceous perennial plant. This plant grows to a height of about 30–60 centimetres (12–24 in). The leaves are undivided and narrow-lanceolate. The period of flowering is from May until August. The inner flowers are bright purple, the outer ones are azure blue or deep mauve.

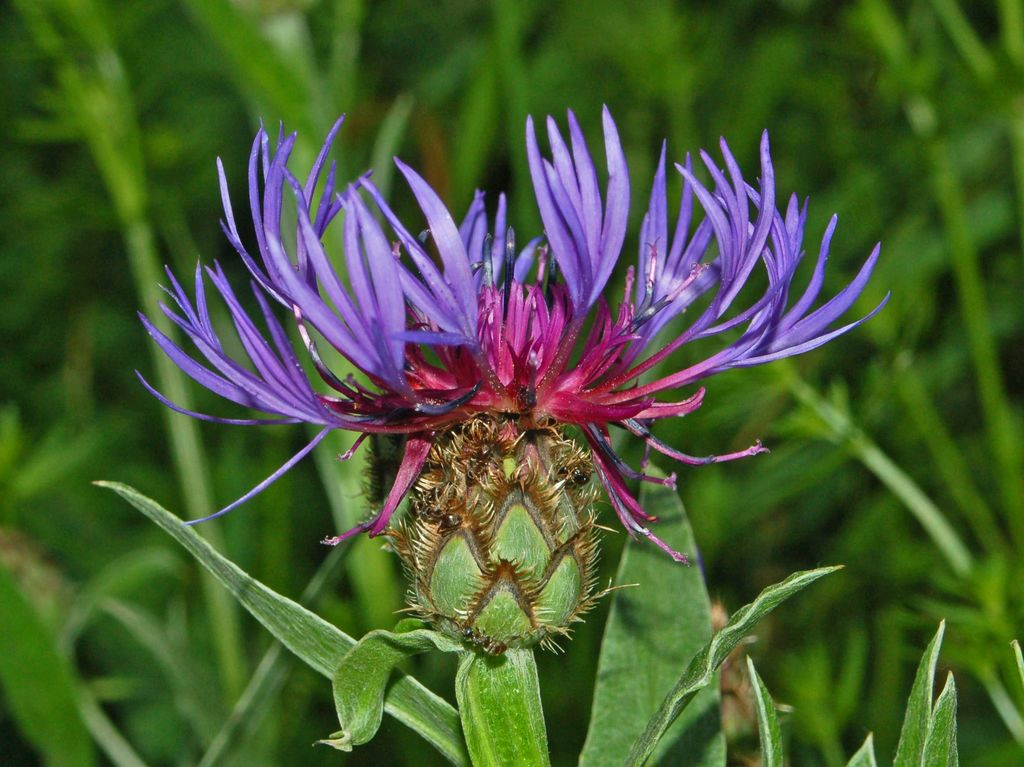
Flower head of Centaurea triumfettii

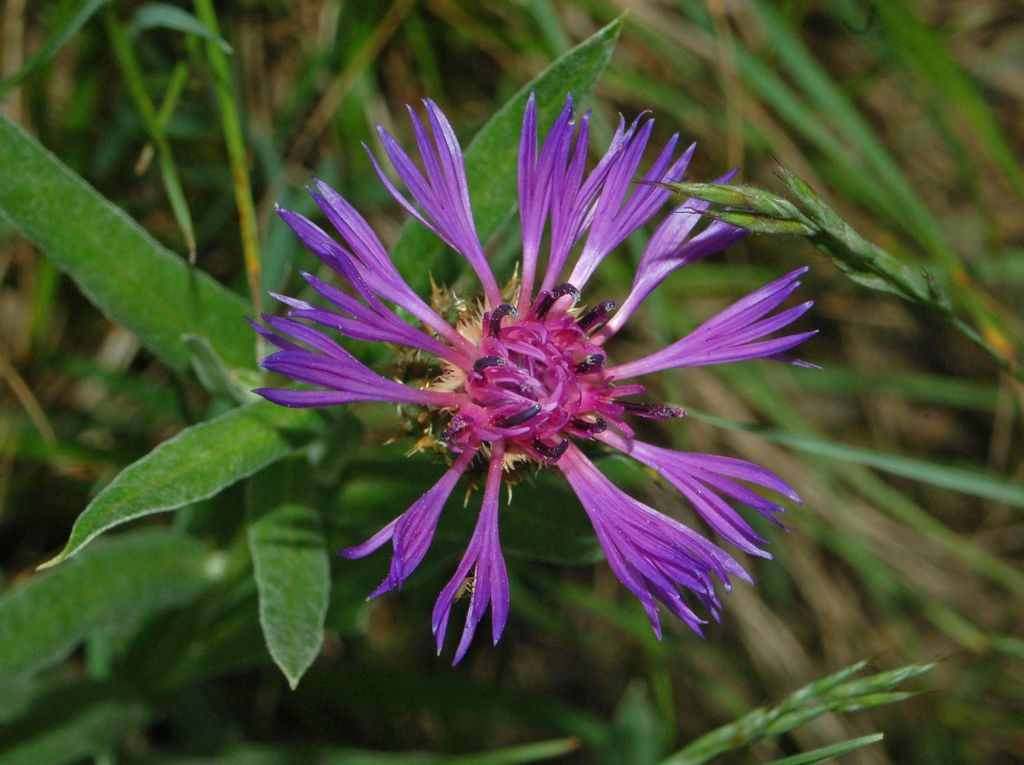
Flower head of Centaurea triumfettii

== Distribution ==
This species occurs in Afghanistan, Armenia, Austria, Canada, Czech Republic, France, Germany, Greece, Hungary, Iceland, Iran, Israel, Italy, Lebanon, Mexico, Norway, Poland, Romania, Slovakia, Spain, Sweden, Turkey Turkmenistan and United States.

== Habitat ==
Centaurea triumfettii prefers dry and sunny places, in deciduous bushes, on meadows and subalpine grass slopes. The soil should be chalky. The species thrives at altitudes up to 2000 m above sea level. It is widespread in the mountains of southern and central Europe. Occasionally they are found as ornamental plants in gardens and parks.
