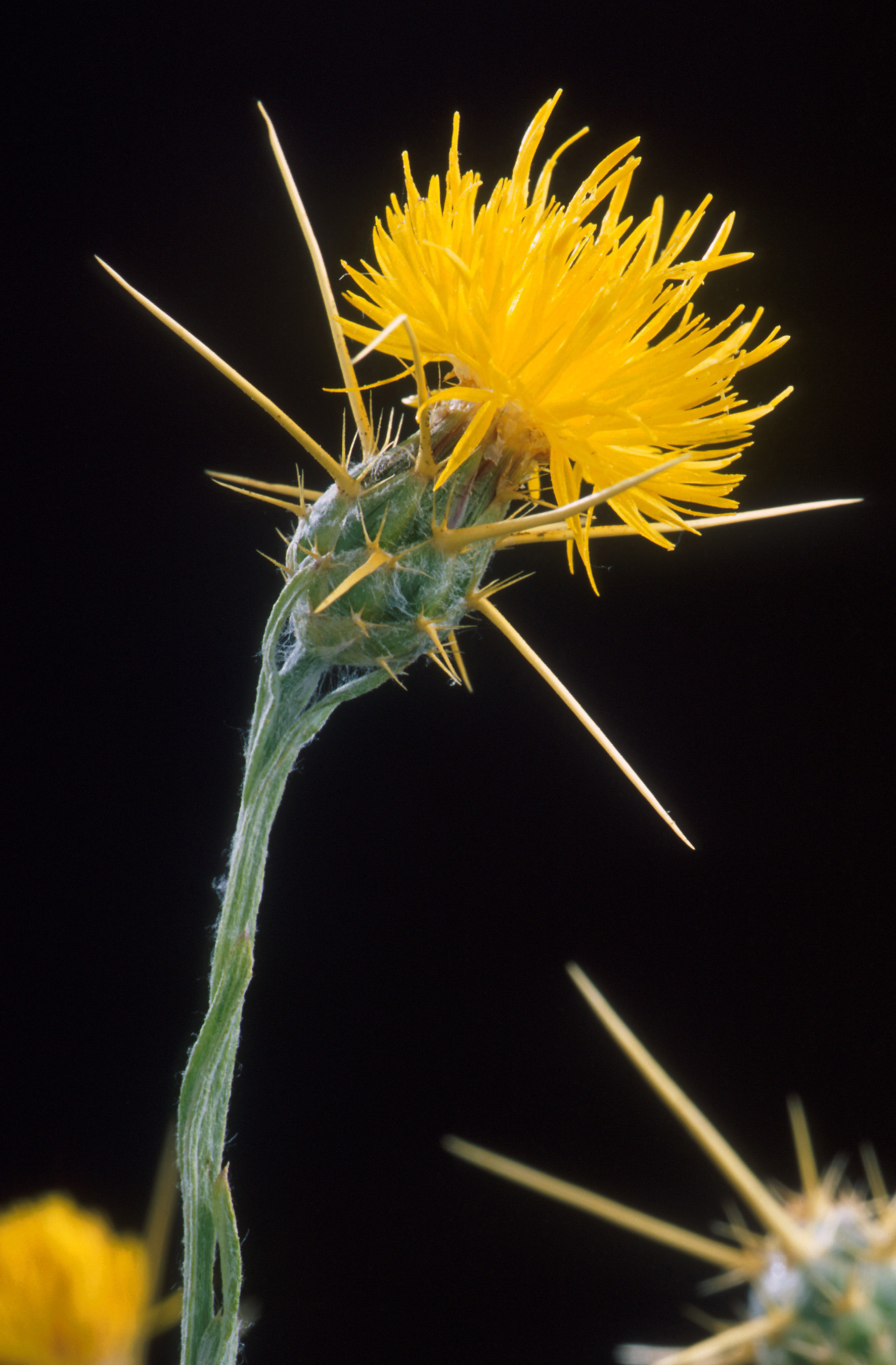
- Yellow star-thistle flower

Scientific classification
- Kingdom: Plantae
- Clade: Embryophytes
- Clade: Tracheophytes
- Clade: Angiosperms
- Clade: Eudicots
- Clade: Asterids
- Order: Asterales
- Family: Asteraceae
- Genus: Centaurea
- Species: C. solstitialis

Binomial name
- Centaurea solstitialis L.

= Centaurea solstitialis =

Yellow star-thistle

Species of flowering plant

Centaurea solstitialis, the yellow star-thistle, is a species of thorny plant in the genus Centaurea, which is part of the family Asteraceae. A winter annual, it is native to the Mediterranean Basin region and invasive in many other places. It is also known as golden starthistle, yellow cockspur and St. Barnaby's thistle (or Barnaby thistle).

== Description ==
Centaurea solstitialis is an annual herb from the family Asteraceae. During the vegetative stage it forms a rosette of non-spiny leaves, between 5–20 centimetres (2–8 inches) in diameter. As the summer approaches, it produces a flowering stem up to 1 metre (3 1/2 feet) in height. The leaves at the base are lobed and range between 5–8 cm (2–3 in) in length, while the ones on the stem are unlobed and smaller. Between May and October, the stem produces numerous spinous flower heads (capitula) about 12–16 millimetres (1/2–5/8 in) across, containing between 10 and 50 yellow flowers, with spines between 1–2.5 cm (3/8–1 in). Flowers within capitula are pollinated by insects and each capitula produces 10–50 seeds, some with and some without a pappus. It is an annual semelparous species, and will die after reproduction is completed, normally by the end of the summer.

=== Similar species ===
Similar species include purple star-thistle (Centaurea calcitrapa), sulphur star-thistle (C. sulphurea), Maltese star-thistle (C. melitensis), and rough star-thistle (C. aspera). Bachelor's button (C. cyaneus) is a relative.

== Ecology ==
Centaurea solstitialis is considered a weed also on its native European range (e.g., Turkey, Greece, Italy, France, Spain). Consequently, it inhabits highly disturbed ruderal habitats, being typically found on roadsides and cereal crop margins. After introduction in several parts of the world as an exotic species (e.g., Australia, Argentina, Chile, the United States), it has developed local adaptations to the different habitats colonized, and an incipient level of reproductive isolation between native and non-native ranges has been detected—a case of ecological speciation.

Star-thistle is a valuable source of pollen, thus nectar for pollinators. Yellow star-thistle, a noted pest plant in California, is a major nectar source for many butterflies of the state's central valleys and foothills. Star-thistle populates ground that has been abused: dry, compacted, or scraped clean. A plant with a taproot system, it has a crucial role in restoring the soil by bringing up vital micronutrients. Similar to many plants classified as 'weeds', they (in the words of Mark Schonbeck) "quickly establish in, protect, and restore soil that has been left exposed by natural and human-caused disturbances".

C. solstitialis grows as a balanced part of the ecosystems in Eurasia, where it is kept in check by an assortment of natural herbivore enemies and other plants that have co-evolved with it in its native habitat. However, it has been introduced in several parts of the world, including Australia, Argentina, Chile, and the U.S. In many of these non-native regions, where the particular array of natural biological controls found in the native regions do not exist, it has become an invasive species and noxious weed.

The yellow star-thistle plant has the ability to create monotypic stands and habitats in the cultivated soil of fields, graded dirt sites, and disturbed natural ecosystem lands. Its colonization eliminates and prevents other plant species from growing, terminating the habitat's biodiversity. Extensive spreading monotypic fields of yellow star-thistle are not uncommon. Its growth plasticity, competitiveness, preference for the Mediterranean climate, and a lack of natural herbivore enemies and co-evolved species, make it a very successful invader. The plant is an invasive pest in field crops, degrades native plant habitats and natural ecosystems, prevents the grazing of domestic animals in rangelands, and is a physical barrier to indigenous animal movement in wildlands.

=== As an invasive species ===
The introduction of C. solstitialis in North America probably occurred in California sometime after the start of the California Gold Rush, as a fodder seed contaminant in imported Chilean-harvested alfalfa seed, also known as Chilean clover (Trifolium macraei). Star-thistle has been introduced throughout North and South America, Africa, and Europe.

In California, yellow star-thistle was dispersed into agricultural fields and immediately took hold in the state's areas with a Mediterranean climate. Human factors, such as mowing, land grading for development and roads, domestic animal grazing, and disturbance of the soil surface for agricultural tillage and wildland firebreaks have and continue to contribute to the successful thriving and spread of this plant. Yellow star-thistle is now a very common sight in vacant lots and fields, along roadsides and trails, in pastures and ranch lands, and in parks, open-space preserves and natural areas.

After the turn of the 20th century, Spain, France, Italy, and perhaps Turkestan were also likely sources of the invasion's seed in California. Since its introduction to California in the mid-19th century, it has become a large-scale invasive species (noxious weed or invasive exotic) throughout 23 U.S. states. It currently dominates over 15,000,000 acres (61,000 square kilometres) in California alone.

By 1970, yellow star-thistle had reached 23 U.S. states. According to the U.S. Forest Service, as of 2006 the plant has been reported present in 41 of the 48 contiguous U.S. states, with the only exceptions being Maine, Vermont, and five of the Deep South states (Arkansas, Louisiana, Mississippi, Alabama, and Georgia). The plant is considered an invasive species in six of the 41 states: California, Oregon, Washington, Idaho, Utah, and New Jersey.

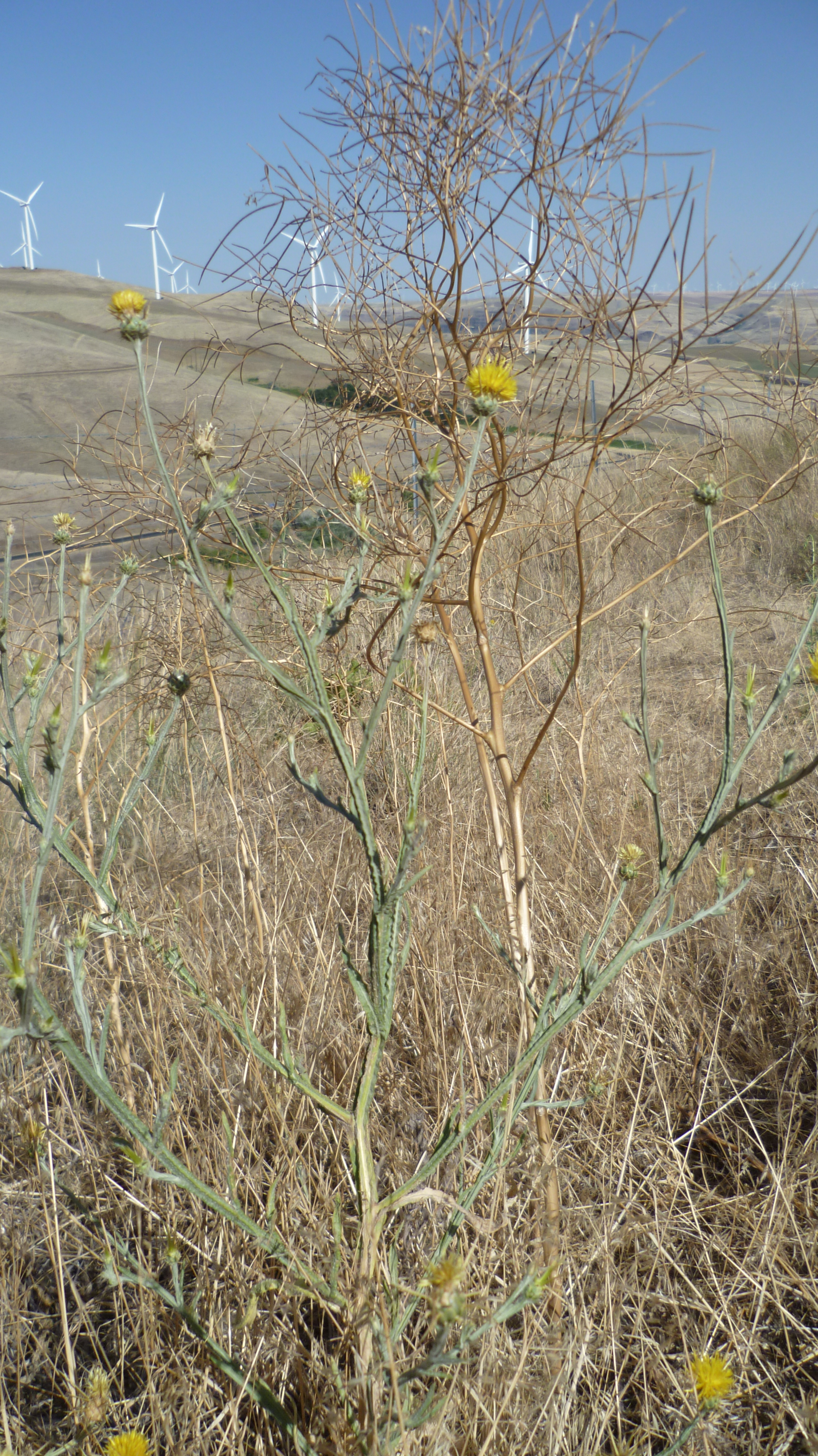
C. solstitialis in Klickitat County, Washington

==== Chemical control ====
Most herbicides used for controlling yellow star-thistle are registered for range lands, right-of-way, and other non-crop areas. Many auxin-like or growth-regulator herbicides are used for post-emergence control, including 2,4-D, aminopyralid, clopyralid, dicamba, picloram and triclopyr. In California, aminopyralid, which has both post- and preemergence activity, is the most commonly used, most effectively after an early summer prescribed burn. Alternatively, glyphosate may be used. Pre-emergence herbicides used for yellow star-thistle control include chlorsulfuron and sulfometuron. Pre-emergence and post-emergence herbicides may be used effectively together to kill growing plants as well as any new seedlings that may emerge from the copious soil seed bank often produced by yellow star-thistle. Controlled burning may also be used in conjunction with clopyralid application as an effective integrated approach to yellow star-thistle management.

Aminocyclopyrachlor + chlorsulfuron, aminopyralid, chlorsulfuron, clopyralid, clopyralid + 2,4-D, dicamba, diflufenzopyr + dicamba, picloram, and triclopyr + clopyralid for the Pacific Northwest of North America.

A yellow star-thistle biotype resistant to picloram was discovered in a pasture near Dayton, Ohio, in 1988. This biotype was determined to have cross resistance to other auxin-like herbicides, especially clopyralid. Resistance was discovered to be conveyed by a single nuclear recessive gene.

Picloram-resistant C. solstitialis has been observed which had cross-resistance to clopyralid, dicamba, and fluroxypyr, but not triclopyr or 2,4-D.

==== Biological control ====
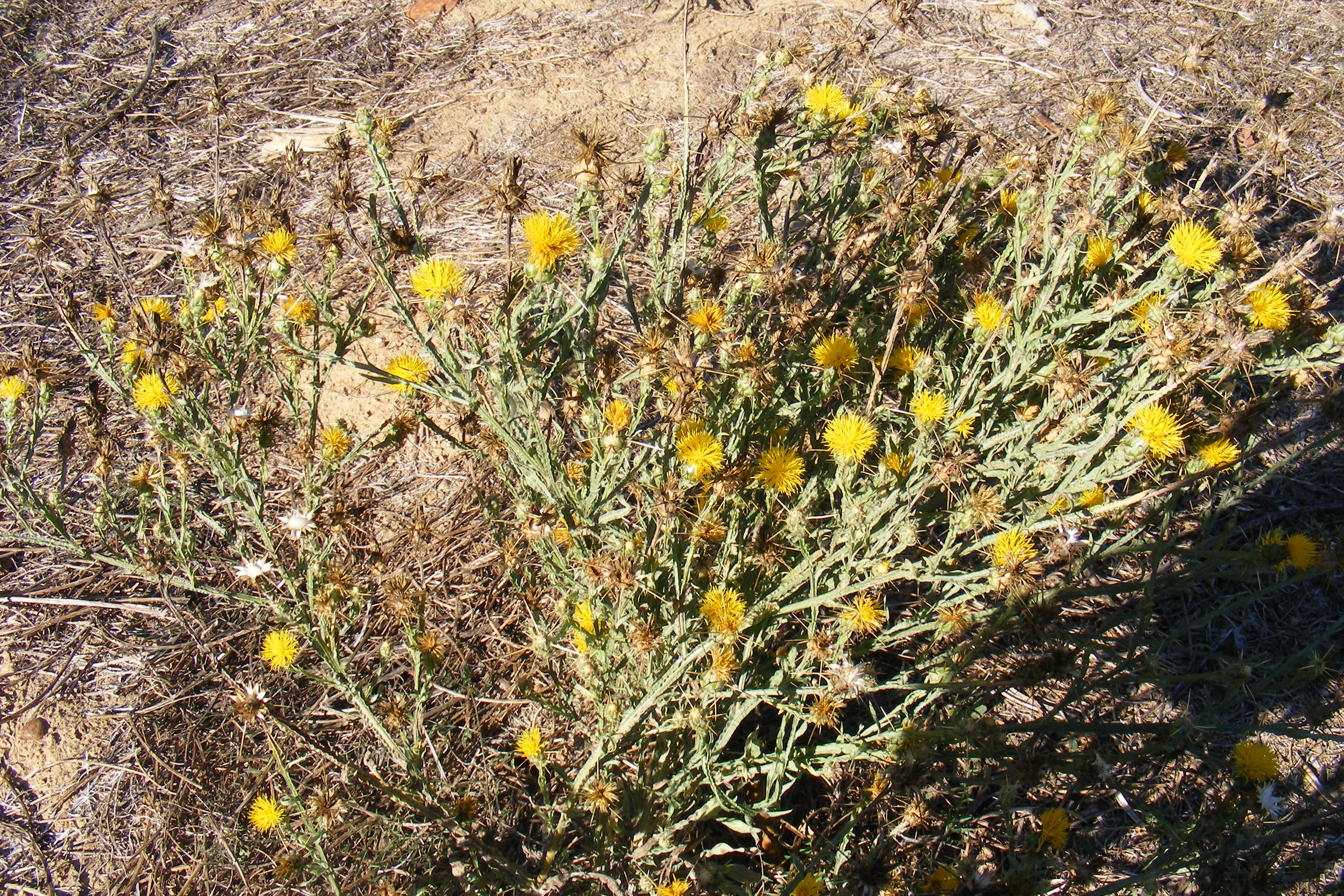
Specimen in California in autumn

Yellow star-thistle is sometimes resistant to removal methods such as mowing and burning, because of its long root system and the seeds' ability to withstand fire. The plant has been the target of biological pest control programs with positive results. Seven types of seed-feeding insects have been released (one accidentally) to control the plant.

===== Insects =====
Three species of weevil in the beetle subfamily Cleoninae effectively reduce seed production in the yellow star-thistle.

- Yellow star-thistle bud weevil (Bangasternus orientalis) is a fuzzy brown weevil that lays its eggs in the flowers, and when its larvae hatch, they feed on the developing seed.
- Yellow star-thistle hairy weevil (Eustenopus villosus) is a long-snouted, hairy-looking weevil that lays a single egg inside each flower bud. The larva then consumes the seeds within.
- Yellow star-thistle flower weevil (Larinus curtus) is a brownish weevil that lays eggs in the flowers as it feeds on the pollen. The larvae then eat the seeds when they hatch. This insect has failed to established dense populations in the United States.

Four species of tephritid fruit fly also attack the seedheads of yellow star-thistle.

- Yellow star-thistle peacock fly and false peacock fly (Chaetorellia australis and Chaetorellia succinea, respectively, the latter released unintentionally) are small nectar-feeding flies that deposit eggs into the seedheads, where their larvae consume the seeds and flower ovaries.
- Banded yellow star-thistle gall fly (Urophora sirunaseva) produces larvae that pupate within a woody gall within the flower and disrupt seed production.
- Another gall fly Urophora jaculata was released in 1969 but never established.

===== Fungi =====
A variety of the rust fungus Puccinia jaceae var. solstitialis, first released in July 2003 on a ranch in the Napa Valley, has shown promise as an agent against yellow star-thistle, dramatically damaging leaves and hampering growth. The rust causes widespread pathology in the leaves of the plant and slows its dispersal. The fungus Synchytrium solstitiale (Synchytrium of phylum Chytridiomycota) is also being considered as an agent of biological control.

===== Grazing =====
Grazing by goats, cattle, or sheep can be effective in controlling yellow star-thistle. Goats will eat star-thistle even in its spiny stage. Because yellow star-thistle growth is particularly difficult to inhibit in canyon rangelands since its remoteness limits control options, goats and other herbivores have become an excellent option to curb the plant's spread. According to one study, grazing has decreased yellow star-thistle presence by 58% when compared to the study's controls. Subplots also showed a 94% decrease in seed heads after only three years of experimentation.

===== Integrated methods =====
California researchers (Thomsen et al., 1996) tested mowing, controlled sheep grazing and subterranean clover plantings to control star-thistle growth. According to the researchers, subclover would help fill the void left by star-thistle populations.

They compared subclover seeding, grazing, two mowings, grazing + mowing without subclover – and an untouched control without grazing, subclover, or mowing. Thistle seed production was 130 times higher where only one mowing was done, and 1,720 times higher where nothing was done, as compared to the area that had been grazed and mowed twice. Excellent yellow star-thistle control can be achieved with the combination of competing plants, mowing, and rotational grazing.

===== Research =====
Although these biocontrol agents have proven somewhat effective at controlling Centaurea solstitialis, there is interest in finding additional agents to further control the species. Two weevils, including Larinus filiformis, a flowerhead feeding weevil, and Ceratapion basicorne (Illiger) (Coleoptera: Apionidae), which develops in the root crown of rosettes have been evaluated and proposed for introduction. Also under evaluation are a stem-feeding flea beetle Psylliodes chalcomera (Illiger) (Coleoptera: Chrysomelidae) (Cristofaro et al. 2004a), a lacebug Tingis grisea Germar (Heteroptera: Tingidae), and a mite Aceria solstitialis de Lillo (Acari: Eriophyidae).

== Toxicity ==
Grazing of the plant by horses can cause nigropallidal encephalomalacia or "chewing disease", a neurological condition. The disease generally follows consumption of 60–200% of the horse's body weight over an extended period of a month or more, or 2.3–2.6 kilograms (5.1–5.7 pounds) of star-thistle per 100 kg (220 lb) body weight per day. Though star-thistle is most dangerous when it is the only plant available or is delivered as a contaminant in dried hay, horses may develop a taste for it and seek it out. Many other grazing species, including mules and burros, are not affected.

== Uses ==
Although the spines make the plant a pain to deal with, it produces a light honey.

== See also ==
- Invasive species in the United States
- List of invasive species in North America
