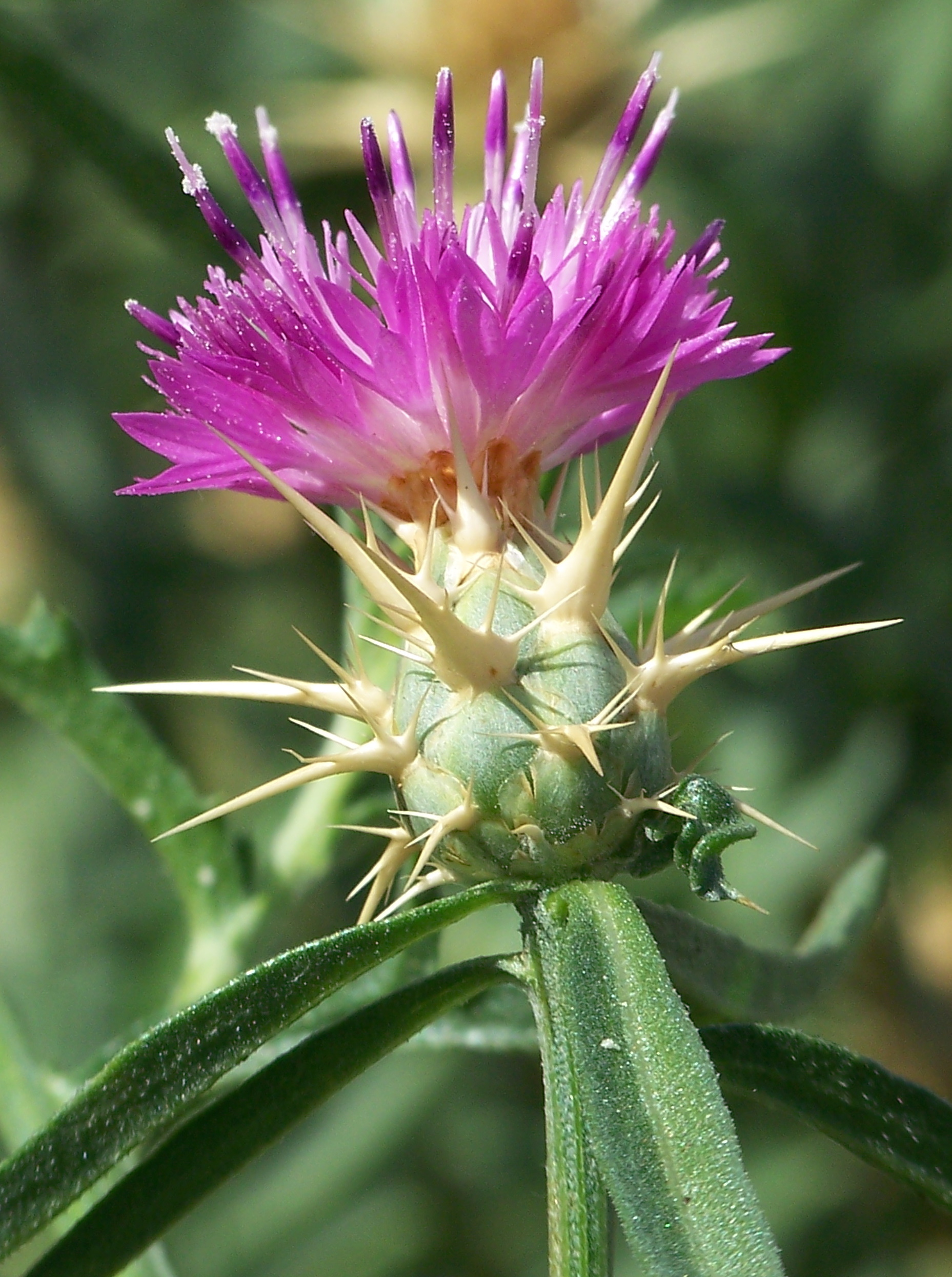
- Young plant

Scientific classification
- Kingdom: Plantae
- Clade: Tracheophytes
- Clade: Angiosperms
- Clade: Eudicots
- Clade: Asterids
- Order: Asterales
- Family: Asteraceae
- Genus: Centaurea
- Species: C. calcitrapa

Binomial name
- Centaurea calcitrapa L. (1753)

Subspecies
- Centaurea calcitrapa subsp. angusticeps (H.Lindb.) Meikle; Centaurea calcitrapa subsp. calcitrapa; Centaurea calcitrapa subsp. cilicica (Boiss. & Balansa) Wagenitz

Synonyms
- Calcitrapa calcitrapa (L.) Hill (1768), not validly publ.; Calcitrapa vulgaris Bernh. (1800); Rhaponticum calcitrapa (L.) Scop. (1771)

= Centaurea calcitrapa =

Species of flowering plant

Centaurea calcitrapa is a species of flowering plant known by several common names, including common star thistle, red star-thistle and purple star thistle. It is native to Europe but is known across the globe as an introduced species and often a noxious weed. The species name calcitrapa comes from the word caltrop, a type of weapon covered in sharp spikes.

== Description ==
This an annual or biennial plant growing erect to a maximum height of one to 1.3 metres.

The stems are hairless and grooved.

It sometimes takes the shape of a mound, and it is finely to densely hairy to spiny. The leaves are dotted with resin glands. The lowermost may reach a length of 20 centimeters and are deeply cut into lobes. The inflorescence contains a few flower heads. Each is 1.5 to 2 centimeters long and oval in general shape. The phyllaries are green or straw-colored and tipped in tough, sharp yellow spines. The head contains many bright purple flowers. The fruit is an achene a few millimeters long which lacks a pappus.

It flowers from July until September, and the seeds ripen from August to October.

The Red Star-thistle has been identified as a Priority Species by the UK Biodiversity Action Plan. It is identified as 'vulnerable' by the UNIC and is listed as Nationally Rare in the UK Red Data Book. There is no national or Sussex BAP for this species.

== Distribution ==
=== Native distribution ===
- Albania
- Algeria
- Austria
- Baltic states
- Bulgaria
- Cape Verde
- Cyprus
- Czech Republic
- Egypt

- Sinai Peninsula

- In France

- Corsica

- Greece

- Crete
- Dodecanese
- North Aegean islands

- Hungary
- Iran
- Italy

- Sardinia
- Sicily

- Lebanon
- Morocco
- Portugal

- Madeira

- Romania
- Saudi Arabia
- Slovakia
- Spain

- Balearic Islands
- Canary Islands

- Sudan
- Syria
- Tunisia
- Turkey

- East Thrace
- North Aegean islands

- Ukraine

- Crimea

- former Yugoslavia

=== Introduced distribution ===
- In Australia

- South Australia
- Tasmania
- Victoria

- Belgium
- In Canada

- Ontario

- France
- Germany
- Great Britain
- Western Himalaya
- Ireland
- Netherlands
- Norway
- Pakistan
- Poland
- In South Africa

- Cape Provinces
- Free State

- Switzerland
- Uruguay
- In the United States:

- Alabama
- Arizona
- California
- Washington, D.C.
- Florida
- Georgia
- Illinois
- India
- Iowa
- Maryland
- Massachusetts
- New Jersey
- New Mexico
- New York State
- Oregon
- Pennsylvania
- Utah
- Virginia
- Washington

== Subspecies ==
Three subspecies are accepted.

- Centaurea calcitrapa subsp. angusticeps (H.Lindb.) Meikle – Cyprus
- Centaurea calcitrapa subsp. calcitrapa – Baltic states, Czech Republic, southeastern Europe, Corsica, Sardinia, Iberian Peninsula, northwestern Africa, Egypt, Sudan, Turkey, Lebanon and Syria, Saudi Arabia, and Iran.
- Centaurea calcitrapa subsp. cilicica (Boiss. & Balansa) Wagenitz – Turkey

== Uses ==
In western Crete, Greece a local variety called gourounaki (γουρουνάκι - little pig) has its leaves eaten boiled by the locals. A south Italian variety of the species is also traditionally consumed by ethnic Albanians (Arbëreshë people) in the Vulture area (southern Italy). In the Arbëreshë communities in Lucania the young whorls of Centaurea calcitrapa are boiled and fried in mixtures with other weedy non cultivated greens.

== Control ==
=== Herbicides ===
Picloram + 2,4-D, low volatile ester 2,4-D, Dicamba, and Fluroxypyr + Aminopyralid are recommended for use in New South Wales, and aminocyclopyrachlor + chlorsulfuron, aminopyralid, chlorsulfuron, clopyralid, clopyralid + 2,4-D, dicamba, diflufenzopyr + dicamba, picloram, and triclopyr + clopyralid for the Pacific Northwest of North America.

==== Herbicide resistance ====
Picloram + 2,4-D, low volatile ester 2,4-D, Dicamba, and Fluroxypyr + Aminopyralid all carry a "moderate" risk of producing resistance in C. calcitrapa.

== Similar species ==
- Centaurea aspera, known as rough star-thistle. The main difference is the bract appendages are palmately arranged.
- Centaurea solstitialis, known as yellow star thistle. Differs in having yellow flowers palmately arranged, spiny bract appendages, with middle spine only 1 to 2 cm.
