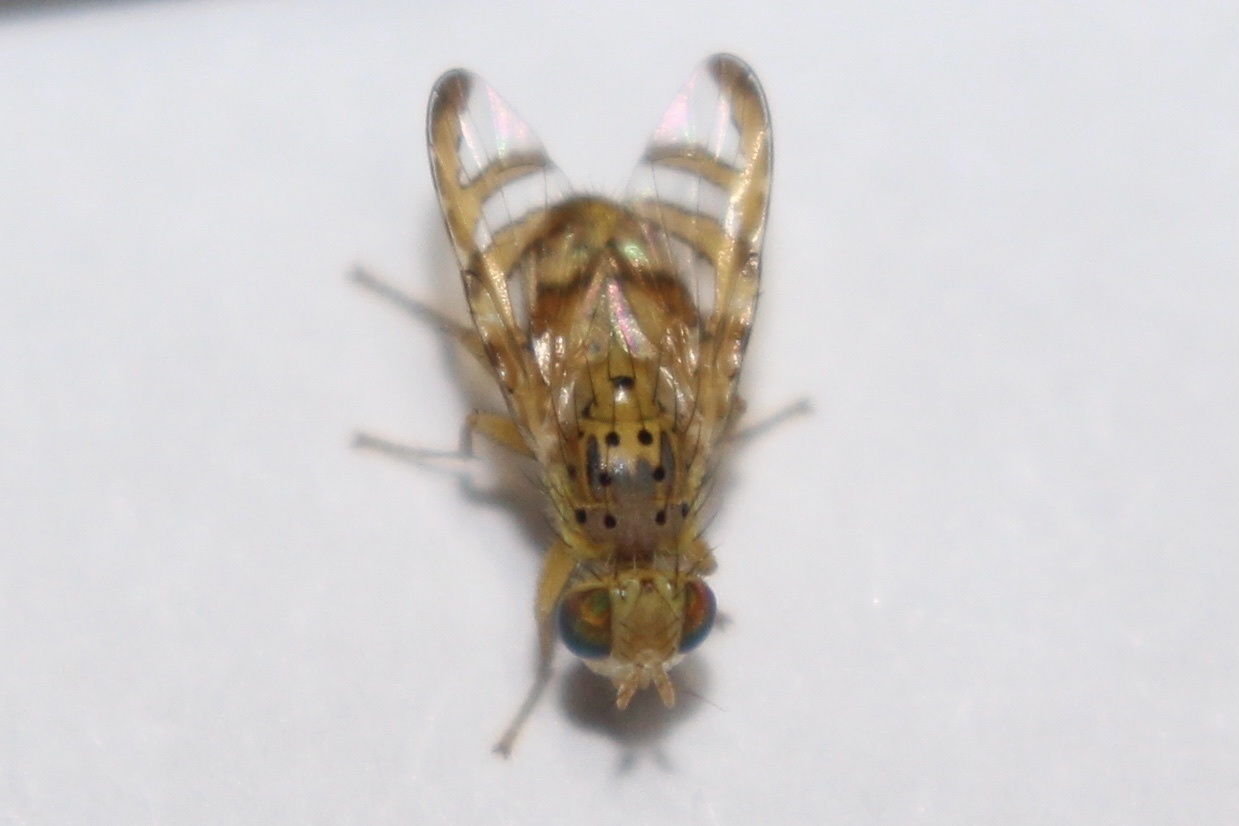

Scientific classification
- Kingdom: Animalia
- Phylum: Arthropoda
- Clade: Pancrustacea
- Class: Insecta
- Order: Diptera
- Family: Tephritidae
- Subfamily: Tephritinae
- Tribe: Terelliini
- Genus: Chaetorellia
- Species: C. succinea

Binomial name
- Chaetorellia succinea (Costa, 1844)

Synonyms
- Trypeta succinea Costa, 1844; Trypeta mellea Costa, 1844

= Chaetorellia succinea =

Species of fly

Chaetorellia succinea is a species of tephritid fruit fly that was accidentally released in 1991 into the United States and had since become one of the major biological pest controls against the noxious weed yellow starthistle (Centaurea solstitialis).

It was not released intentionally for fears that it could become a pest of safflower, Carthamus tinctorius L. It was probably introduced from a shipment of yellow starthistle heads from Greece.

C. succinea has also been found to feed on two other introduced Centaurea species (Maltese starthistle, Centaurea melitensis L.; Sicilian starthistle, Centaurea sulphurea Willd.) and the Native American starthistle (Centaurea americana) Nutt.

C. succinea probably displaces another biocontrol fly, Chaetorellia australis, where the two co-occur.

== Distribution ==
Italy, Greece, Turkey, Caucasus & Kazakhstan, South to Egypt, Jordan & Iran. Introduced to Oregon & California.
