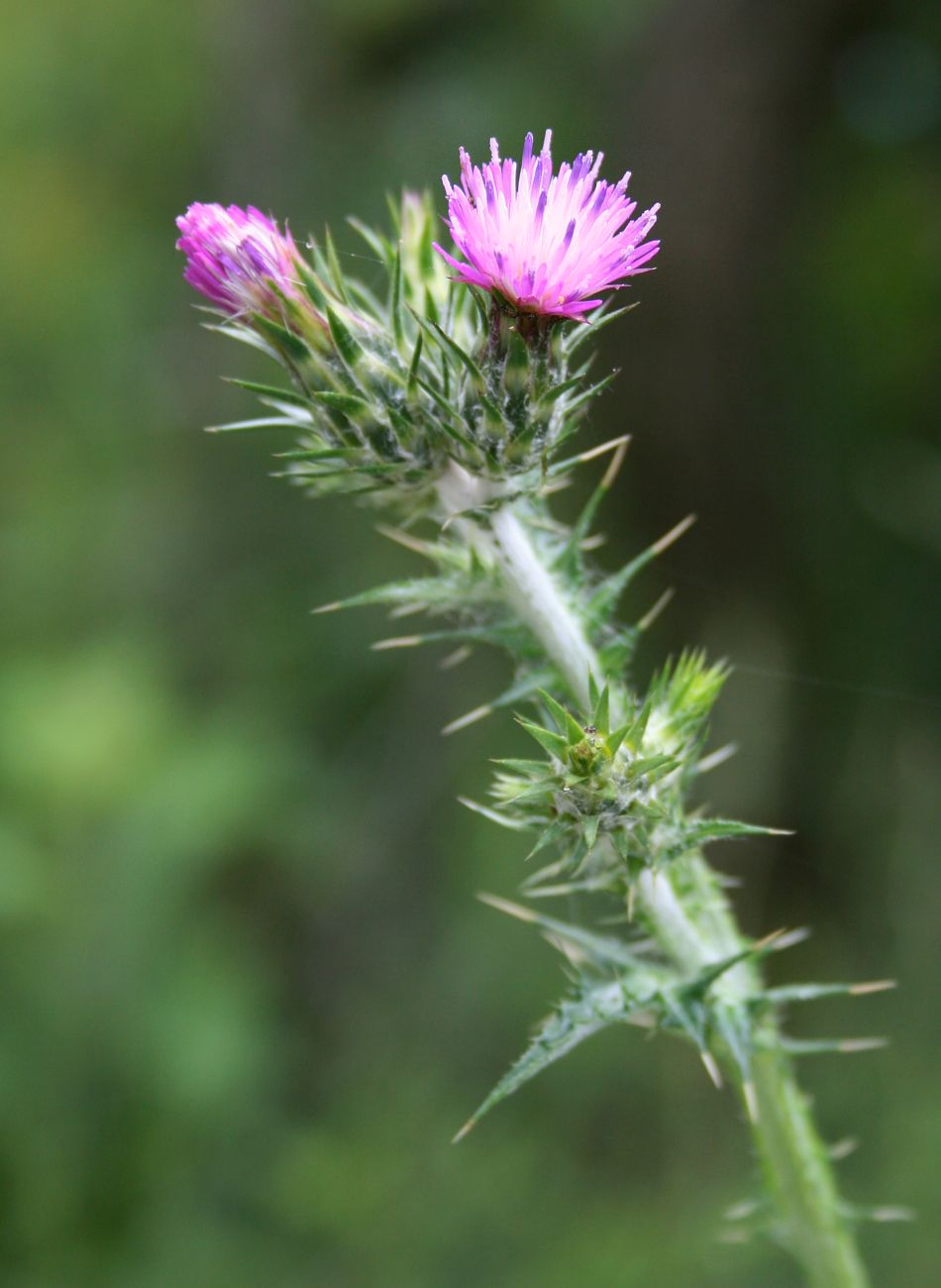
- Carduus pycnocephalus flowers (Italy)

Scientific classification
- Kingdom: Plantae
- Clade: Embryophytes
- Clade: Tracheophytes
- Clade: Spermatophytes
- Clade: Angiosperms
- Clade: Eudicots
- Clade: Asterids
- Order: Asterales
- Family: Asteraceae
- Genus: Carduus
- Species: C. pycnocephalus

Binomial name
- Carduus pycnocephalus L.

= Carduus pycnocephalus =

Species of flowering plant in the daisy family

Carduus pycnocephalus, with common names including Italian thistle, Italian plumeless thistle, and Plymouth thistle, is a species of thistle. It is native to the Mediterranean region in southern Europe, North Africa, and Western Asia; Eastern Europe and the Caucasus; and the Indian subcontinent.

The plant has become an introduced species in other regions, and on other continents, often becoming a noxious weed or invasive species.

== Description ==
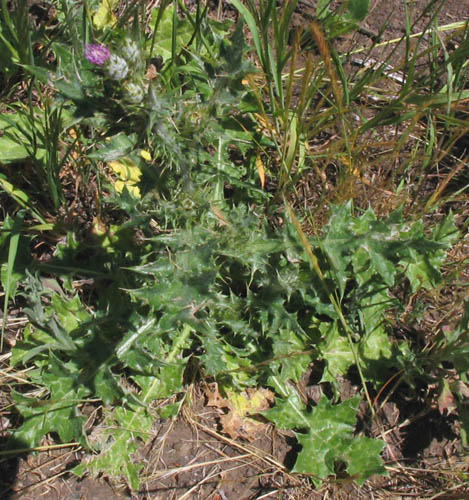
Carduus pycnocephalus plant (California)

A winter annual, Carduus pycnocephalus has stems ranging from 8 inches (20 cm) to 6.6 feet (2.0 m), glabrous to slightly wooly. The multiple stems are winged with spines.

The plant grows in a rosettes of 10–14 inches (25–36 cm) in diameter, with four to ten lobed basal leaves that are 4–6 inches (10–15 cm) long. Cauline leaves are tomentose on the underside and contain spines on the lobe tips.

Flower heads are 2–5 per cluster, densely matted with cobwebby hairs at the base of the phyllaries and spiny towards the tips. Corollas are pink to purple, approx. 1.0–1.4 cm (0.4–0.6 in) long, and the fruits are brown to gold, with a bristly, minutely barbed pappus.

== Noxious weed ==
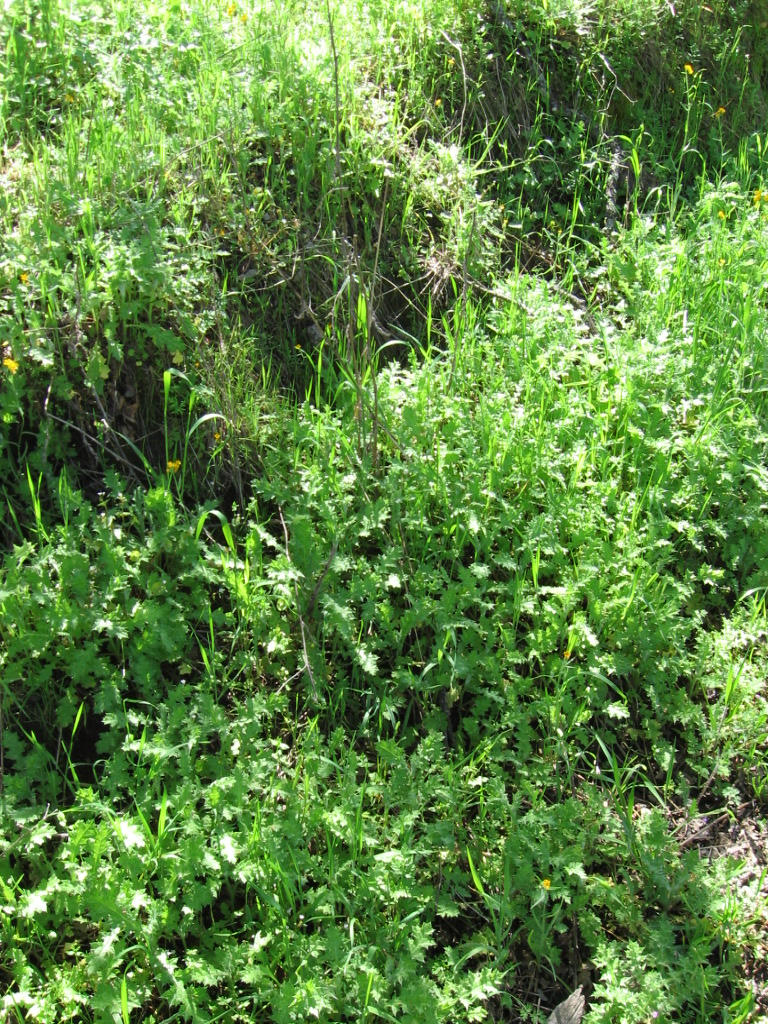
Dense crowding by Italian thistle rosettes

Carduus pycnocephalus has become a noxious weed in Australia, New Zealand, Macaronesia, South Africa, the Arabian Peninsula, South America, Hawaii, and North America, especially in much of California. It is a C-listed weed by the California Department of Agriculture and a Moderate Invasive Plant rating by the California Invasive Plant Council. It favors grasslands, woodlands, and chaparral vegetation types, but is especially prevalent in oak woodlands in and around the Central Valley. It is found in disturbed areas, often with basaltic soils, fertile soils, or soils with a relatively high pH (> 6.5).

=== Impacts ===
Italian thistle can grow densely, crowding out other vegetation with dense rosette 'colonies' in the winter, thereby preventing establishment of native plants. Its spiny leaves, stems, and phyllaries prevent animals from grazing on it and nearby forage. Its tendency to grow under the canopy of oaks increases the risk of wildfire damage to the trees, as fire can more easily spread to the canopy.

=== Control ===
Mechanical

Mechanical methods can be effective but must be done before the plant sets seed. Additionally, the root must be severed at least 4 inches (10 cm) below the ground to prevent the plant from regenerating. Mowing and slashing are not reliable as the plant is able to regrow and produce seed even at a height of 3 inches (7.6 cm).

Biological

Biological control agents have limited success with Carduus pycnocephalus. Insects that tested host-specific by the California Department of Agriculture and caused significant damage to the reproductive structures of the Italian thistle have not been utilized, due to concerns about possible predation of California's native thistle species. Puccinia cardui-pycnocephali is a species of rust (fungus) apparently exclusive to Carduus pycnocephalus. Other rust species have been found on Italian thistle as well.

Grazing by sheep or goats (not cattle) in Australia has shown promise as well.

Chemical

Chemical control can be achieved with a variety of products, including clopyralid, glyphosate, Diquat, Picloram, and 2, 4-D ester. However, caution must be exercised when using these products, and their use is not always appropriate, especially near water surfaces and other sensitive natural habitats.
