= C. australis =

C. australis may refer to:

- Ceuthmochares aereus, the Yellowbill, a bird species found in Africa
- Chaetorellia australis, the yellow starthistle peacock fly, a fly species native to southern Europe and the Mediterranean
- Charadrius australis, the Inland Dotterel or Australian Dotterel, a medium-sized plover species found in Australia
- Cirrhigaleus australis, the Southern Mandarin dogfish, a shark species
- Citrus australis, the round lime or Australian lime, a large shrub or small tree found in Australia
- Cordyline australis, the cabbage tree, a monocotyledon plant species endemic to New Zealand
- Ctenomys australis, the Southern tuco-tuco, a rodent species endemic to Argentina.
- Cyathea australis, the rough tree fern, a tree fern species native to Australia
- Cyclaspis australis, a crustacean species in the genus Cyclaspis
- Cyclorana australis, the giant frog, a burrowing frog found in Australia

== See also ==
- Australis (disambiguation)
