= Chilean clover =

Chilean clover is a common name for several plants and may refer to:

- Medicago sativa
- Trifolium chilense
- Trifolium macraei
