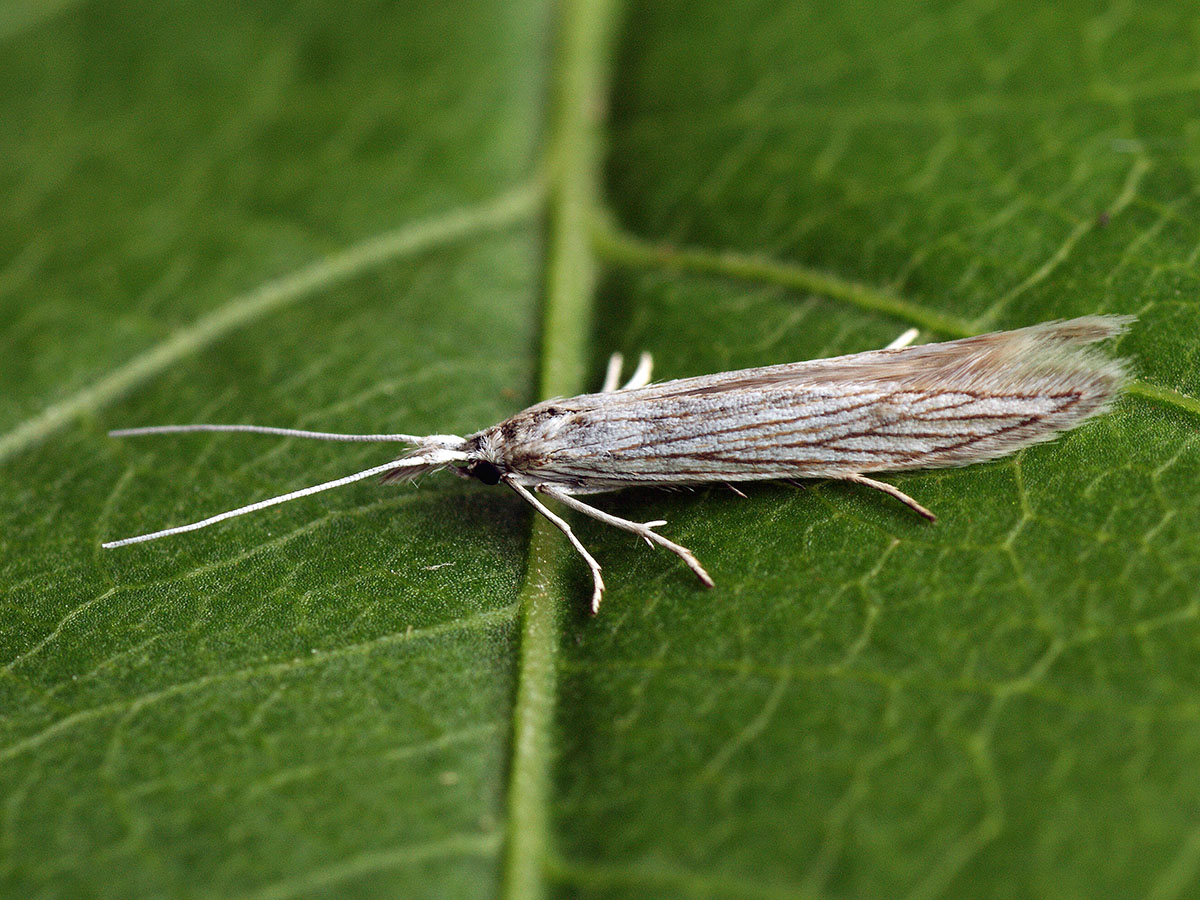

Scientific classification
- Kingdom: Animalia
- Phylum: Arthropoda
- Clade: Pancrustacea
- Class: Insecta
- Order: Lepidoptera
- Family: Coleophoridae
- Genus: Coleophora
- Species: C. brevipalpella

Binomial name
- Coleophora brevipalpella Wocke, 1874

= Coleophora brevipalpella =

Species of moth

Coleophora brevipalpella is a moth of the family Coleophoridae. It is found from Fennoscandia to the Pyrenees, the Alps and the Carpathian Mountains and from Germany to Romania and North Macedonia.

The wingspan is 17–19 millimetres (0.67–0.75 in).

The larvae feed on Centaurea aspera, Centaurea jacea, Centaurea scabiosa and Serratula tinctoria. They create a spathulate leaf case of up to 15 millimetres (0.59 in) long. Full-grown larvae can be found in June.
