= Chaetorellia carthami =

Scientific classification
- Kingdom: Animalia
- Phylum: Arthropoda
- Clade: Pancrustacea
- Class: Insecta
- Order: Diptera
- Family: Tephritidae
- Subfamily: Tephritinae
- Tribe: Terelliini
- Genus: Chaetorellia
- Species: C. carthami

Binomial name
- Chaetorellia carthami Stackelberg, 1929

Species of fly

Chaetorellia carthami is a species of tephritid or fruit flies in the genus Chaetorellia of the family Tephritidae.

== Distribution ==
Europe, East to Central Asia, S to Israel & Iraq.
