= Chaetorellia acrolophi =

Scientific classification
- Kingdom: Animalia
- Phylum: Arthropoda
- Clade: Pancrustacea
- Class: Insecta
- Order: Diptera
- Family: Tephritidae
- Subfamily: Tephritinae
- Tribe: Terelliini
- Genus: Chaetorellia
- Species: C. acrolophi

Binomial name
- Chaetorellia acrolophi White & Marquardt, 1989

Species of fly

Chaetorellia acrolophi is a species of tephritid fruit fly known as the knapweed peacock fly. It is used as an agent of biological pest control against noxious knapweeds, especially spotted knapweed (Centaurea maculosa).

The adult fly is light greenish brown with brown-banded wings and iridescent green eyes. It is 3 to 5 millimeters long.external image The female lays about 70 eggs beneath the bracts on immature flower heads. When the larva emerges from the egg a few days later it burrows into the flower head and feeds on the developing florets. As the larva grows it begins to feed on the developing seeds, often consuming the entire contents of the flower head during its two-week larval stage. It pupates inside the empty flower head.

This fly is native to Europe. It was first released as a knapweed biocontrol in the 1990s in Montana, and it is currently established in much of the western United States. It is host-specific to invasive knapweeds, preferring spotted knapweed, and has not been known to attack any native plants. The fly is often outcompeted by other species that attack knapweed flower heads, such as certain weevils, so it does best where there are no competitors.

== Distribution ==
France, Spain, East to Belarus, Turkey. Introduced to North America.
