= Chaetorellia loricata =

Scientific classification
- Kingdom: Animalia
- Phylum: Arthropoda
- Clade: Pancrustacea
- Class: Insecta
- Order: Diptera
- Family: Tephritidae
- Subfamily: Tephritinae
- Tribe: Terelliini
- Genus: Chaetorellia
- Species: C. loricata

Binomial name
- Chaetorellia loricata (Rondani, 1870)

Synonyms
- Chaetorellia caradjai Hering, 1937; Chaetorellia holosericea Hendel, 1927; Chaetorellia loricata ssp. septentrionalis Hering, 1937; Chaetorellia mara Hering, 1937; Tripeta loricata Rondani, 1870

Species of fly

Chaetorellia loricata is a species of tephritid or fruit flies in the genus Chaetorellia of the family Tephritidae.

== Distribution ==
Britain, Germany, Ukraine & Kazakhstan, South to Spain, Italy & Turkey.
