= Chaetorellia isais =

Scientific classification
- Kingdom: Animalia
- Phylum: Arthropoda
- Clade: Pancrustacea
- Class: Insecta
- Order: Diptera
- Family: Tephritidae
- Subfamily: Tephritinae
- Tribe: Terelliini
- Genus: Chaetorellia
- Species: C. isais

Binomial name
- Chaetorellia isais Hering, 1937

Species of fly

Chaetorellia isais is a species of tephritid or fruit flies in the genus Chaetorellia of the family Tephritidae.

== Distribution ==
Lebanon & Russia, Kazakhstan, China.
