= Chaetorellia ampliata =

Scientific classification
- Kingdom: Animalia
- Phylum: Arthropoda
- Clade: Pancrustacea
- Class: Insecta
- Order: Diptera
- Family: Tephritidae
- Subfamily: Tephritinae
- Tribe: Terelliini
- Genus: Chaetorellia
- Species: C. ampliata

Binomial name
- Chaetorellia ampliata Wang, 1990

Species of fly

Chaetorellia ampliata is a species of tephritid or fruit flies in the genus Chaetorellia of the family Tephritidae.

== Distribution ==
China.
