= Aminopyralid =

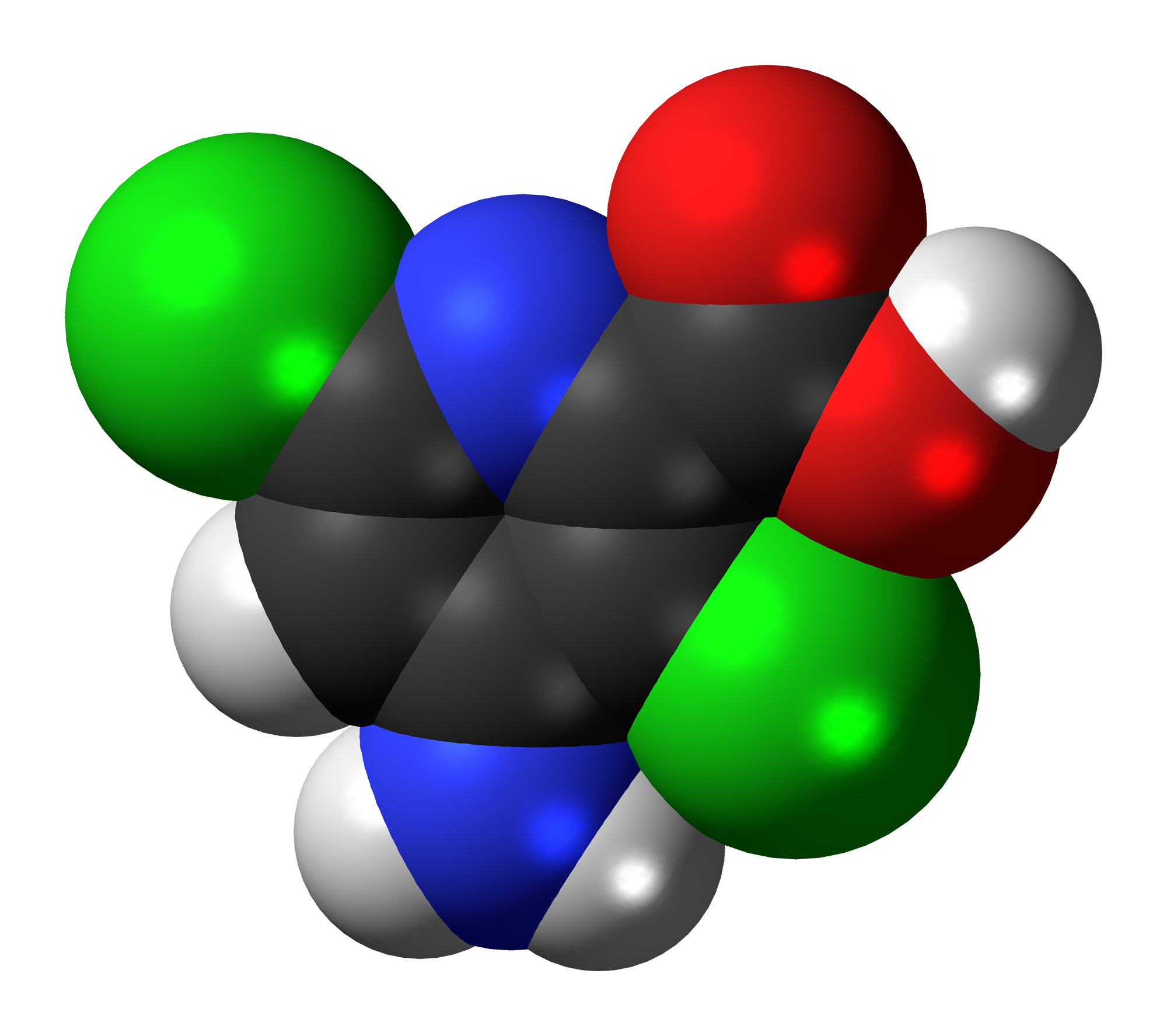

Names
- Preferred IUPAC name 4-Amino-3,6-dichloropyridine-2-carboxylic acid
- Other names 4-Amino-3,6-dichloropicolinic acid

Identifiers
CAS Number	150114-71-9
3D model (JSmol)	Interactive image
ChemSpider	184712
ECHA InfoCard	100.110.366
PubChem CID	213012
UNII	9S4EMJ60LF
CompTox Dashboard (EPA)	DTXSID2034330
- InChI: InChI=1S/C6H4Cl2N2O2/c7-3-1-2(9)4(8)5(10-3)6(11)12/h1H,(H2,9,10)(H,11,12) Key: NIXXQNOQHKNPEJ-UHFFFAOYSA-N; InChI=1/C6H4Cl2N2O2/c7-3-1-2(9)4(8)5(10-3)6(11)12/h1H,(H2,9,10)(H,11,12) Key: NIXXQNOQHKNPEJ-UHFFFAOYAN
- SMILES: Clc1c(nc(Cl)cc1N)C(=O)O

Properties
Chemical formula	C_{6}H_{4}Cl_{2}N_{2}O_{2}
Molar mass	207.01416 g/mole
Appearance	Off-white powder
Density	1.72 (20°C, relative to water at 4°C)
Melting point	161.75 to 165.23 °C (323.15 to 329.41 °F; 434.90 to 438.38 K)
- Except where otherwise noted, data are given for materials in their standard state (at 25 °C [77 °F], 100 kPa). verify (what is ?) Infobox references

Aminopyralid is a selective herbicide used for control of broadleaf weeds, especially thistles and clovers. It is in the picolinic acid family of herbicides, which also includes clopyralid, picloram, triclopyr, and several less common herbicides. It was first registered for use in 2005, in the USA under the brand name "Milestone" and later under various names starting with "Grazon". In the UK it is sold under the brand names Banish, Forefront, Halcyon, Pharaoh, Pro-Banish, Runway, Synero, and Upfront.

Aminopyralid is of concern to vegetable growers, as it can enter the food chain via manure, which contains long-lasting residues of the herbicide. It affects potatoes, tomatoes, and beans, causing deformed plants, and poor or non-existent yields. Problems with manure contaminated with aminopyralid residue surfaced in the UK in June and July 2008, and, at the end of July 2008, Dow AgroSciences implemented an immediate suspension of UK sales and use of herbicides containing aminopyralid.

Tomato plant affected by aminopyralid herbicide residue from contaminated manure, grown July 2008, Cheshire, UK. Note tightly curled leaves, which is a symptom of aminopyralid contamination.

Approval of aminopyralid was subsequently reinstated in the UK on October 6, 2009, as reported by the UK regulatory authority, the Advisory Committee on Pesticides. The re-introduction was approved "with new recommendations and a stringent stewardship programme devised to prevent inadvertent movement of manure from farms".

Despite restrictions, symptoms of aminopyralid damage were recorded on crops growing in allotments in Edinburgh, UK as recently as June 2010; enquiries traced the source of contamination to a farm supplying hay to the stables from where bags of manure had been obtained. Symptoms of aminopyralid injury to vegetable crops were reported by small farmers and gardeners in Britain in July 2011.
