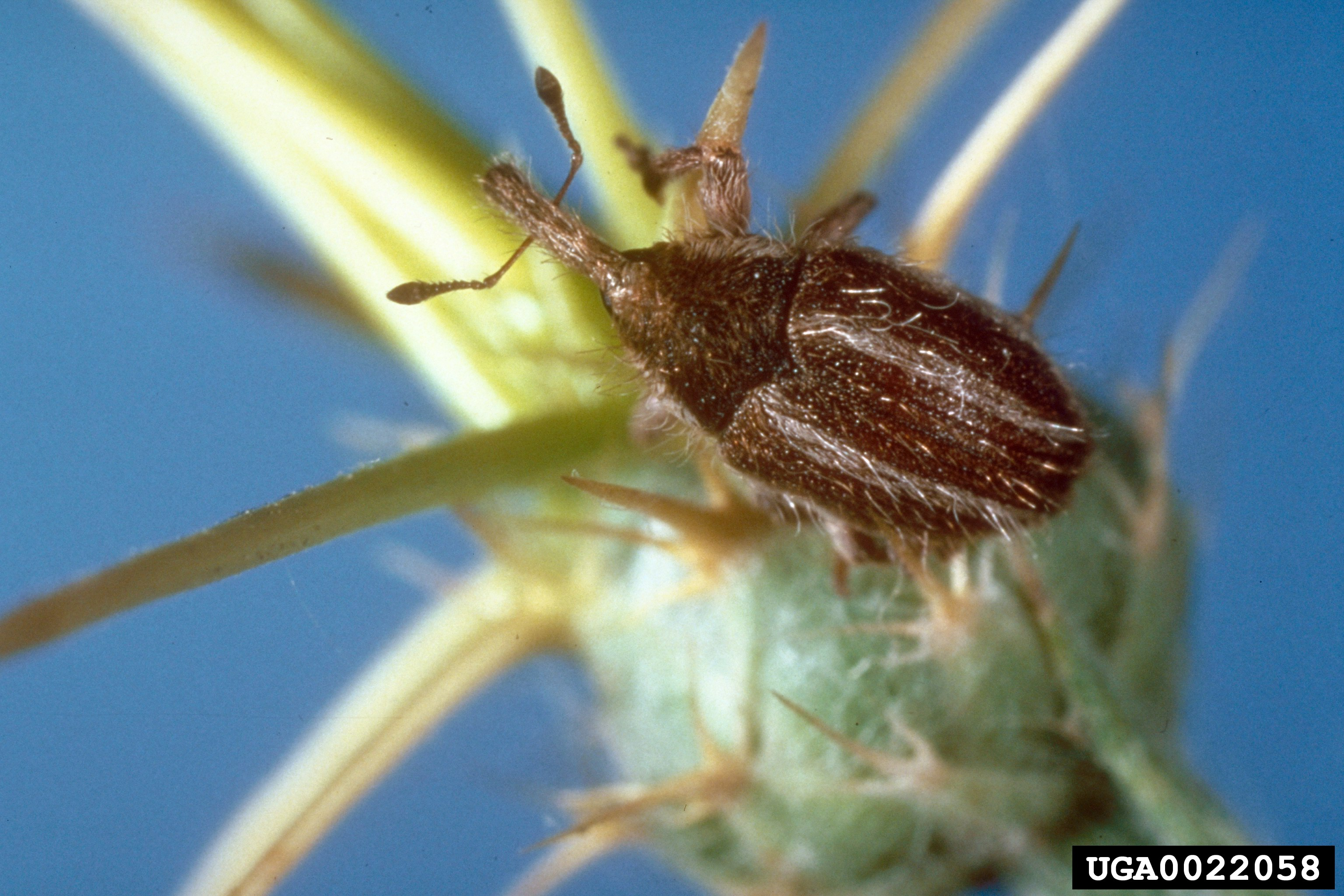

Scientific classification
- Kingdom: Animalia
- Phylum: Arthropoda
- Clade: Pancrustacea
- Class: Insecta
- Order: Coleoptera
- Suborder: Polyphaga
- Infraorder: Cucujiformia
- Superfamily: Curculionoidea
- Family: Curculionidae
- Genus: Eustenopus
- Species: E. villosus

Binomial name
- Eustenopus villosus (Boheman, 1843)

= Eustenopus villosus =

Species of beetle

Eustenopus villosus is a species of true weevil known as the yellow starthistle hairy weevil. It is used as an agent of biological pest control against the noxious weed yellow starthistle (Centaurea solstitialis).

The adult weevil is hairy and brown with white stripes. It is 4 to 6 millimeters long, not including its long snout. The female chews a hole in a closed flower head, deposits an egg inside, and seals the hole with a dark-colored mucilage. This visible hole can change the shape of the flower head as it grows. The larva emerges from its egg in about three days and begins to feed on the flower parts and developing seeds. In just over two weeks the larva can destroy all or nearly all of the developing seeds. It uses the scraps to build a chamber in which it pupates for one to two weeks and then leaves the flower head as an adult. Both larvae and adults of this species contribute to the damage done to the plant. The larvae eat the seeds in mature flower buds and the adults feed on smaller buds, destroying many. This weevil will readily attack many invasive Centaurea species, but has not been known to damage native flora.

This weevil is native to southern Europe and the Mediterranean. It was first released as a biocontrol agent in the United States in 1990 and it is now established in much of the western United States wherever yellow starthistle grows. It is considered one of the more efficient yellow starthistle biocontrol agents.
