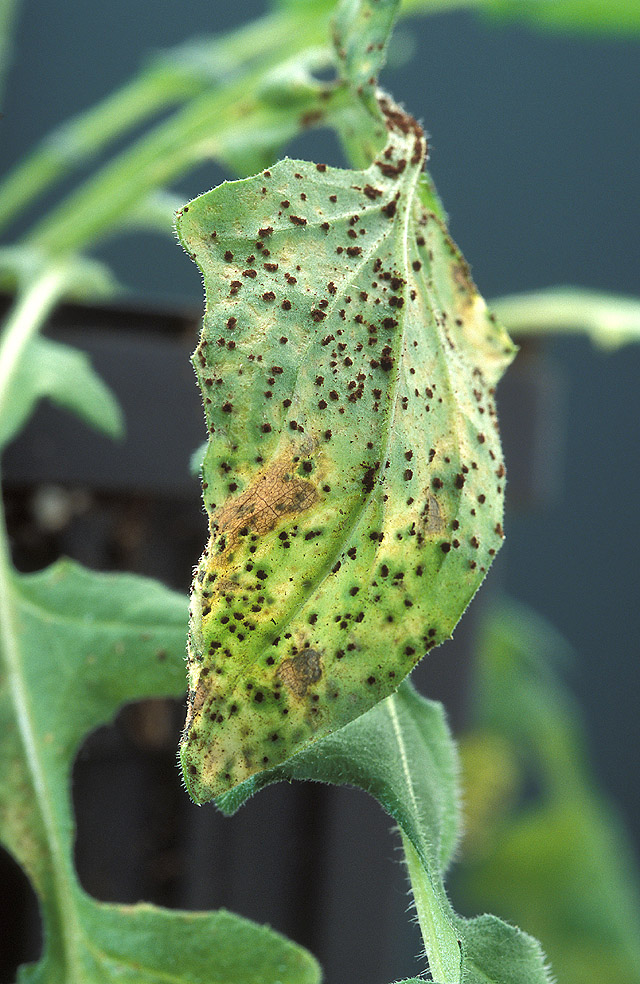
- Puccinia jaceae var. solstitialis causing rust on yellow starthistle leaves

Scientific classification
- Domain: Eukaryota
- Kingdom: Fungi
- Division: Basidiomycota
- Class: Pucciniomycetes
- Order: Pucciniales
- Family: Pucciniaceae
- Genus: Puccinia
- Species: P. jaceae
- Variety: P. j. var. solstitialis

Trinomial name
- Puccinia jaceae var. solstitialis Savile (1970)

= Puccinia jaceae var. solstitialis =

Species of fungus

Puccinia jaceae var. solstitialis is a species of fungus in the Pucciniaceae family. It is a plant pathogen that causes rust. Native to Eurasia, it is the first fungal pathogen approved in the United States as a biological control agent to curb the growth of the invasive weed yellow starthistle (Centaurea solstitialis).

== History ==
The rust species Puccinia jaceae was originally described by German botanist Gustav Heinrich Otth in 1866. In 1953, Hylander and colleagues synonymized P. jaceae with the P. hieracii, a species complex of rusts that attacked various Cichorieae plants. Later research determined that P. jaceae differed from the species P. hieracii, and Puccinia jaceae var. solstitialis was recognized as a variant of P. jaceae in a 1970 publication.

== Description ==
The fruiting bodies, the pycnia, are flask-shaped and amphigenous (bearing hymenium all over the surface of the spore-producing body). This species also has amphigenous uredinia, groups of binucleate cells that produce urediniospores; the urediniospores are flattened to ellipsoidal in shape, typically 24–33 μm long by 19–25.5 μm thick by 22–30 μm wide. The spore wall is 1.5–2.4 μm thick on the rim (as viewed when the spores lie flat), 2.4–3.5 μm at base, and 2.2–3.5 μm on flattened face. The spore color is yellow-brown to light chestnut, with the base generally the same color. The hilum (the area where the spore attaches to the sterigma) is smooth; the spore echinulations 0.7–1.0 μm diam by 1.5–4.0 μm spacing, occasionally evenly over whole spore, but in general very fine or rarely lacking in a circle 7–10 μm diam below each germ pore. There are two germ pores on each spore, situated equatorially, without bumps (papilla). The telia (fruiting structures that produce teliospores) resemble uredinia. The teliospores are 27–46 by 20–30 μm, and not constricted at the septum. The teliospore walls are 1.5–2.5 μm away from germ pores, yellow-brown to light chestnut in color, with warts 0.2–0.5 μm high by 0.7–1.3 μm diam over pores but generally fainter or nonexistent elsewhere.

== Biological control agent ==
This fungus is being used as a biological control organism to help reduce the spread of the invasive weed yellow starthistle (Centaurea solstitialis). This plant infests large areas of pasture and rangeland in the United States and Canada, and is of considerable economic importance because of its detrimental effects on the growth of desirable species.

Puccinia jaceae var. solstitialis is the first pathogen approved by the United States Department of Agriculture as a classical biological control agent. The first outdoor release of the fungus was made in Napa County, California in July 2003, using an isolate originally collected in 1984, east of Yarhisar and Hafik (SIVAS), Turkey. It has since been released at 77 sites in 37 counties. From 2004 to 2006, 183 releases were made in California in 41 counties, and a five further releases were made in 2007.

== Distribution ==
Although native to Eurasia, this fungus can also be found in France.

== See also ==
- Plant disease
- Fungus
