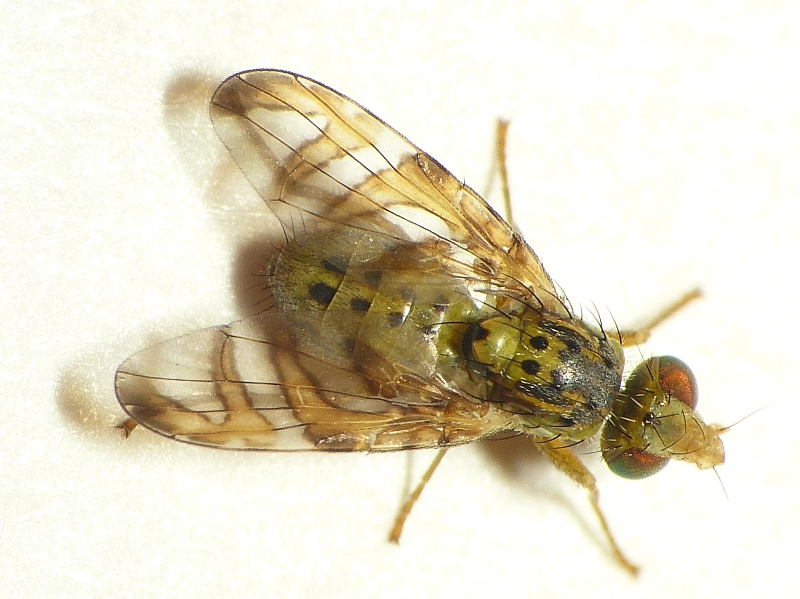
- Chaetorellia jaceae

Scientific classification
- Kingdom: Animalia
- Phylum: Arthropoda
- Clade: Pancrustacea
- Class: Insecta
- Order: Diptera
- Family: Tephritidae
- Subfamily: Tephritinae
- Tribe: Terelliini
- Genus: Chaetorellia; Hendel, 1927

Type species
- Tephrytis jaceae Robineau-Desvoidy, 1830

= Chaetorellia =

Genus of flies

Chaetorellia is a genus of tephritid or fruit flies in the family Tephritidae.

== Species ==
- Chaetorellia acrolophi White & Marquardt, 1989
- Chaetorellia ampliata Wang, 1990
- Chaetorellia australis Hering, 1940
- Chaetorellia carthami Stackelberg, 1929
- Chaetorellia conjuncta (Becker, 1913)
- Chaetorellia hestia Hering, 1937
- Chaetorellia isais Hering, 1937
- Chaetorellia jaceae (Robineau-Desvoidy, 1830)
- Chaetorellia loricata (Rondani, 1870)
- Chaetorellia succinea (Costa, 1844)
