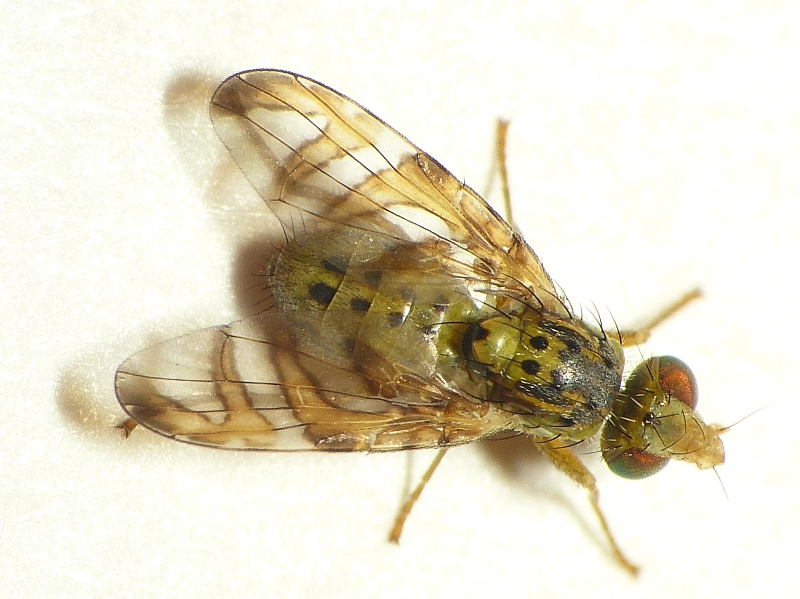

Scientific classification
- Kingdom: Animalia
- Phylum: Arthropoda
- Clade: Pancrustacea
- Class: Insecta
- Order: Diptera
- Family: Tephritidae
- Subfamily: Tephritinae
- Tribe: Terelliini
- Genus: Chaetorellia
- Species: C. jaceae

Binomial name
- Chaetorellia jaceae Robineau-Desvoidy, 1830

Synonyms
- Tephrytis dorsalis Robineau-Desvoidy, 1830; Tephrytis jaceae Robineau-Desvoidy, 1830; Tephrytis pusilla Robineau-Desvoidy, 1830

= Chaetorellia jaceae =

Species of fly

Chaetorellia jaceae is a species of tephritid or fruit flies in the genus Chaetorellia of the family Tephritidae.

== Distribution ==
Europe, South to France, Italy, Hungary, Ukraine & Caucasus.
