= Chaetorellia conjuncta =

Scientific classification
- Kingdom: Animalia
- Phylum: Arthropoda
- Clade: Pancrustacea
- Class: Insecta
- Order: Diptera
- Family: Tephritidae
- Subfamily: Tephritinae
- Tribe: Terelliini
- Genus: Chaetorellia
- Species: C. conjuncta

Binomial name
- Chaetorellia conjuncta (Becker, 1913)

Synonyms
- Terellia conjuncta Becker, 1913

Species of fly

Chaetorellia conjuncta is a species of tephritid or fruit flies in the genus Chaetorellia of the family Tephritidae.

== Distribution ==
Albania & Kazakhstan South to Egypt & Pakistan.
