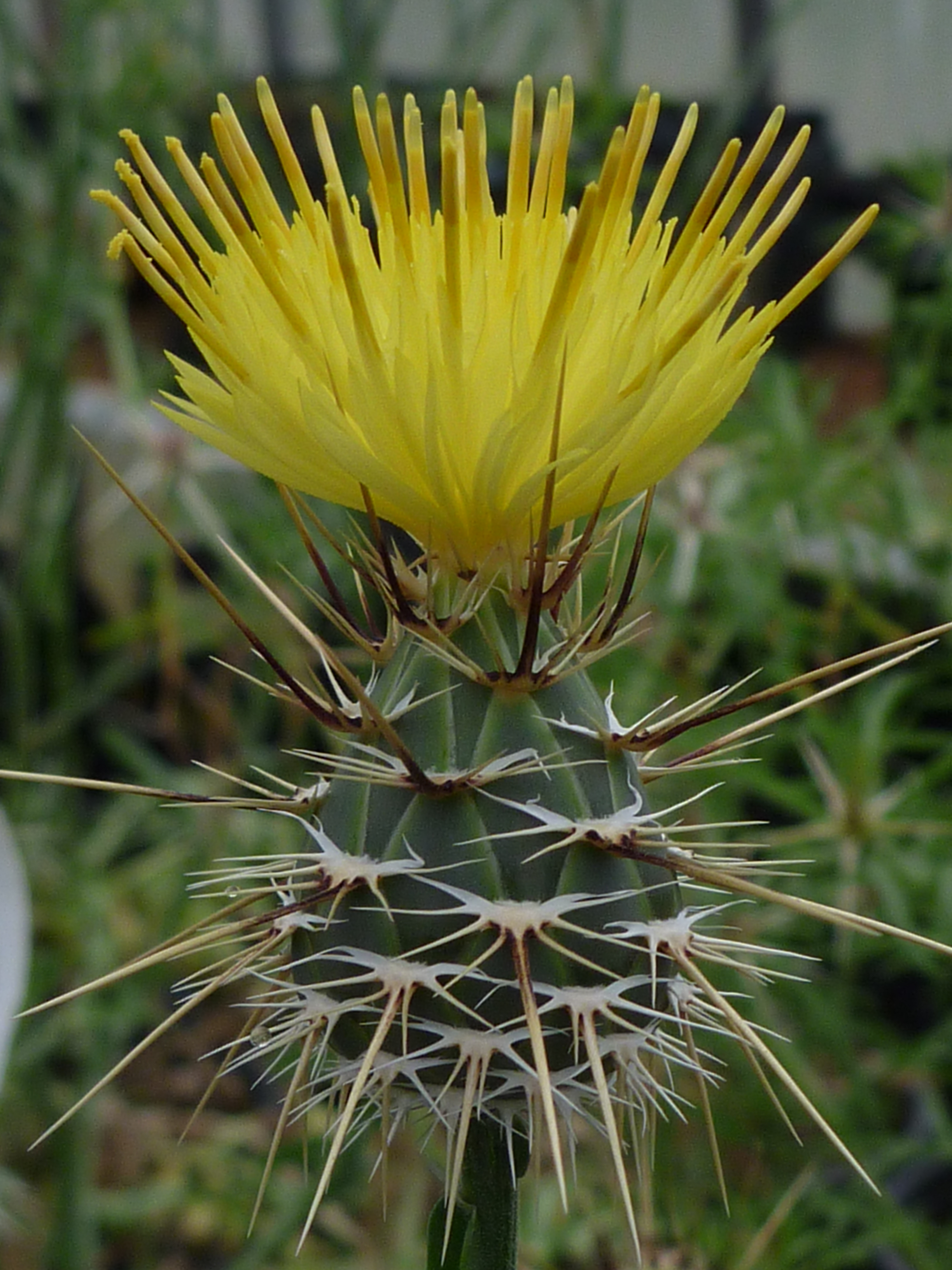

Scientific classification
- Kingdom: Plantae
- Clade: Tracheophytes
- Clade: Angiosperms
- Clade: Eudicots
- Clade: Asterids
- Order: Asterales
- Family: Asteraceae
- Genus: Centaurea
- Species: C. sulphurea

Binomial name
- Centaurea sulphurea Willd.

= Centaurea sulphurea =

Species of flowering plant

Centaurea sulphurea, the Sicilian star thistle or sulphur star knapweed, is an annual herb species in the family Asteraceae. It is native to southwestern Europe and it is known on other continents as an introduced species. It is one of the closest relatives to Centaurea solstitialis, an extremely invasive thistle in California, but Centaurea sulphurea has only established several populations in California since its introduction in the mid-19th century.
