= Clopyralid =

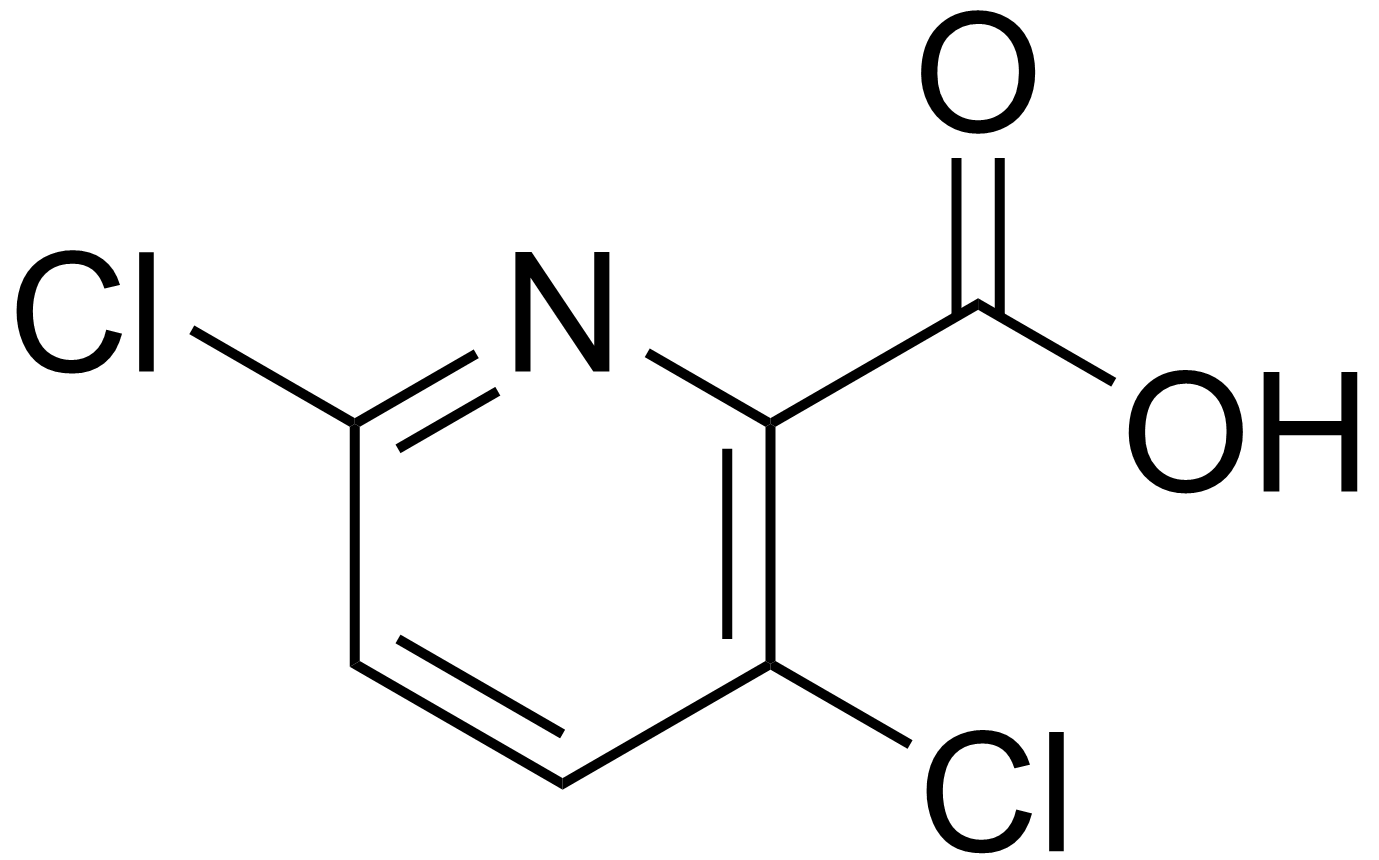

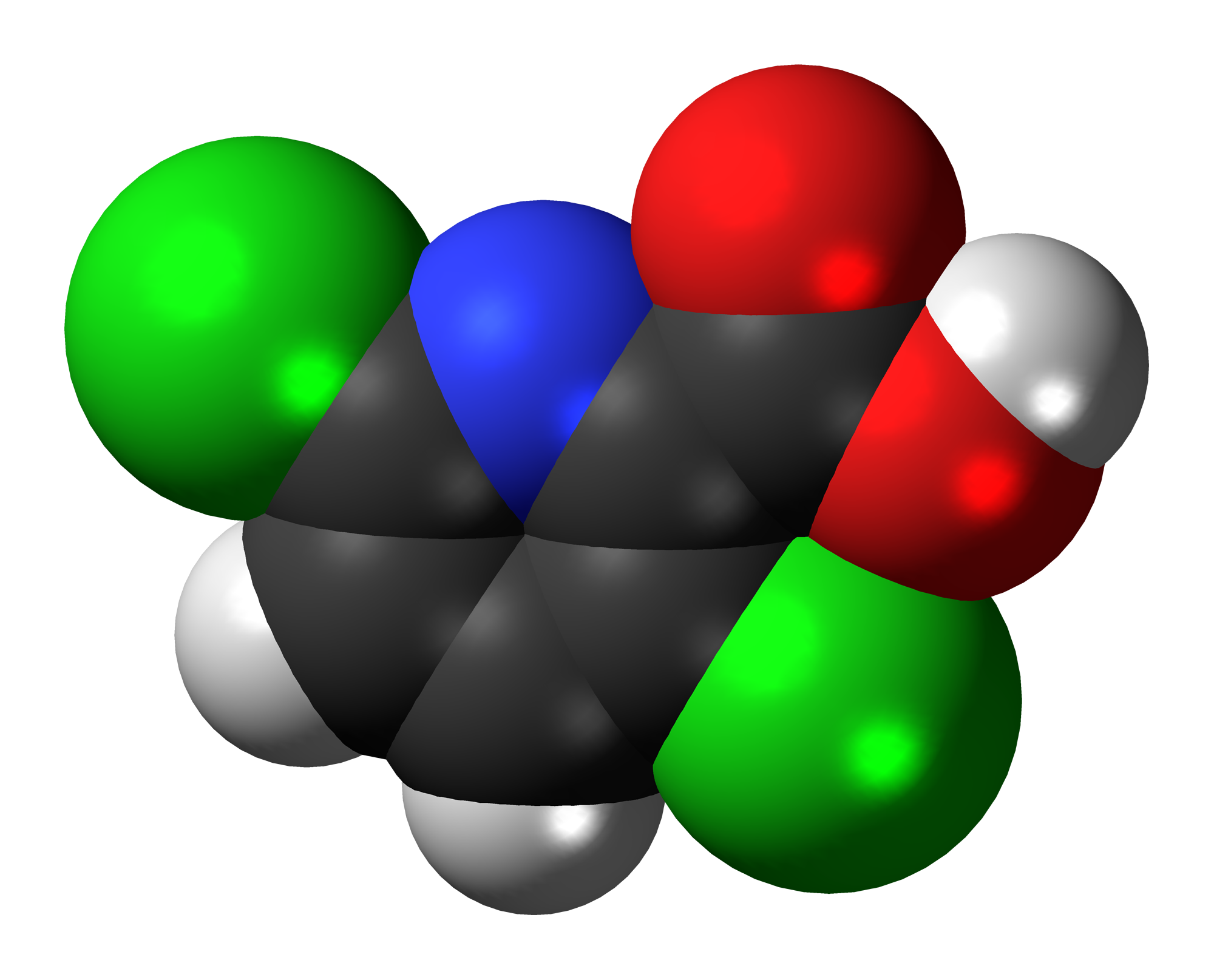

Names
- Preferred IUPAC name 3,6-Dichloropyridine-2-carboxylic acid
- Other names 3,6-Dichloropicolinic acid

Identifiers
CAS Number	1702-17-6
3D model (JSmol)	Interactive image; Interactive image
Abbreviations	3,6-DCP
ChEMBL	ChEMBL1650605
ChemSpider	14797
ECHA InfoCard	100.015.396
KEGG	C18779
PubChem CID	15553
UNII	10G14M0WDH
CompTox Dashboard (EPA)	DTXSID9029221
- InChI: InChI=1S/C6H3Cl2NO2/c7-3-1-2-4(8)9-5(3)6(10)11/h1-2H,(H,10,11) Key: HUBANNPOLNYSAD-UHFFFAOYSA-N; InChI=1/C6H3Cl2NO2/c7-3-1-2-4(8)9-5(3)6(10)11/h1-2H,(H,10,11) Key: HUBANNPOLNYSAD-UHFFFAOYAP
- SMILES: O=C(O)C1=C(Cl)C=CC(Cl)=N1; c1cc(nc(c1Cl)C(=O)O)Cl

Properties
Chemical formula	C_{6}H_{3}Cl_{2}NO_{2}
Molar mass	192.00
Appearance	White crystalline solid
Melting point	150 to 152 °C (302 to 306 °F; 423 to 425 K)
Solubility in water	~1000 ppm
- Except where otherwise noted, data are given for materials in their standard state (at 25 °C [77 °F], 100 kPa). verify (what is ?) Infobox references

Clopyralid (3,6-dichloro-2-pyridinecarboxylic acid) is a selective herbicide used for control of broadleaf weeds, especially thistles and clovers. Clopyralid is in the picolinic acid family of herbicides, which also includes aminopyralid, picloram, triclopyr, and several less common herbicides.

== Synthesis ==
The synthesis of clopyralid begins with picoline, which is photochemically chlorinated. The resulting trichloromethyl group is subsequently oxidized to a carboxyl group using nitric acid.

Synthesis of clopyralid

== Uses ==
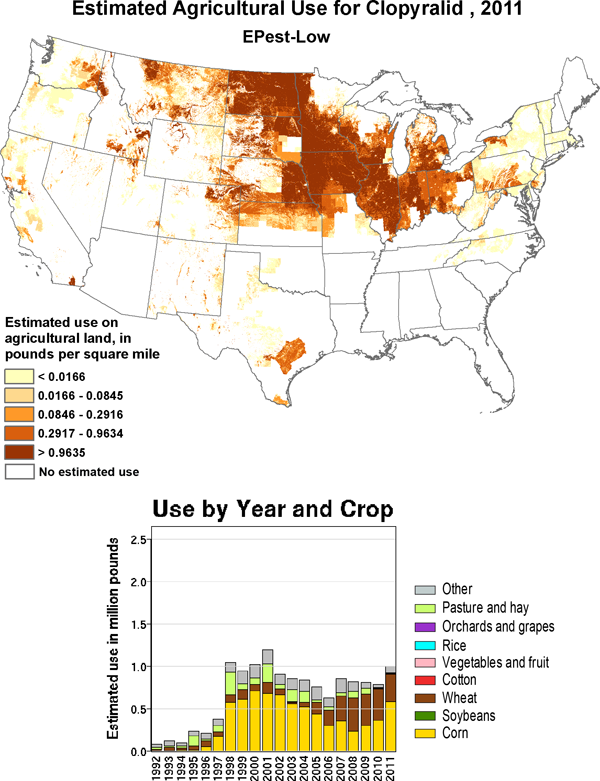
Estimated application rate in the U.S.

Clopyralid serves as an active ingredient in pesticides. The compound was introduced in 1975 by Dow Chemical as a selective, systemic auxin herbicide.

It is primarily used as a post-emergence herbicide in sugar beets and fodder beets to control various weeds, such as thistles, coltsfoot, cornflowers, knotweed, and chamomile. Clopyralid is also used in the cultivation of cereals, canola, corn, onions, and strawberries, as well as on ornamental shrubs and grassland. It is most effective during periods of vigorous plant growth.

For control of creeping thistle, Cirsium arvense, a noxious, perennial weed, clopyralid is one of the few effective herbicides available. It is particularly damaging to peas, tomatoes, and sunflowers, and can render potatoes, lettuce, and spinach inedible. It does not affect grasses (family Poaceae).

== Approval ==
Clopyralid is known for its ability to persist in dead plants and compost, and has accumulated to phytotoxic levels in finished compost in a few highly publicized cases. This first came to light in Washington, when during 2000 and 2001, residues of clopyralid were detected in commercial compost, and compost made at a municipal site damaged tomatoes and other garden plants planted in it. Word quickly spread to other local and state governments, and in 2002, Dow AgroSciences, the manufacturer of clopyralid, voluntarily deregistered it for use on domestic lawns in the US and it is banned in several US states, but it is found in consumer products in Europe such as Scotts Verdone Extra and Vitax Lawn Clear 2.

Clopyralid is used in Australia on industrial areas and agriculturally, to control broadleaf weeds in wheat, barley, oats, triticale, and fallow.

Clopyralid is licensed for lawn use in France and under these names: Bayer Jardin: Désherbant jeune gazon and Scanner Sélectif gazon Vilmorin: désherbant Gazon LONPAR. Brand names of clopyralid in the US market include Stinger, Transline, Reclaim, Curtail, Confront, Clopyr AG, Lontrel, Millennium Ultra, Millenium Ultra Plus and Redeem.
