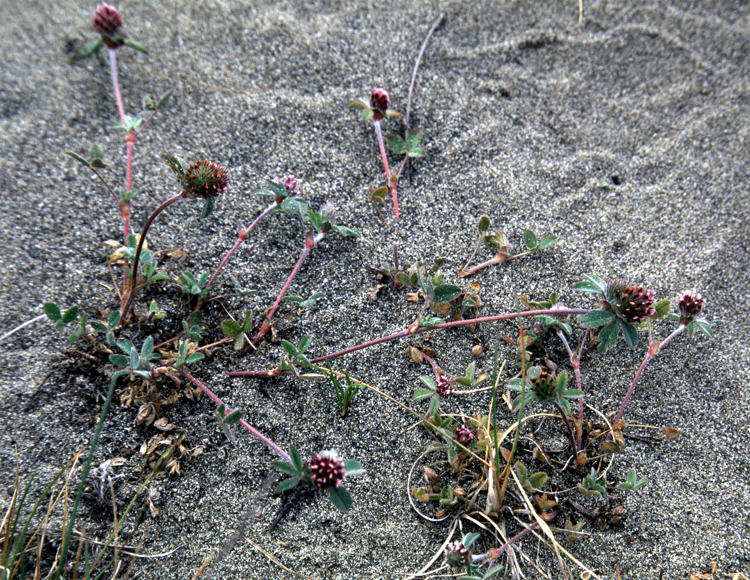

Scientific classification
- Kingdom: Plantae
- Clade: Tracheophytes
- Clade: Angiosperms
- Clade: Eudicots
- Clade: Rosids
- Order: Fabales
- Family: Fabaceae
- Subfamily: Faboideae
- Genus: Trifolium
- Species: T. macraei

Binomial name
- Trifolium macraei Hook. & Arn.

= Trifolium macraei =

Species of legume

Trifolium macraei is a species of clover known by the common names Chilean clover, double-head clover, and MacRae's clover.

== Description ==
It is an annual herb taking a decumbent or erect form. The leaves are made up of oval leaflets 1 to 2 centimeters (1/2 to 3/4 in) in length. The inflorescence is usually made up of two oval or rounded heads of flowers each measuring up to 1.5 cm wide. Each flower has a calyx of sepals which taper into densely hairy bristles. The flower corolla is purple or bicolored with white or pink.

== Distribution and habitat ==
It has a disjunct distribution, occurring on the coastline of Oregon and California in the United States, as well as in South America. It grows in coastal habitat, such as sand dunes, and disturbed areas.
