= Fluroxypyr =

Names
- Preferred IUPAC name [(4-Amino-3,5-dichloro-6-fluoropyridin-2-yl)oxy]acetic acid

Identifiers
CAS Number	69377-81-7; 81406-37-3 (1-Methylheptyl ester)
3D model (JSmol)	Interactive image
ChEBI	CHEBI:82017
ChemSpider	45757
ECHA InfoCard	100.126.253
PubChem CID	50465
UNII	8O40SHO197; 9W47M4YJ3Q (1-Methylheptyl ester)
CompTox Dashboard (EPA)	DTXSID2034627
- InChI: InChI=1S/C7H5Cl2FN2O3/c8-3-5(11)4(9)7(12-6(3)10)15-1-2(13)14/h1H2,(H2,11,12)(H,13,14) Key: MEFQWPUMEMWTJP-UHFFFAOYSA-N; InChI=1/C7H5Cl2FN2O3/c8-3-5(11)4(9)7(12-6(3)10)15-1-2(13)14/h1H2,(H2,11,12)(H,13,14) Key: MEFQWPUMEMWTJP-UHFFFAOYAO
- SMILES: Fc1nc(OCC(=O)O)c(Cl)c(c1Cl)N

Properties
Chemical formula	C_{7}H_{5}Cl_{2}FN_{2}O_{3}
Molar mass	255.03 g·mol^{−1}
Appearance	White solid
Density	1,09 g/cm^{3} (20 °C)
Melting point	232 to 233 °C (450 to 451 °F; 505 to 506 K)
Solubility in water	91 mg/L (20 °C)
- Except where otherwise noted, data are given for materials in their standard state (at 25 °C [77 °F], 100 kPa). Infobox references

Fluroxypyr is an herbicide in the class of synthetic auxins. It is used to control broadleaf weeds and woody brush. It is formulated as the 1-methylheptyl ester (fluroxypyr-MHE).
