= Chaetorellia australis =

Scientific classification
- Kingdom: Animalia
- Phylum: Arthropoda
- Clade: Pancrustacea
- Class: Insecta
- Order: Diptera
- Family: Tephritidae
- Subfamily: Tephritinae
- Tribe: Terelliini
- Genus: Chaetorellia
- Species: C. australis

Binomial name
- Chaetorellia australis Hering, 1940

Synonyms
- Chaetorellia hexachaeta ssp. australis Hering, 1940

Species of fly

Chaetorellia australis is a species of tephritid fruit fly known as the yellow starthistle peacock fly. It is used as an agent of biological pest control against the noxious weed yellow starthistle (Centaurea solstitialis).

The adult fly is light golden yellow in color with small black spots on its body and stripes on its wings. The male fly is about 4 millimeters long and the female is slightly longer due to her large ovipositor. The female lays up to 240 cylindrical eggs beneath the bracts on the flower heads of yellow starthistle. The larva emerges and tunnels into the flower head, where it feeds on developing seeds. A larva might destroy up to 90% of the developing seeds inside a given flower head. It overwinters inside the head and pupates into an adult fly. There are at least two generations per year. The first generation often utilizes the minor weed cornflower (Centaurea cyanus) before continuing reproduction on yellow starthistle. Sometimes the fly is difficult to introduce to an area if there is no cornflower growing nearby.

C. australis generally occurs in low numbers and does not seem to have had much impact on starthistle seed production.

This fly is native to southern Europe and the Mediterranean. It was first introduced to the United States for the purposes of biocontrol in 1988. It is now established throughout the northwestern United States.

== Distribution ==
Poland, to Greece, Turkey. Introduced to North America.
