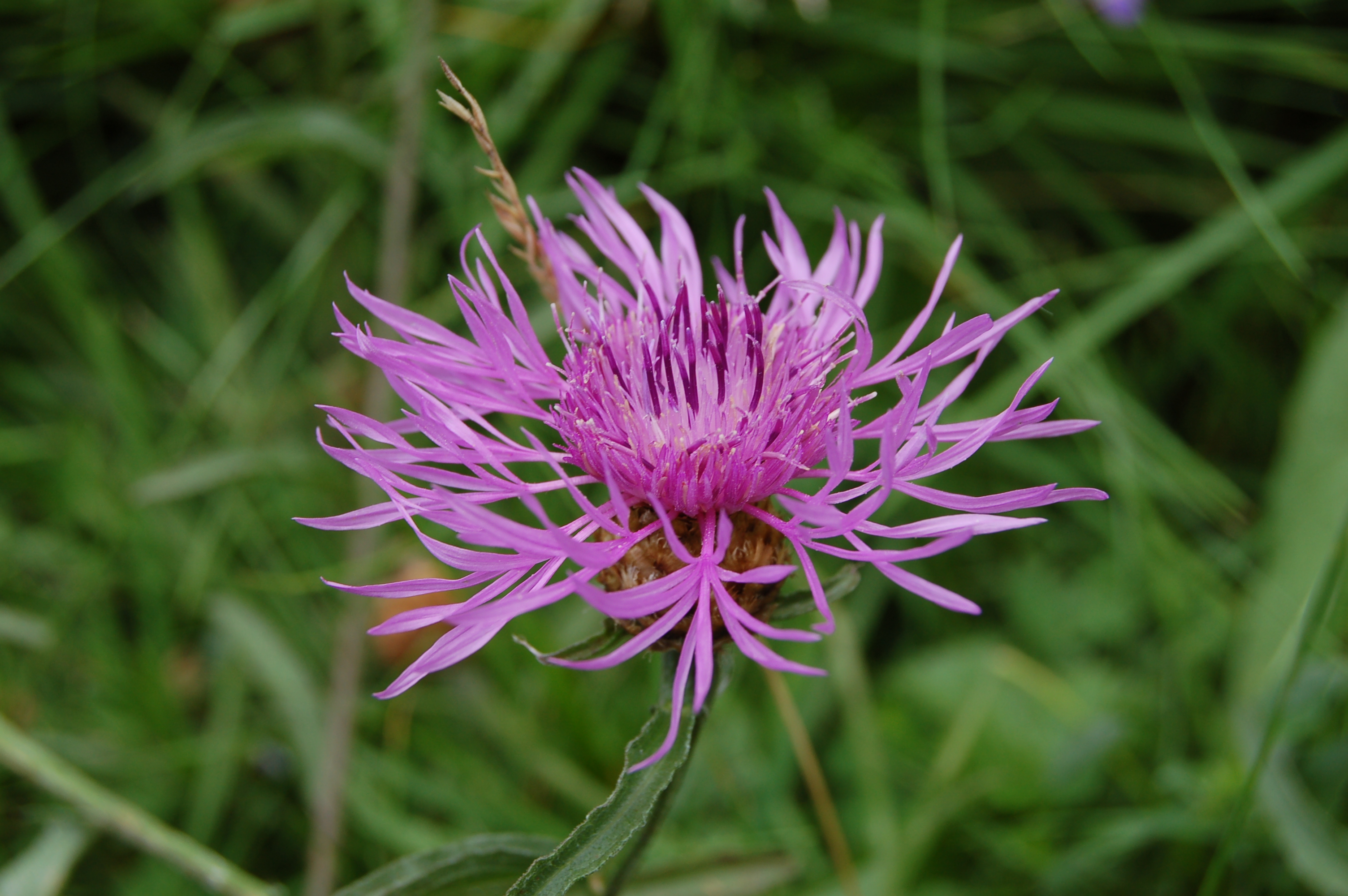

Scientific classification
- Kingdom: Plantae
- Clade: Tracheophytes
- Clade: Angiosperms
- Clade: Eudicots
- Clade: Asterids
- Order: Asterales
- Family: Asteraceae
- Genus: Centaurea
- Species: C. aspera

Binomial name
- Centaurea aspera L. 1753

= Centaurea aspera =

Species of flowering plant

Centaurea aspera, the rough star-thistle, is a species of Centaurea found in Europe and in New York, United States.

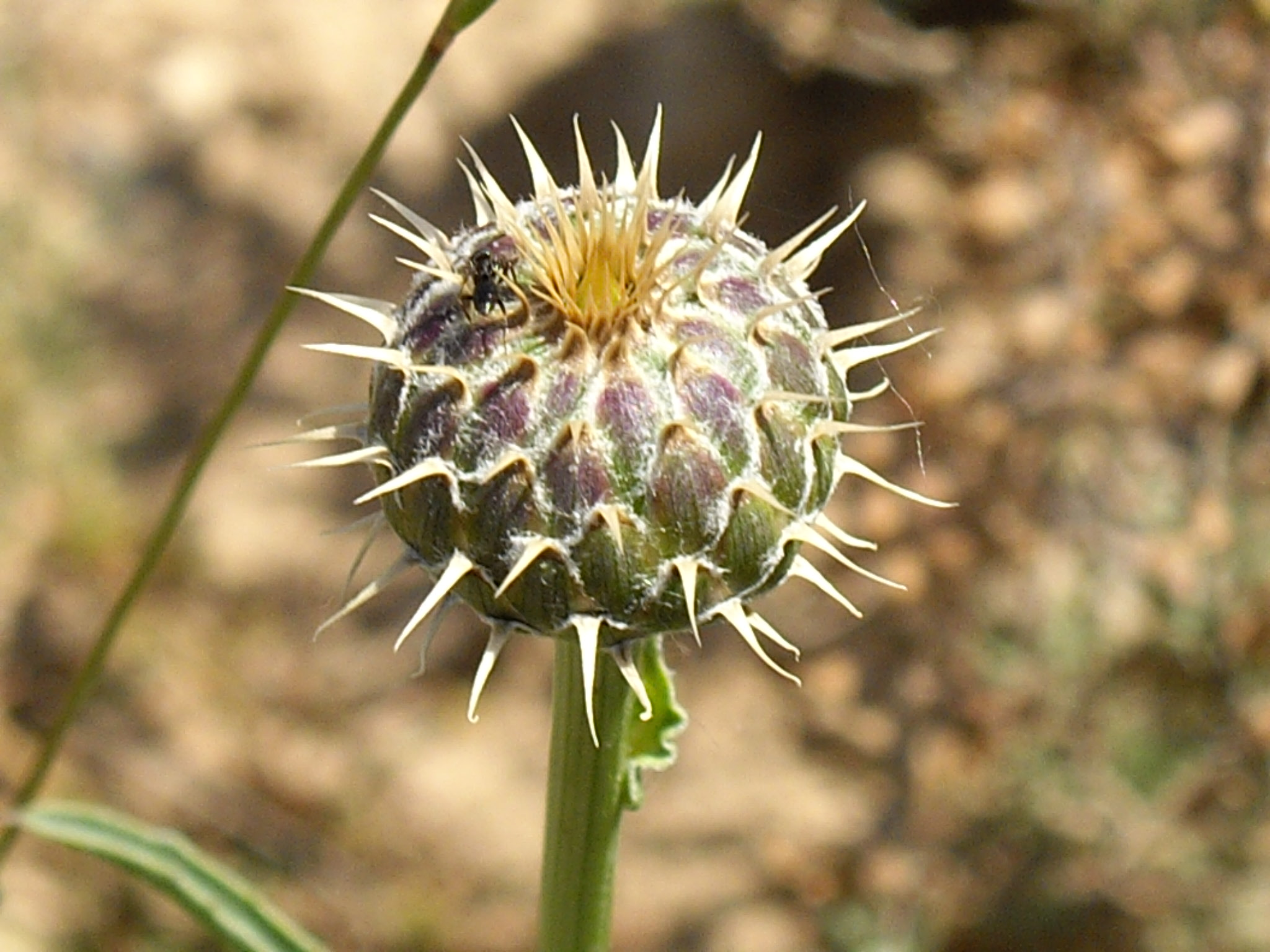
Flower Bud

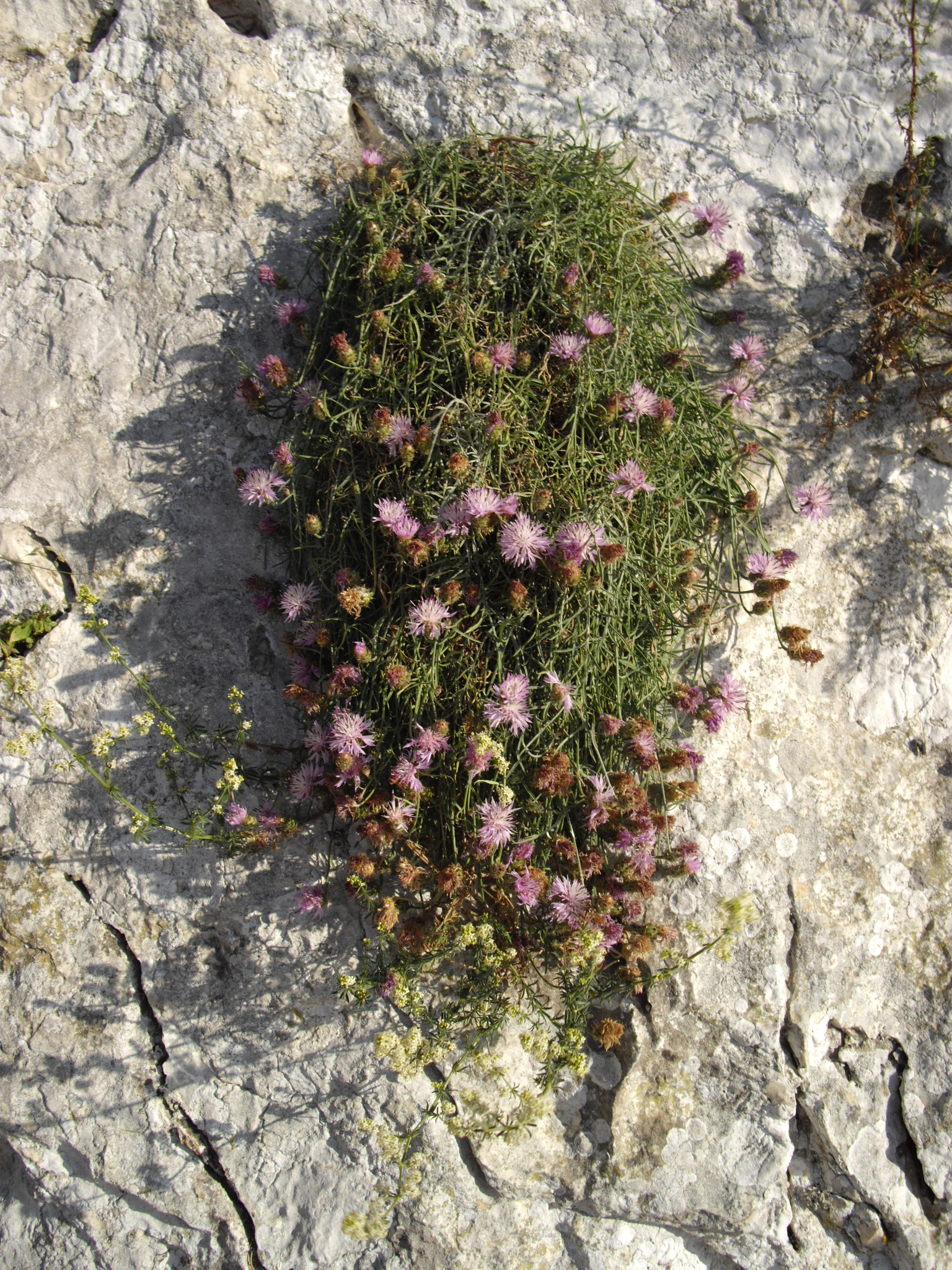
Plant

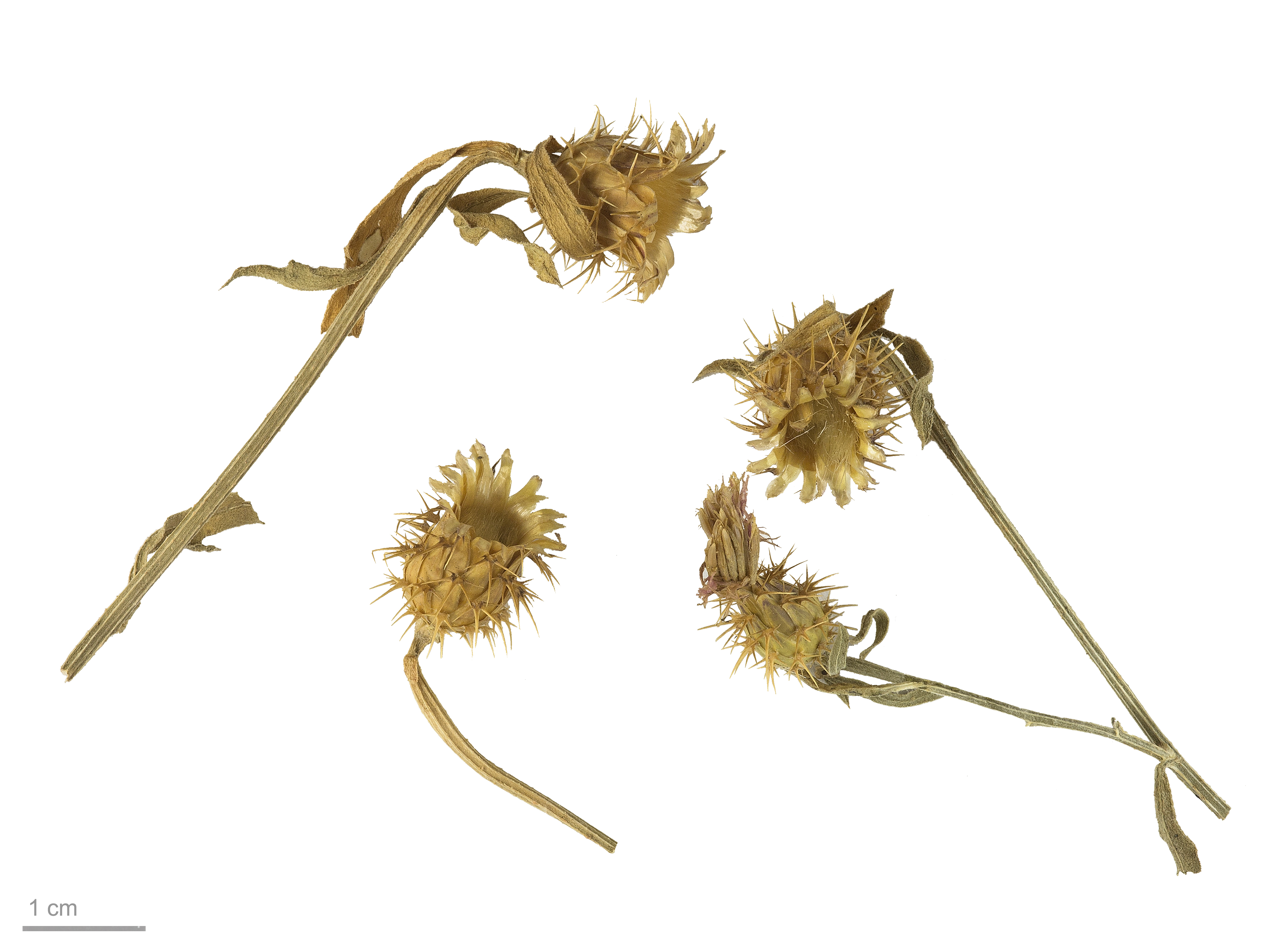
Centaurea aspera - MHNT
