= Triclopyr =

Chemical compound used as a herbicide

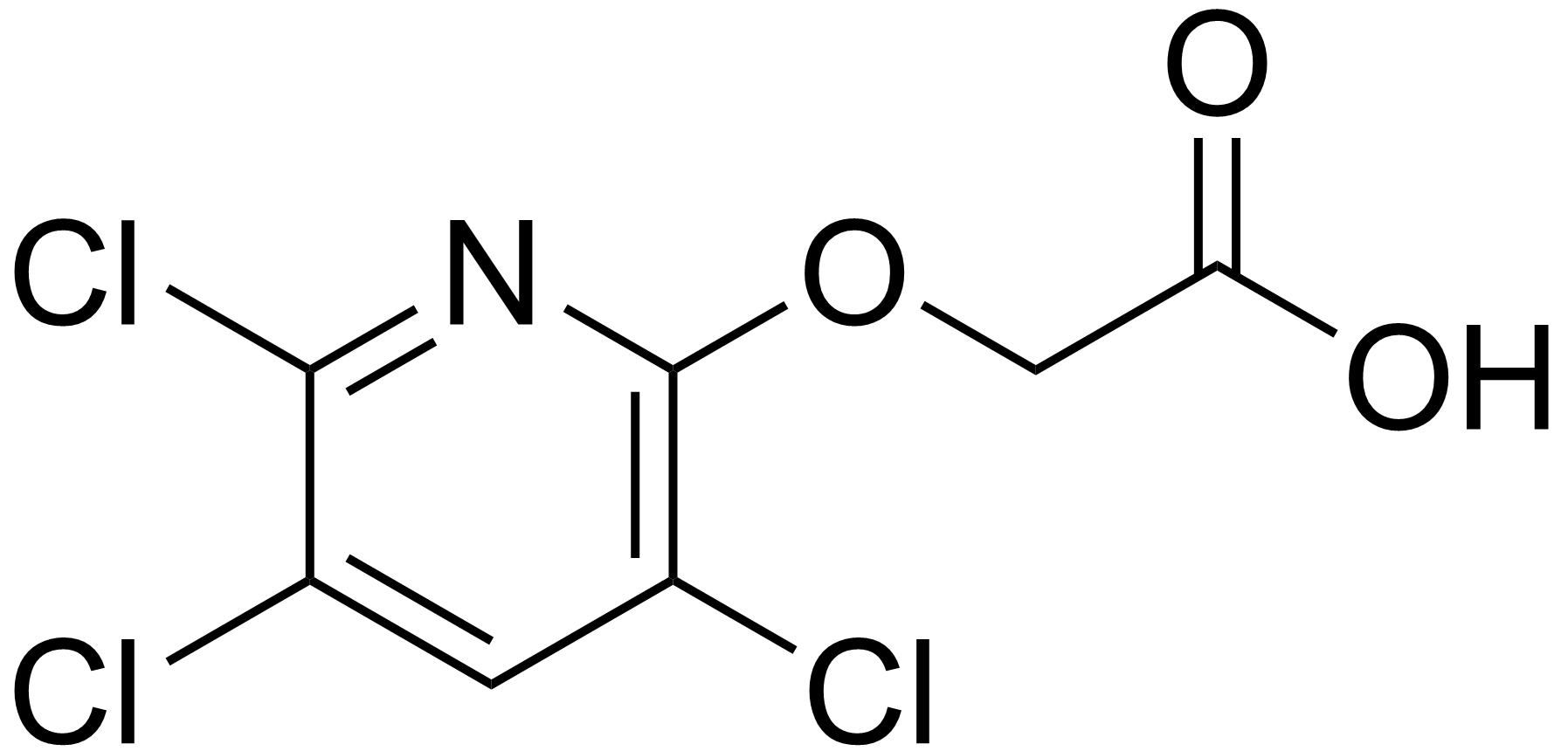

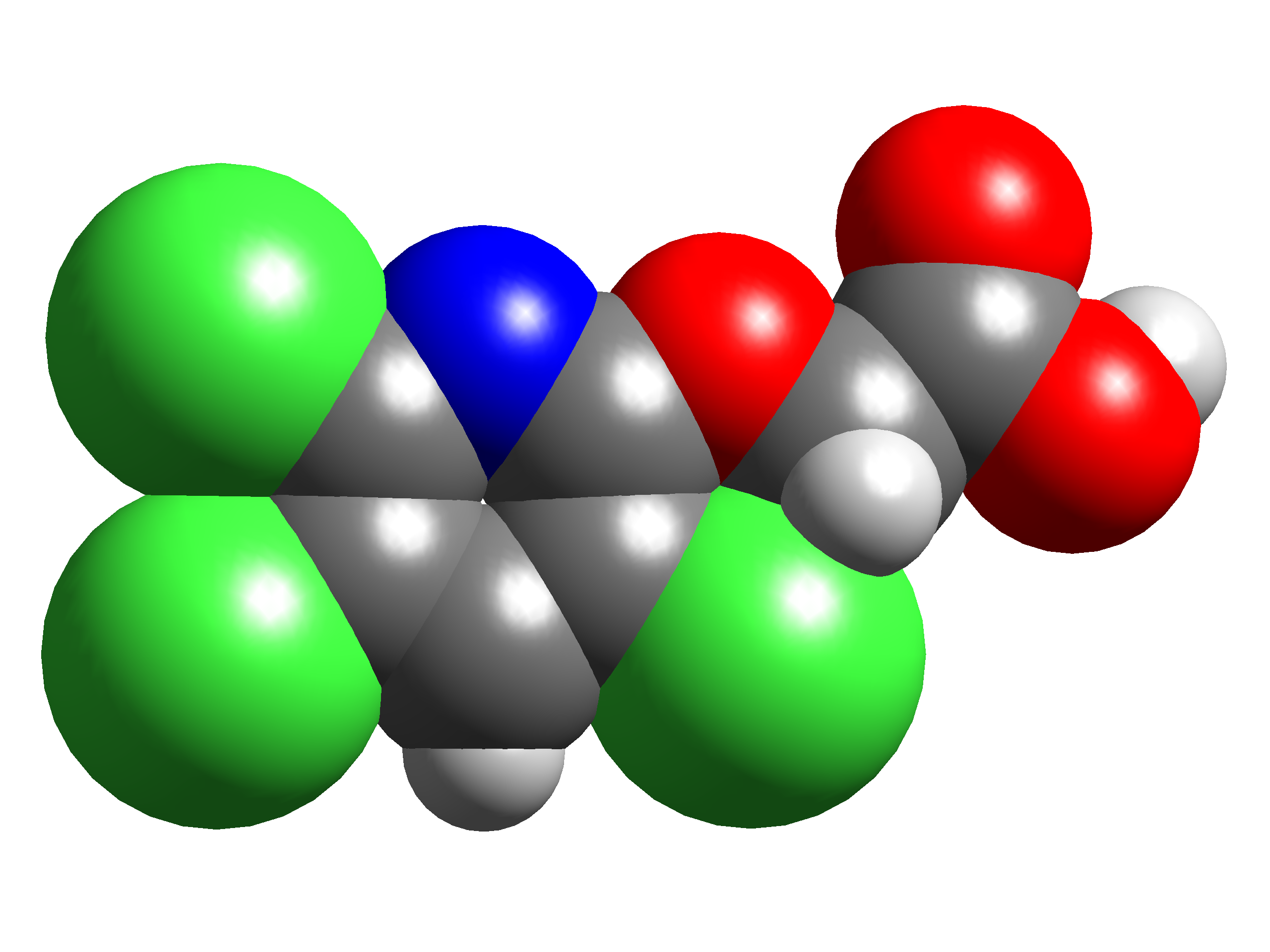

Names
- Preferred IUPAC name [(3,5,6-Trichloropyridin-2-yl)oxy]acetic acid
- Other names 3,5,6-TPA; Trident (Agriphar)

Identifiers
CAS Number	55335-06-3
3D model (JSmol)	Interactive image; Interactive image
ChEBI	CHEBI:9682
ChemSpider	37801
ECHA InfoCard	100.054.161
PubChem CID	41428
UNII	MV06PHJ6I0
CompTox Dashboard (EPA)	DTXSID0032497
- InChI: InChI=1S/C7H4Cl3NO3/c8-3-1-4(9)7(11-6(3)10)14-2-5(12)13/h1H,2H2,(H,12,13) Key: REEQLXCGVXDJSQ-UHFFFAOYSA-N; InChI=1/C7H4Cl3NO3/c8-3-1-4(9)7(11-6(3)10)14-2-5(12)13/h1H,2H2,(H,12,13) Key: REEQLXCGVXDJSQ-UHFFFAOYAE
- SMILES: ClC1=C(OCC(O)=O)N=C(Cl)C(Cl)=C1; C1=C(C(=NC(=C1Cl)Cl)OCC(=O)O)Cl

Properties
Chemical formula	C_{7}H_{4}Cl_{3}NO_{3}
Molar mass	256.46 g·mol^{−1}
Appearance	Fluffy solid
Melting point	148 to 150 °C (298 to 302 °F; 421 to 423 K)
Solubility in water	440 mg/L
Solubility in acetone	989 g/kg
Acidity (pK_{a})	2.68
- Except where otherwise noted, data are given for materials in their standard state (at 25 °C [77 °F], 100 kPa). verify (what is ?) Infobox references

Triclopyr, also Trichlopyr, formally [(3,5,6-trichloropyridin-2-yl)oxy]acetic acid, is an organic compound in the pyridine family of herbicides that is used as a systemic foliar type of herbicide and, secondarily, as a fungicide. Triclopyr is an acetic acid derivative, and so a monocarboxylic acid, with a pyridyloxy substituent: specifically, a pyridin-2-yloxy group substituted by chloro groups at positions 3, 5, and 6. It functions as an herbicide by mimicking the action of the plant growth hormone auxin.

== Structure and chemistry ==
Triclopyr is an acetic acid derivative, and so a monocarboxylic acid, with a pyridyloxy substiuent: specifically, a pyridin-2-yloxy group substituted by chloro groups at positions 3, 5, and 6.

Triclopyr is commercially produced through a two-step process. First, sodium 3,5,6-trichloro-2-pyridinolate is reacted with methyl chloroacetate in a polar solvent to form methyl [3,5,6-trichloropyridin-2-yl)oxy]acetate:

$\ce{C5HNCl3O- Na+ + CH2Cl-C(O)OCH3 -> C5HNCl3-O-CH2C(O)OCH3 + NaCl}$

In the second step, the methyl ester is hydrolysed under alkaline conditions, with an acidic work-up to afford the acid product. The yield obtained is improved by using a mineral acid like H_{2}SO_{4} over acetic acid:

$\ce{C5HNCl3-O-CH2C(O)OCH3 + NaOH -> C5HNCl3-O-CH2C(O)O- Na+ + CH3OH}$

$\ce{C5HNCl3-O-CH2C(O)O- Na+ + H2SO4 -> C5HNCl3-O-CH2C(O)OH + NaHSO4}$

Once the product has cooled, a decolorising agent is often added, such as NaClO or 30% H_{2}O_{2}.

Triclopyr is rapidly absorbed through plant leaves and roots. There, it mimics auxin, a plant hormone associated with plant growth regulation. Triclopyr is thought to acidify the cell wall, stimulating the activity of a membrane-bound ATPase proton pump. This causes uncontrolled cell division and vascular tissue destruction.

== History ==
Triclopyr triethylammonium (TEA) was first registered in 1979 in the United States for use as an herbicide in non-crop areas and forestry to control broadleaf weeds and woody plants. A year later, in 1980, a formulation containing triclopyr butoxyethyl ester (BEE) was registered for similar applications. Both formulations expanded their usage to turf sites in 1984, and in 1985, triclopyr BEE was specifically registered for use on rangeland and permanent grass pastures. In 1995, the triclopyr TEA formulation received registration for use on rice crops to manage broadleaf weed species.

Triclopyr's usage in the US in 2018 was 1.1 to 2 million pounds (500 to 910 t), and has held at roughly this level since 1998, by USGS estimates. It is mostly used on pasture and hay, with a small but consistent use on rice.

== Uses ==
As presented by the Wisconsin Department of Natural resources, triclopyr is a systemic herbicide and is believed selective in its control of dicotyledonous (broadleaf) weeds and woody plants, while leaving monocotyledonous plants (such as grasses, bulbs, and orchids) largely unaffected. Triclopyr based herbicides have been found effective at controlling invasive conifer species.

The fact sheet from this Wisconsin agency goes on to state, "It is a WSSA [Weed Science Society of America] Group 4 herbicide, meaning that the mechanism of action is by mimicking the plant growth hormone auxin", and that "[p]lant growth becomes abnormal and twisted following treatment, and plants decompose within one to two weeks after application". The guidance goes on to state that

Triclopyr needs to be applied to plants that are actively growing. If there is flowing water at a treated site, higher concentrations or a repeated application may be required.

Triclopyr is a widely used herbicide with active registrations in Australia, the United States, Brazil, Canada, Morocco, Paraguay, South Africa and Southeast Asia. In the United States, it is sold under the trade names Garlon, Remedy, Turflon, Weed-B-Gon, Brush-B-Gon, and RoundUp Brush Killer, and in the United Kingdom as SBK Brushwood Killer. It is also a major ingredient in Confront. In addition to weed control, triclopyr has also been documented for use in controlling rust fungus on soybean crops.

== Environmental effects ==
Triclopyr, including its ester and amine salt forms, is rapidly converted to the triclopyr acid form in the environment. The acid form is largely water-soluble, while the ester form exhibits lower solubility. Triclopyr has a low vapor pressure, indicating a limited tendency to volatilize into the atmosphere. In aquatic environments, triclopyr degradation is accelerated by light, with a reported half-life of approximately 1 day under light conditions. Without light, it is more persistent in water, with a half-life of around 142 days.

Triclopyr undergoes relatively rapid breakdown in soil, primarily through microbial activity. Soil half-lives typically range from 8 to 46 days, with longer persistence observed in deeper, less oxygenated soils. Although triclopyr is considered mobile in soil, studies have indicated limited movement below depths of 15 to 90 centimeters. Its movement in soil is influenced by factors such as organic matter content and rainfall. As a systemic herbicide, triclopyr is absorbed by plants through both leaves and roots and tends to accumulate in active growth regions. The rate of breakdown within plants varies widely depending on the species; reported half-lives in plants range from 3 to 24 days, with some plants like barley and wheat showing more rapid degradation.

The compound is slightly toxic to ducks (LD_{50} = 1698 mg/kg) and quail (LD_{50} = 3000 mg/kg). It has been found nontoxic to bees and marginally toxic to fish (rainbow trout LC_{50} (96 hr) = 117 ppm).

Garlon's fact sheet for a triclopyr ester—versus the triclopyr amine salt per se—indicates that further derivative to be highly toxic to fish, aquatic plants, and aquatic invertebrates, and so never used in waterways, wetlands, or other sensitive habitats.
