= Picloram =

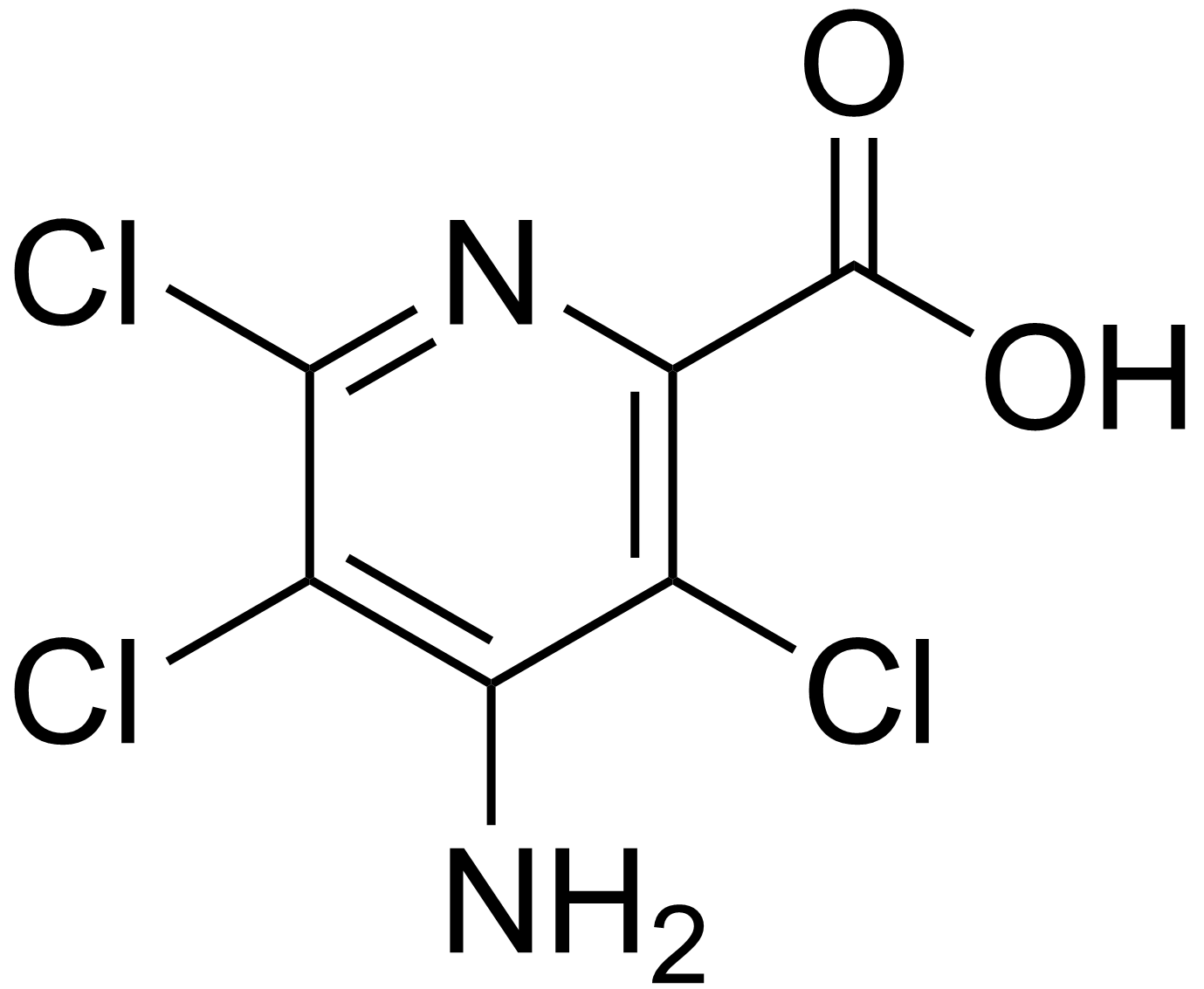

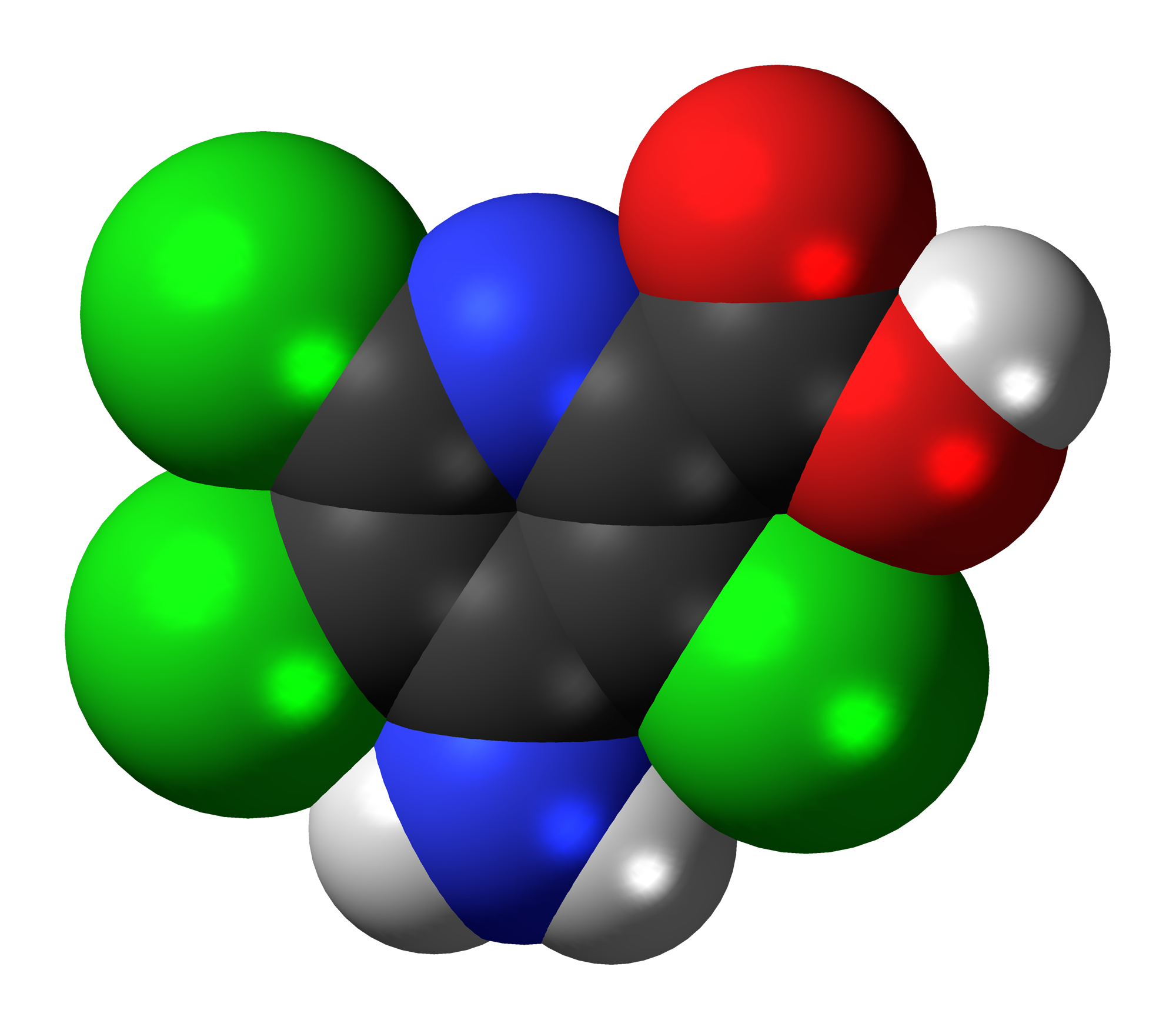

Names
- Preferred IUPAC name 4-Amino-3,5,6-trichloropyridine-2-carboxylic acid
- Other names Picloram; Tordon; Grazon

Identifiers
CAS Number	1918-02-1
3D model (JSmol)	Interactive image
Abbreviations	ATCP
ChEBI	CHEBI:34922
ChEMBL	ChEMBL461349
ChemSpider	15170
ECHA InfoCard	100.016.034
KEGG	C14310
PubChem CID	15965
UNII	O7437X49DW
CompTox Dashboard (EPA)	DTXSID1021160
- InChI: InChI=1S/C6H3Cl3N2O2/c7-1-3(10)2(8)5(9)11-4(1)6(12)13/h(H2,10,11)(H,12,13) Key: NQQVFXUMIDALNH-UHFFFAOYSA-N; InChI=1/C6H3Cl3N2O2/c7-1-3(10)2(8)5(9)11-4(1)6(12)13/h(H2,10,11)(H,12,13) Key: NQQVFXUMIDALNH-UHFFFAOYAR
- SMILES: Nc1c(Cl)c(Cl)nc(C(=O)O)c1Cl

Properties
Chemical formula	C_{6}H_{3}Cl_{3}N_{2}O_{2}
Molar mass	241.45 g·mol^{−1}
Appearance	colorless to white crystalline solid
Odor	chlorine-like
Melting point	218.5 °C (425.3 °F; 491.6 K) decomposes
Solubility in water	0.04% (20°C) 430 mg/L at 25 deg C
Vapor pressure	0.0000006 mmHg (35°C)

Hazards
- NIOSH (US health exposure limits)
PEL (Permissible)	TWA 15 mg/m^{3} (total) TWA 5 mg/m^{3} (resp)
REL (Recommended)	none established
IDLH (Immediate danger)	N.D.
- Except where otherwise noted, data are given for materials in their standard state (at 25 °C [77 °F], 100 kPa). verify (what is ?) Infobox references

Picloram is a systemic herbicide used for general woody plant control. It also controls a wide range of broad-leaved weeds, but most grasses are resistant. A chlorinated derivative of picolinic acid, picloram is in the pyridine family of herbicides.

Picloram can be sprayed on foliage, injected into plants, applied to cut surfaces, or placed at the base of the plant where it will leach to the roots. Once absorbed by the foliage, stem, or roots, picloram is transported throughout the plant.

Herbicides containing picloram are sold under a variety of brand names. Dow Chemicals and now Dow AgroSciences sell herbicides containing it under the brand name Tordon.

During the Vietnam War, picloram and other herbicides were combined to make Agent White (commercially available as Tordon 101) and enhanced Agent Orange, which was previously used by the British military during the Malayan Emergency. Large quantities of these herbicides were sprayed by U.S. forces in areas where they considered its long-term persistence desirable, such as inland forests. In 1974, 413,000 pounds (187 t) of picloram were used in the U.S., mainly by government and industry.

== Safety ==
Picloram is of moderate toxicity to the eyes and only mildly toxic on the skin. No history of human intoxication by picloram has been documented, so symptoms of acute exposure are difficult to characterize.

Picloram is the most persistent of its family of herbicides. It does not adhere to soil, so it may leach into groundwater, and has in fact been detected there. It is degraded in soil and water mainly by microbes. Picloram has very little tendency to accumulate in aquatic life.

Gardeners who use dung as fertilizer should check to make certain that the animal source has not grazed on picloram-treated hay, as the dung still has broadleaf-killing potency.

In regards to occupational exposures, the U.S. Occupational Safety and Health Administration has established a permissible exposure limit of 15 mg/m^{3} total exposure and 5 mg/m^{3} for respiratory exposure, over an eight-hour workshift.

=== Carcinogenicity ===
A 2026 study in Nature Medicine reported an association between picloram exposure signatures and the alarming rise in early-onset colorectal cancer. The researchers used DNA methylation scores as indirect markers of previous exposure to lifestyle and environmental factors, including pesticides. A higher picloram-related methylation score was associated with colorectal cancer diagnosed before age 50, compared with colorectal cancer diagnosed at age 70 or older. This association was replicated in a meta-analysis of nine colorectal cancer cohorts.

The same study also compared estimated pesticide use with cancer incidence in 94 United States counties over 21 years. Picloram use remained associated with early-onset colorectal cancer incidence after adjustment for socioeconomic factors and other pesticide use. The authors noted that picloram was first registered as a herbicide in the United States in 1964, so people who could have been exposed to it from childhood would often still be younger than 70 in 2026. They suggested that this could partly explain why the association was mainly seen for early-onset disease. The study found an association, but did not perform research to (dis)prove that picloram causes colorectal cancer. Therefore, the authors stated that further longitudinal and experimental research is needed to test causality, dose dependence and latency.
