= Lists of invasive species =

These are lists of invasive species by country or region. A species is regarded as invasive if it has been introduced by human action to a location, area, or region where it did not previously occur naturally (i.e., is not a native species), becomes capable of establishing a breeding population in the new location without further intervention by humans, and becomes a pest in the new location, threatening agriculture and/or the local biodiversity.

The term invasive species refers to a subset of those species defined as introduced species, for which see List of introduced species.

- 100 of the World's Worst Invasive Alien Species
- List of edible invasive species
- List of invasive fungi

List of invasive species in Africa

- List of invasive species in South Africa
  - List of invasive plant species in South Africa
    - Invasive succulent plants in South Africa

List of invasive species in Asia

- List of invasive species in India
- List of invasive species in Japan
- Invasive species in the Philippines
- Invasive species in the United Arab Emirates

Lists of invasive species in Australasia

- List of invasive species in Australia
  - List of invasive plant species in the Northern Territory
  - List of invasive plant species in New South Wales
- Invasive species in the Cook Islands
- Invasive species in Guam
- Invasive species in New Zealand

List of invasive species in Europe

- List of invasive alien species of Union concern (EU)
- Invasive species in the British Isles
- List of invasive non-native species in England and Wales
- List of invasive species in Italy
- List of invasive species in Portugal
- List of invasive species in Ukraine

List of invasive species in North America

- Invasive grasses in North America
- Invasive species in Mexico
- Invasive species in the United States
  - List of invasive species in California
    - List of invasive plant species in California
  - List of invasive species in Florida
    - List of invasive species in the Everglades
    - List of invasive marine fish in Florida
    - List of invasive plant species in Florida
  - Invasive species in Puerto Rico
  - List of invasive species in Texas
  - Invasive species in Hawaii
    - List of invasive plant species in Hawaii
  - Other
    - List of invasive aquatic species in Montana
    - List of invasive plant species in Arizona
    - List of invasive plant species in Connecticut
    - List of invasive plant species in Pennsylvania
    - List of invasive plant species in the Indiana Dunes
    - List of invasive plant species in Maryland
    - List of invasive plant species in Massachusetts
    - List of invasive plant species in Nevada
    - List of invasive plant species in New Jersey
    - List of invasive plant species in New Mexico
    - List of invasive plant species in New York
    - List of invasive plant species in Oregon
    - List of invasive plant species in Utah
    - List of invasive plant species in West Virginia
    - List of invasive plant species in Wisconsin

Invasive species in South America

- List of invasive species in Colombia

== See also ==
- Invasive species of Australian origin
- Invasive species of New Zealand origin
- National Pest Plant Accord (New Zealand)
- Weeds of National Significance (Australia)
- List of introduced species
  - List of introduced bird species
  - List of introduced mammal species
