= List of invasive plant species in Arizona =

Numerous plants have been introduced to Arizona, and many of them have become invasive species. The following are some of these species:

Picture	Scientific Name	Common Name
	Ailanthus altissima	tree of heaven
	Artemisia biennis	biennial wormwood
	Arundo donax	giant cane
	Atriplex suberecta	sprawling saltbush
	Avena fatua	common wild oat
	Bromus diandrus	great brome
	Bromus madritensis	compact brome
	Bromus sterilis	barren brome
	Carduus acanthoides	spiny plumeless thistle
	Carduus nutans	musk thistle
	Cenchrus ciliaris	buffelgrass
	Centaurea solstitialis	yellow star-thistle
	Cuscuta californica	chaparral dodder
	Cynodon dactylon	Bermuda grass
	Elaeagnus angustifolia	Russian olive
	Eragrostis cilianensis	stinkgrass
	Eragrostis lehmanniana	Lehamann lovegrass
	Kali tragus	prickly Russian thistle
	Kochia scoparia	burningbush
	Lactuca serriola	prickly lettuce
	Linaria dalmatica	Balkan toadflax
	Oncosiphon pilulifer	stinkweed
	Paspalum dilatatum	dallisgrass
	Pennisetum setaceum	crimson fountaingrass
	Psathyrostachys juncea	Russian wildrye
	Puccinellia distans	weeping alkaligrass
	Rubus armeniacus	Himalayan blackberry
	Saccharum ravennae	ravenngrass
	Solanum elaeagnifolium	silverleaf nightshade
	Sorghum halepense	johnsongrass
	Tamarix chinensis	five-stamen tamarisk
	Tamarix gallica	
	Tamarix parviflora	smallflower tamarisk
	Tamarix ramosissima	saltcedar
	Tribulus terrestris	goathead

== See also ==
- Invasive species in the United States
