= List of invasive plant species in Utah =

Numerous plants have been introduced to Utah, and many of them have become invasive species. The following are some of these species:

| Picture | Scientific Name | Common Name |
|---|---|---|
| | Artemisia biennis | biennial wormwood |
| | Arundo donax | giant cane |
| | Atriplex suberecta | sprawling saltbush |
| | Bromus diandrus | great brome |
| | Bromus sterilis | barren brome |
| | Carduus nutans | musk thistle |
| | Centaurea solstitialis | yellow star-thistle |
| | Conium maculatum | poison hemlock |
| | Cuscuta californica | chaparral dodder |
| | Eragrostis cilianensis | stinkgrass |
| | Kali tragus | prickly Russian thistle |
| | Puccinellia distans | weeping alkaligrass |
| | Rubus armeniacus | Himalayan blackberry |
| | Salix × fragilis | crack willow |
| | Solanum elaeagnifolium | silverleaf nightshade |
| | Tamarix chinensis | five-stamen tamarisk |
| | Tamarix gallica | French tamarisk |
| | Tamarix parviflora | smallflower tamarisk |
| | Tamarix ramosissima | saltcedar |

== See also ==
- Invasive species in the United States
