= List of invasive plant species in Nevada =

Numerous plants have been introduced to Nevada in the United States, and many of them have become invasive species. The following are some of these species:

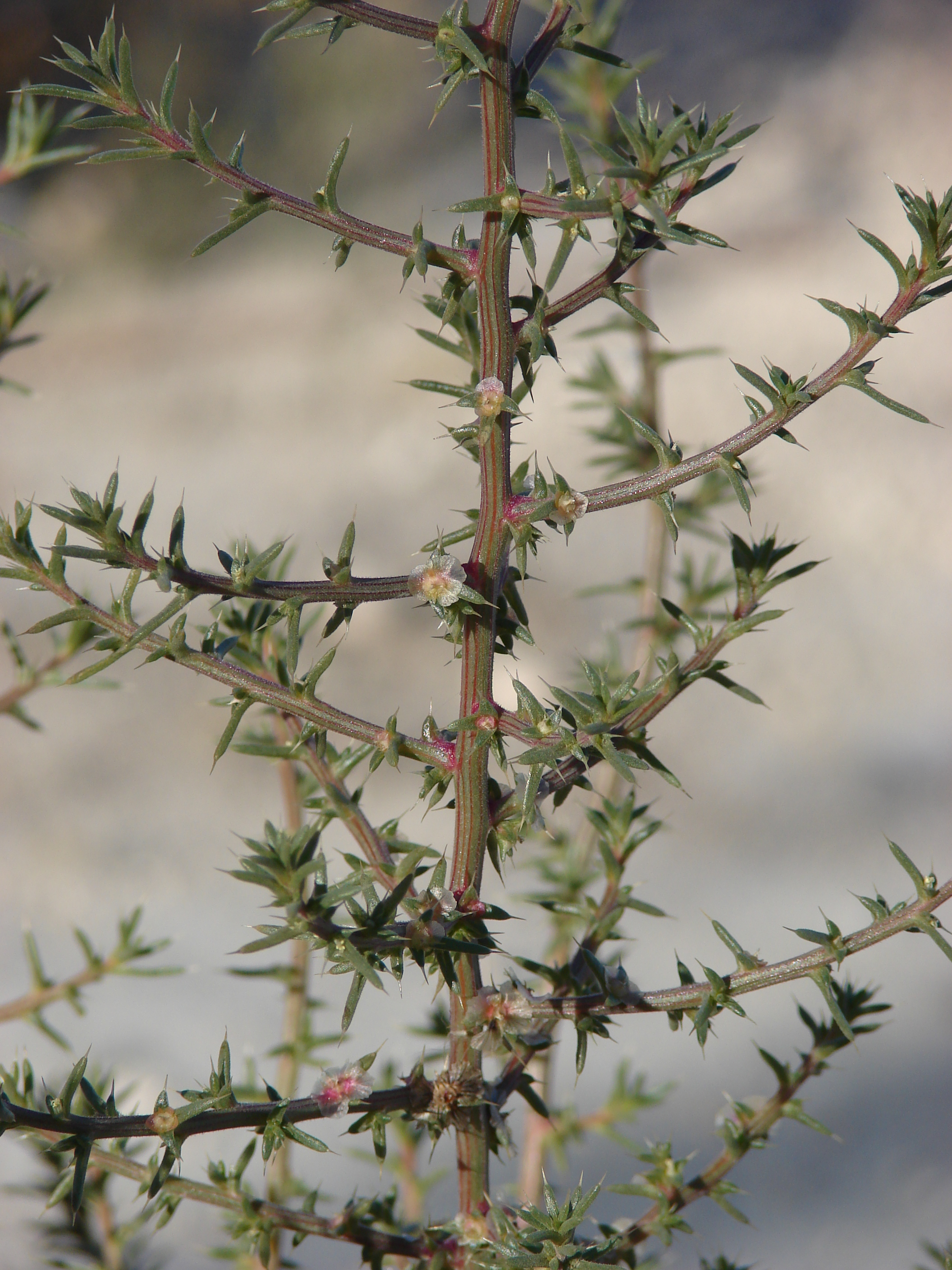
Kali tragus growing as a weed near Las Vegas, Nevada

Picture	Scientific Name	Common Name
	Artemisia biennis	biennial wormwood
	Arundo donax	giant cane
	Atriplex suberecta	sprawling saltbush
	Bromus diandrus	great brome
	Bromus sterilis	barren brome
	Bromus tectorum	drooping brome
	Carduus nutans	musk thistle
	Centaurea solstitialis	yellow star-thistle
	Cuscuta californica	chaparral dodder
	Eragrostis cilianensis	stinkgrass
	Kali tragus	prickly Russian thistle
	Puccinellia distans	weeping alkaligrass
	Rubus armeniacus	Himalayan blackberry
	Salix × fragilis	crack willow
	Setaria verticillata	hooked bristlegrass
	Solanum elaeagnifolium	silverleaf nightshade
	Tamarix chinensis	five-stamen tamarisk
	Tamarix gallica	French tamarisk
	Tamarix parviflora	smallflower tamarisk
	Tamarix ramosissima	saltcedar

== See also ==
- Invasive species in the United States
