= List of invasive plant species in Oregon =

Numerous plants have been introduced to Oregon, and many of them have become invasive species. The following are some of these species:

Picture	Scientific Name	Common Name
	Ailanthus altissima	tree of heaven
	Ammophila arenaria	marram grass
	Brachypodium sylvaticum	false-brome
	Bromus tectorum	drooping brome
	Buddleja davidii	summer lilac
	Carduus acanthoides	spiny plumeless thistle
	Carduus nutans	musk thistle
	Centaurea cyanus	cornflower
	Cirsium vulgare	spear thistle
	Clematis vitalba	old man's beard
	Cortaderia jubata	purple pampas grass
	Crataegus monogyna	common hawthorn
	Cyperus rotundus	coco-grass
	Cytisus scoparius	common broom
	Cytisus striatus	hairy-fruited broom
	Daphne laureola	spurge-laurel
	Egeria densa	large-flowered waterweed
	Elaeagnus angustifolia	Russian olive
	Euphorbia esula	green spurge
	Euphorbia myrsinites	myrtle spurge
	Fallopia sachalinensis	giant knotweed
	Foeniculum vulgare	Florence fennel
	Genista monspessulana	French broom
	Geranium lucidum	shining cranesbill
	Geranium robertianum	herb-Robert
	Hedera helix	common ivy
	Hedera hibernica	Atlantic ivy
	Ilex aquifolium	common holly
	Impatiens glandulifera	impatiens
	Iris pseudacorus	yellow flag
	Kali tragus	prickly Russian thistle
	Koenigia polystachya	Himalayan knotweed
	Linaria dalmatica	Balkan toadflax
	Linaria vulgaris	common toadflax
	Logfia gallica	narrowleaf cottonrose
	Lythrum salicaria	purple loosestrife
	Phalaris arundinacea	reed canary grass
	Pilosella aurantiaca	fox-and-clubs
	Reynoutria japonica	Japanese knotweed
	Rubus armeniacus	Himalayan blackberry
	Rubus laciniatus	cutleaf evergreen blackberry
	Salix × fragilis	crack willow
	Spartium	Spanish broom
	Tamarix ramosissima	saltcedar
	Torilis arvensis	spreading hedgeparsley
	Ulex	gorse

== See also ==
- Invasive species in the United States
