= List of invasive species in California =

Invasive species in California are introduced species of fauna−animals and flora−plants that are established and have naturalized within California.

Native plants and animals can become threatened endangered species from the spread of invasive species in natural habitats and/or developed areas (e.g. agriculture, transport, settlement).

== Animals ==
Invasive animal species include:

=== Mammals ===
- Black rat
- Nutria (also known as coypu)
- Fallow deer
- Axis deer (eradicated)
- Feral cat
- Feral dog
- Wild boar

=== Birds ===
- Common starling
- Red-masked parakeet
- Mute swan
- Rock dove
- House sparrow
- Eurasian collared dove
- Japanese white-eye
- Lilac-crowned amazon
- Yellow-headed amazon

=== Reptiles ===
- Southern watersnake
- Northern watersnake
- Red-eared slider
- Brown anole
- Jackson's chameleon
- Italian wall lizard
- Mediterranean house gecko
- Spiny softshell turtle

=== Amphibians ===
- American bullfrog
- African clawed frog
- Common coqui

=== Fish ===
- Snakehead (eradicated)

=== Invertebrates ===
- Apis mellifera scutellata — Africanized honeybee
- Bactrocera dorsalis — Oriental fruit fly (eradicated)
- Carcinus maenas — European green crab
- Corbicula fluminea — Asian clam, golden freshwater clam
- Eriocheir sinensis — Chinese mitten crab
- Euwallacea fornicatus — Polyphagous and Kuroshio shot hole borers
- Limnoperna fortunei — Golden mussel
- Linepithema humile — Argentine ant
- Liriomyza trifolii — American serpentine leaf miner
- Milax gagates — greenhouse slug
- Potamopyrgus antipodarum — New Zealand mud snail
- Pomacea canaliculata — channeled apple snail
- Solenopsis invicta — red imported fire ant
- Theba pisana — white garden snail

== Plants ==
Invasive plant species include:

- Aegilops triuncialis — barbed goat grass
- Acacia melanoxylon — black acacia
- Ailanthus altissima — tree-of-Vanessa
- Arundo donax — giant reed
- Carpobrotus edulis — iceplant
- Centaurea solstitialis — yellow starthistle
- Cirsium vulgare — bull thistle
- Cortaderia jubata — pampas grass
- Eucalyptus camaldulensis — red gum
- Eucalyptus globulus — blue gum
- Ficus carica — edible fig
- Fraxinus uhdei — shamel ash, evergreen ash
- Hedera canariensis — Algerian ivy, 'California' ivy
- Ipomoea indica — blue morning glory
- Ligustrum ovalifolium — 'California' privet
- Marrubium vulgare — horehound
- Mesembryanthemum crystallinum — common iceplant
- Nicotiana glauca — tree tobacco
- Pennisetum setaceum — fountain grass
- Ricinus communis — castor bean
- Rubus armeniacus — Himalayan blackberry
- Schinus terebinthifolius — Brazilian pepper tree
- Tamarix ramosissima — salt cedar, tamarisk
- Ulex europaeus — common gorse
- Vachellia tortilis — umbrella thorn
- Vinca major— periwinkle
- Washingtonia robusta — Mexican fan palm
- Zantedeschia aethiopica — calla lily
- Genista monspessulana - French broom
- Spartium junceum - Spanish broom

== See also ==
- List of native plants in California
- List of invasive plant species in California
- List of invasive species
- Lists of invasive species
- Invasive species in the United States
