= Streptomyces halophytocola =

Scientific classification
- Domain: Bacteria
- Kingdom: Bacillati
- Phylum: Actinomycetota
- Class: Actinomycetes
- Order: Streptomycetales
- Family: Streptomycetaceae
- Genus: Streptomyces
- Species: S. halophytocola

Binomial name
- Streptomyces halophytocola Qin et al. 2013

Type strain
- KCTC 19890, KLBMP 1284, NBRC 108770

Species of bacterium

Streptomyces halophytocola is a bacterium species from the genus of Streptomyces which has been isolatedfrom the tree Tamarix chinensis in Nantong in the Jiangsu province in China.

== See also ==
- List of Streptomyces species
