= List of invasive plant species in South Africa =

Plants that have been recorded as invasive

This is a list of invasive plant species in South Africa.

== Species ==
- Acacia baileyana
- Acacia cyclops
- Acacia dealbata
- Acacia implexa
- Acacia longifolia
- Acacia mearnsii
- Acacia pycnantha
- Acacia saligna
- Agave
- Agave americana
- Anredera cordifolia
- Araujia sericifera
- Argemone mexicana
- Caesalpinia decapetala
- Cardiospermum halicacabum
- Carduus nutans
- Castor oil plant
- Chromolaena odorata
- Commelina
- Commelina benghalensis
- Echium plantagineum
- Eichhornia crassipes
- Eucalyptus camaldulensis
- Eucalyptus globulus
- Hakea sericea
- Ipomoea
- Ipomoea alba
- Ipomoea indica
- Ipomoea purpurea
- Lantana camara
- Nephrolepis exaltata
- Nerium
- Opuntia
- Pereskia aculeata
- Pine
- Pinus halepensis
- Pinus patula
- Pinus pinaster
- Pittosporum undulatum
- Populus alba
- Salix × fragilis
- Salvinia molesta
- Sisal
- Solanum mauritianum
- Spartium
- Stone pine
- Tradescantia fluminensis
