= List of invasive plant species in Maryland =

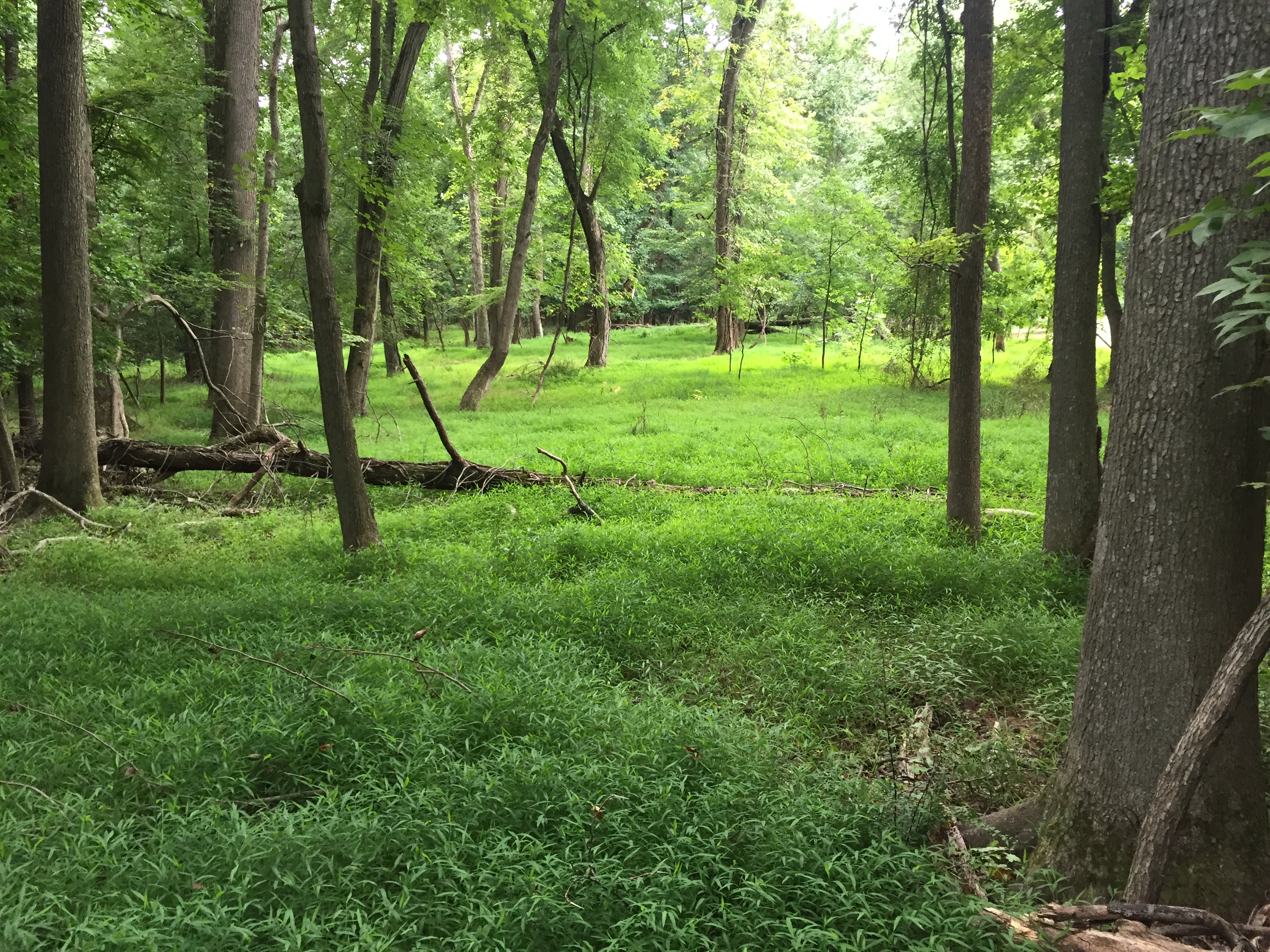
Japanese stiltgrass (Microstegium vimineum) invasion of a forest in Greenbelt, Maryland

Numerous non-native plants have been introduced to Maryland in the United States and many of them have become invasive species. The following is a list of some non-native invasive plant species established in Maryland.

== Terrestrial plants ==
Picture	Scientific Name	Common Name
	Acer platanoides	Norway Maple
	Ailanthus altissima	Tree of Heaven
	Ajuga reptans	Bugleweed
	Akebia quinata	Chocolate vine
	Albizia julibrissin	Persian silk tree
	Alliaria petiolata	Garlic Mustard
	Allium vineale	Wild Garlic
	Ampelopsis brevipedunculata	Porcelain Berry
	Aralia elata	Japanese angelica tree
	Arctium minus	Burdock
	Artemisia vulgaris	Mugwort
	Arthraxon hispidus	Small carpetgrass
	Arundo donax	Giant cane
	Berberis thunbergii	Japanese Barberry
	Bromus tectorum	Cheatgrass
	Broussonetia papyrifera	Paper Mulberry
	Cardamine impatiens	Narrowleaf Bittercress
	Carduus acanthoides	Plumeless Thistle
	Carduus nutans	Musk Thistle
	Carex kobomugi	Asiatic Sand Sedge
	Celastrus orbiculatus	Oriental Bittersweet
	Centaurea maculosa	Spotted Knapweed
	Cirsium arvense	Creeping Thistle
	Cirsium vulgare	Bull Thistle
	Clematis terniflora	Sweet Autumn Clematis
	Commelina communis	Asiatic dayflower
	Conium maculatum	Poison hemlock
	Convolvulus arvensis	Field bindweed
	Cortaderia selloana	Pampas grass
	Cynodon dactylon	Bermuda grass
	Cytisus scoparius	Scotch broom
	Dioscorea polystachya	Chinese yam
	Dipsacus fullonum	Fuller's teasel
	Elaeagnus umbellata	Autumn Olive
	Eragrostis curvula	Weeping lovegrass
	Euonymus fortunei	Winter Creeper
	Fatoua villosa	Mulberryweed
	Ficaria verna	Lesser Celandine
	Galanthus nivalis	Snowdrop
	Reynoutria japonica (syn. Fallopia japonica)	Japanese Knotweed
	Frangula alnus	Glossy Buckthorn
	Hedera helix	English Ivy
	Hemerocallis fulva	Daylily
	Heracleum mantegazzianum	Giant Hogweed
	Hesperis matronalis	Dame's rocket
	Hibiscus syriacus	Rose of Sharon
	Humulus japonicus	Japanese Hops
	Iris pseudacorus	Yellow iris
	Koelreuteria paniculata	Goldenrain tree
	Lactuca serriola	Prickly lettuce
	Lamium amplexicaule	Common henbit
	Lamium galeobdolon	Yellow archangel
	Lespedeza cuneata	Chinese bushclover
	Ligustrum sinense	Chinese privet
	Ligustrum vulgare	Common privet
	Lonicera japonica	Japanese Honeysuckle
	Lonicera maackii	Amur Honeysuckle
	Lonicera morrowi	Morrow's Honeysuckle
	Lonicera standishii	Standish's Honeysuckle
	Liriope sp.	Liriope
	Lonicera tatarica	Tatarian Honeysuckle
	Lotus corniculatus	Bird's-foot trefoil
	Lysimachia nummularia	Creeping jenny
	Lythrum salicaria	Purple Loosestrife
	Mahonia bealei	Beale's barberry
	Melilotus albus	White sweet clover
	Microstegium vimineum	Japanese Stiltgrass
	Miscanthus sinensis	Chinese Silvergrass
	Mollugo verticillata	Green carpetweed
	Morus alba	White Mulberry
	Morus australis	Chinese mulberry
	Murdannia keisak	Marsh Dayflower
	Oplismenus undulatifolius	Wavyleaf Basketgrass
	Ornithogalum umbellatum	Star-of-Bethlehem
	Pachysandra terminalis	Japanese pachysandra
	Paulownia tomentosa	Princesstree, Paulownia
	Pennisetum alopecuroides	Chinese fountaingrass
	Perilla frutescens	Perilla
	Persicaria perfoliata	Mile-a-minute
	Phalaris arundinacea	Reed Canarygrass
	Phragmites australis	Phragmites
	Phyllostachys aurea	Golden bamboo
	Phyllostachys aureosulcata	Yellow groove bamboo
	Poncirus trifoliata	Trifoliate orange
	Pueraria montana var. lobata	Kudzu
	Pyrus calleryana	Callery/Bradford Pear
	Quercus acutissima	Sawtooth oak
	Rhodotypos scandens	Jetbead
	Rorippa sylvestris	Yellow fieldcress
	Rosa multiflora	Multiflora Rose
	Rubus phoenicolasius	Wineberry
	Saccharum ravennae	Ravennagrass
	Schoenoplectus mucronatus	Bog Bulrush
	Securigera varia	Crown vetch
	Sorghum bicolor	Shattercane
	Sorghum halepense	Johnsongrass
	Spiraea japonica	Japanese spiraea
	Stellaria media	Chickweed
	Stellaria pallida	Lesser chickweed
	Taraxacum officinale	Common dandelion
	Urtica dioica subsp. dioica	European stinging nettle
	Verbascum thapsus	Common mullein
	Veronica hederifolia	Ivy-leaved Speedwell
	Viburnum dilatatum	Linden viburnum
	Vinca major	Greater periwinkle
	Vinca minor	Lesser periwinkle
	Vitex rotundifolia	Beach vitex
	Wisteria sinensis	Chinese Wisteria
	Wisteria floribunda	Japanese Wisteria

== Aquatic plants ==
Scientific Name	Common Name
Alternanthera philoxeroides	Alligator weed
Didymosphenia geminata	Didymo, Rock Snot
Egeria densa	Brazilian Waterweed
Eichhornia crassipes	Water Hyacinth
Hydrilla verticillata	Hydrilla
Iris pseudacorus	Yellow iris
Myriophyllum aquaticum	Parrot Feather
Myriophyllum spicatum	Eurasian Water-Milfoil
Potamogeton crispus	Curly Leaved Pondweed
Prymnesium parvum	Golden Algae
Salvinia molesta	Giant Salvinia
Trapa natans	Water Chestnut

== See also ==
- Invasive species in the United States
