= List of invasive species in Italy =

Many species of plants, animals, and other organisms are considered invasive species in Italy.

== Plants ==
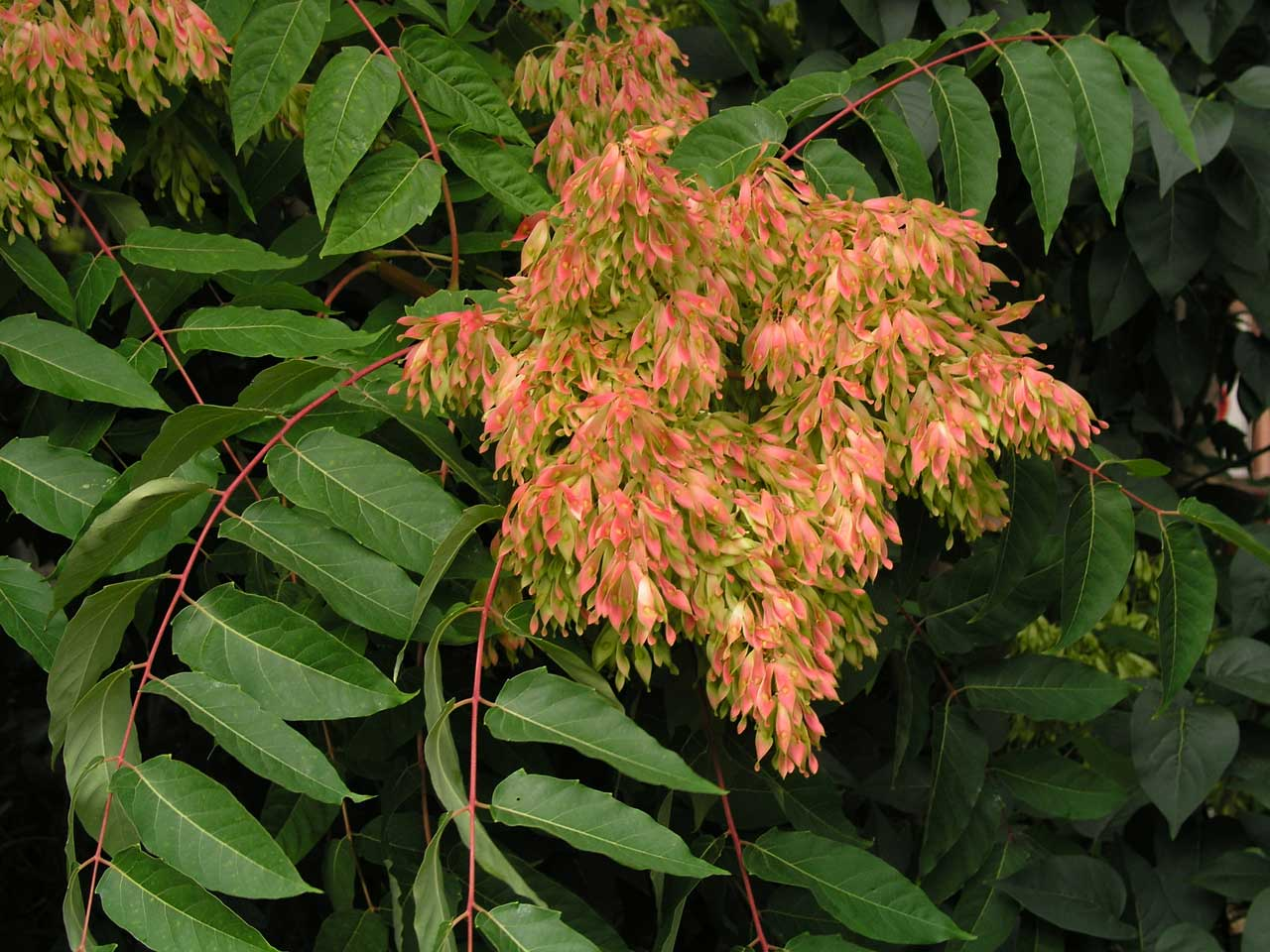
A female of Ailanthus altissima bearing a heavy load of seeds in Valladolid, Spain

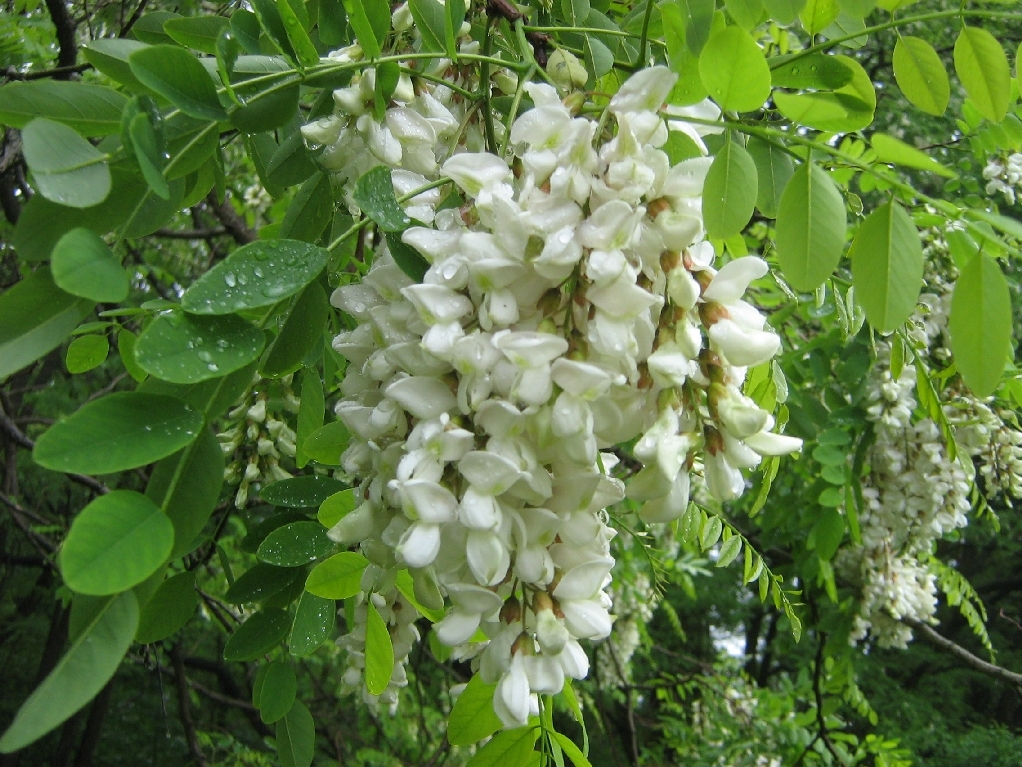
Black locust (Robinia pseudoacacia)

- Ailanthus altissima (Tree of heaven)
- Amorpha fruticosa (Desert false indigo)
- Ambrosia artemisiifolia (Amrosia artemisifolia)
- Carpobrotus edulis (Hottentot fig)
- Caulerpa racemosa (Grape caulerpa)
- Caulerpa taxifolia, Mediterranean clone
- Crassula helmsii (Australian swamp stonecrop)
- Eichhornia crassipes (Water hyacinth)
- Elodea canadensis (Canadian pondweed)
- Gleditsia triacanthos (Honey locust)
- Heracleum mantegazzianum (Giant hogweed)
- Hydrocotyle ranunculoides (Floating pennywort)
- Impatiens glandulifera (Himalayan balsam)
- Myriophyllum aquaticum (Parrot feather)
- Reynoutria japonica (syn. Fallopia japonica) (Japanese knotweed)
- Robinia pseudoacacia (Black locust)

== Fungi ==
- Ophiostoma ulmi (Dutch elm disease)

== Animals ==
=== Platyhelminthes ===
- Bothriocephalus acheilognathi (Asian tapeworm)
- Bipalium kewense (Shovel-headed garden worm)

=== Molluscs ===
==== Marine ====
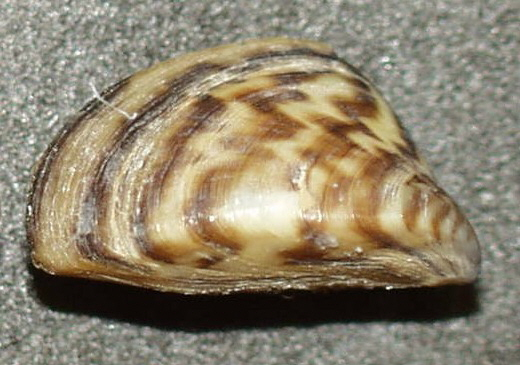
A shell of the zebra mussel, Dreissena polymorpha

- Crassostrea gigas (Pacific oyster)
- Crepidula fornicata (Common slipper shell)
- Rapana Venosa (Veined rapa whelk)

==== Freshwater ====
- Corbicula fluminea (Freshwater bivalve mollusk)
- Dreissena polymorpha (Zebra mussel)
- Potamopyrgus antipodarum (New Zealand mud snail)
- Sinanodonta woodiana (Chinese pond mussel)

=== Crustaceans ===
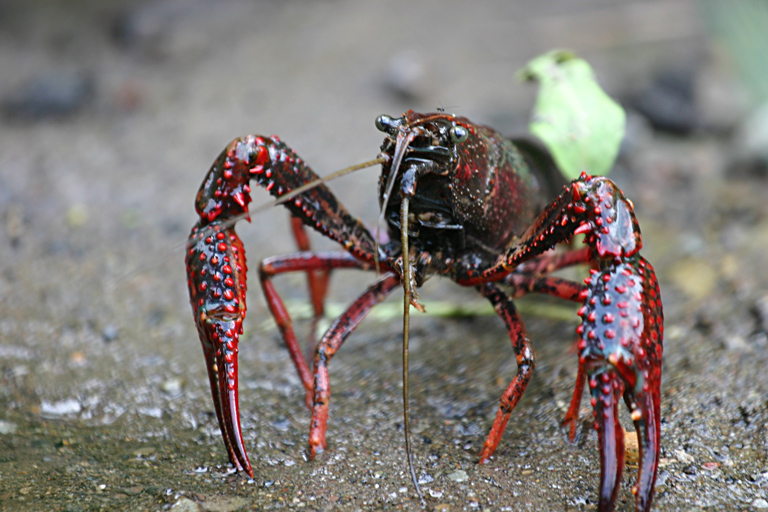
Louisiana crawfish (Procambarus clarkii)

- Dikerogammarus villosus (Killer shrimp)
- Eriocheir sinensis (Chinese mitten crab)
- Orconectes limosus (Eastern crayfish)
- Pacifastacus leniusculus (Signal crayfish)
- Procambarus clarkii (Louisiana crawfish)

=== Insects ===
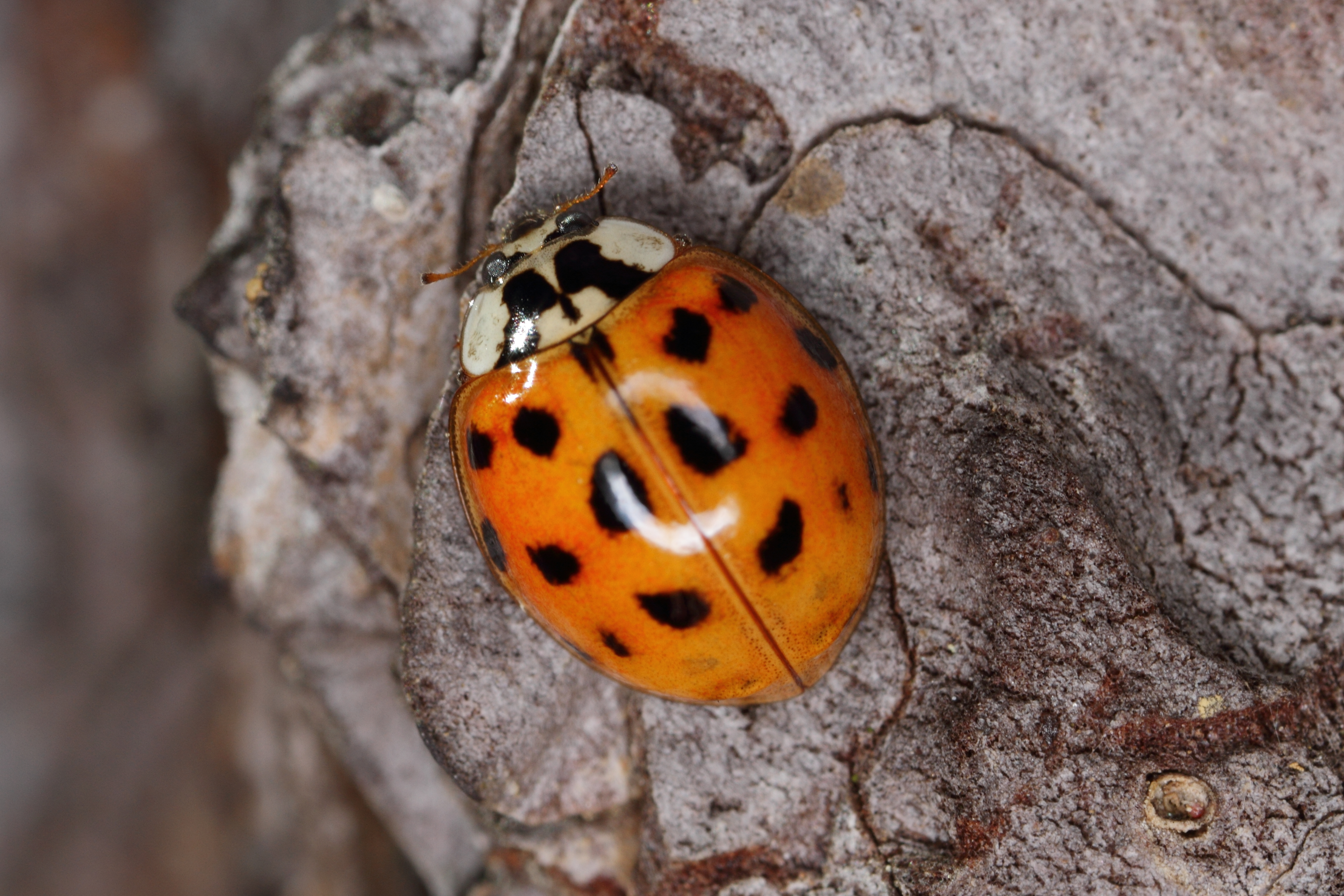
Asian lady beetle (Harmonia axyridis)

- Aedes albopictus (Asian tiger mosquito)
- Brachyponera chinensis (Asian needle ant)
- Cacyreus marshalli (Geranium bronze)
- Dryocosmus kuriphilus (Chestnut gall wasp)
- Drosophila suzukii (Spotted-wing drosophila)
- Harmonia axyridis (Asian lady beetle)
- Leptinotarsa decemlineata (Colorado beetle)
- Linepithema humile (Argentine ant)
- Ricania speculum (Black planthopper)
- Solenopsis invicta (Red imported fire ant)

=== Amphibians ===
- Lithobates catesbeianus (American Bullfrog)
- Xenopus laevis (African clawed frog)

=== Birds ===
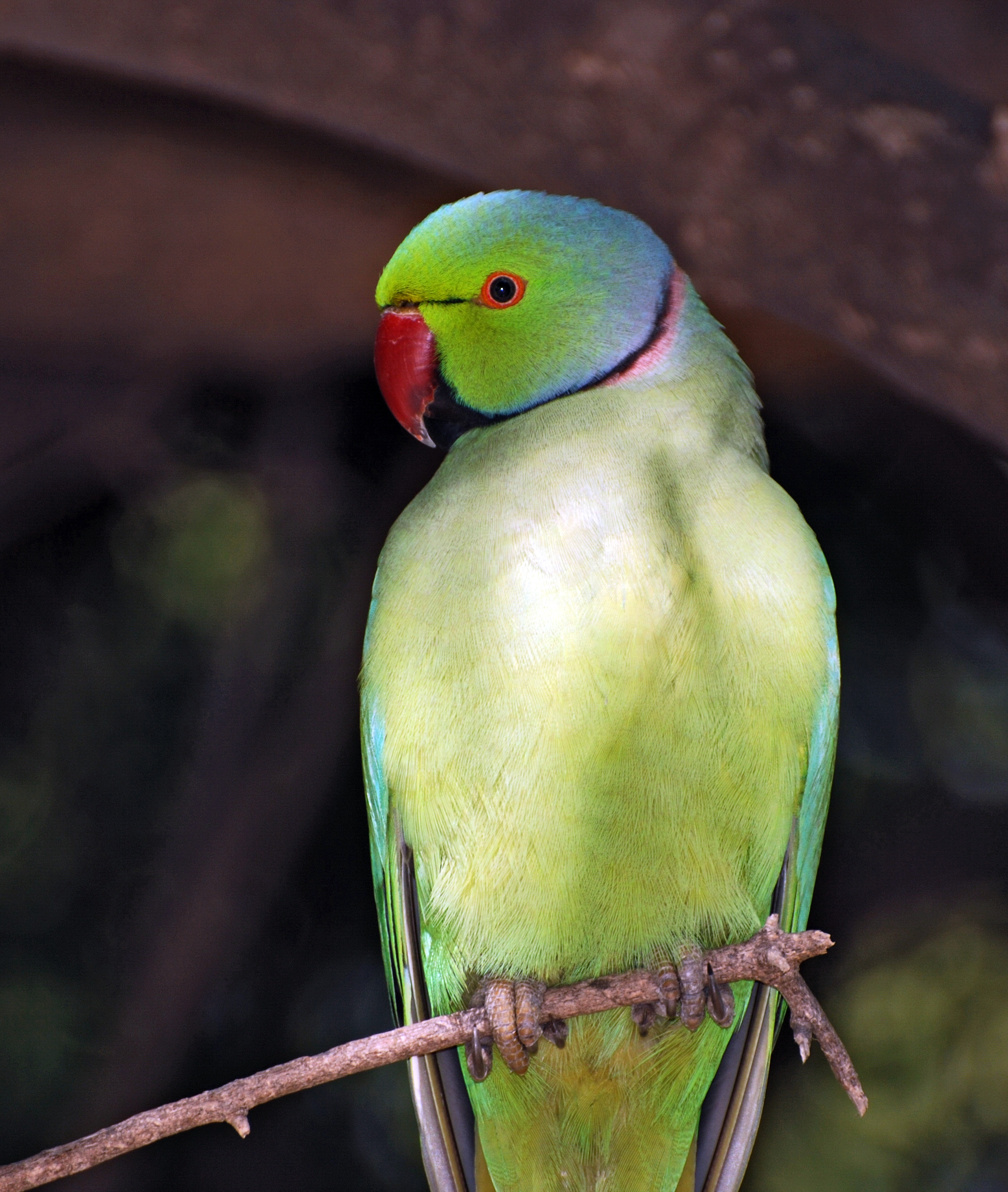
A male of Rose-ringed parakeet (Psittacula krameri) in India

- Alopochen aegyptiacus (Egyptian goose)
- Myiopsitta monachus (Monk parakeet)
- Psittacula krameri (Rose-ringed parakeet)

=== Fish ===
- Ameiurus melas (Black bullhead)
- Gambusia affinis (Eastern mosquitofish)
- Lepomis gibbosus (Pumpkinseed sunfish)
- Pseudorasbora parva (Stone moroko)
- Micropterus salmoides (Largemouth Bass)

=== Mammals ===
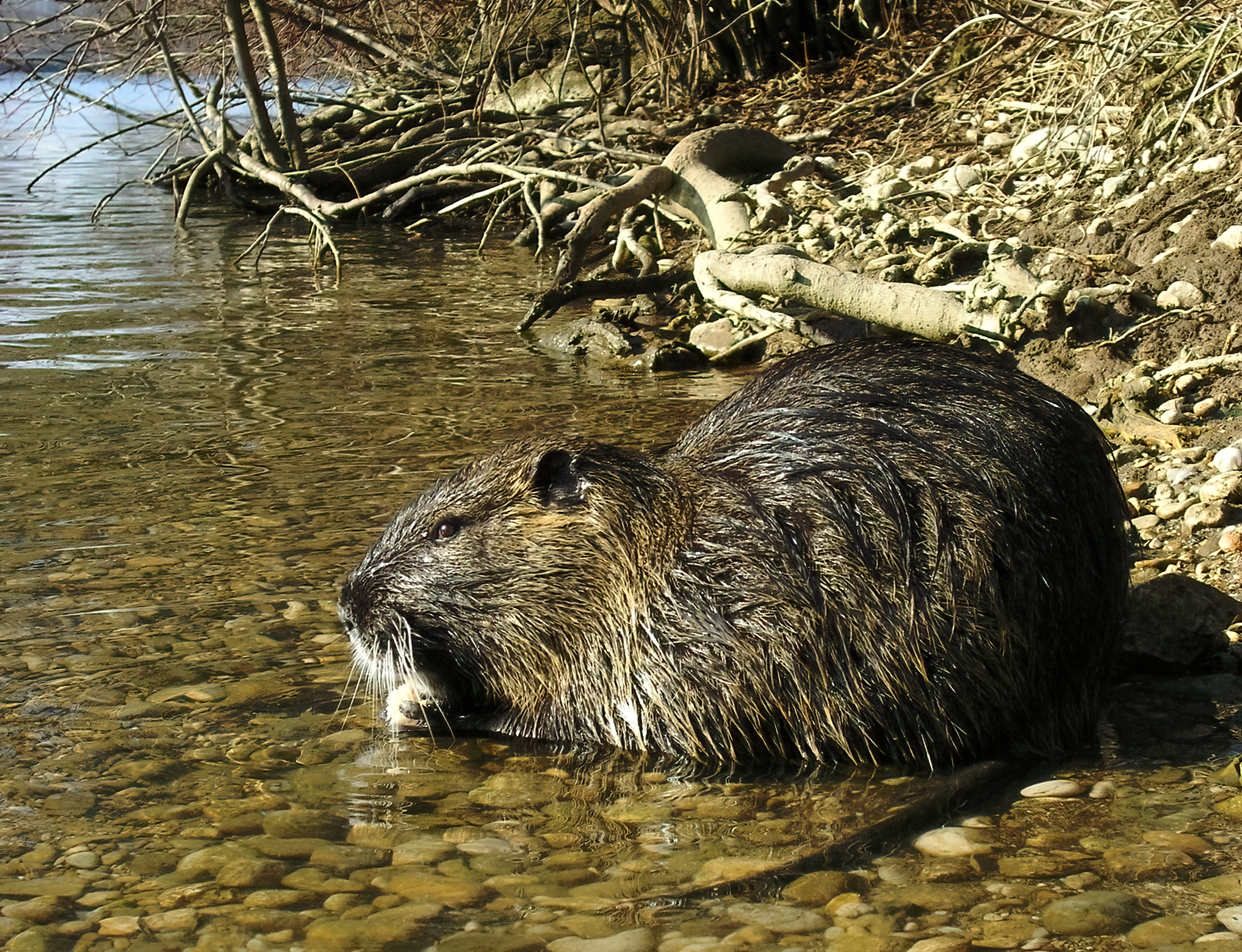
A coypu (Myocastor coypus)

- Eutamias sibiricus (Siberian chipmunk)
- Callosciurus finlaysonii (Finlayson's squirrel)
- Mustela vison (American mink)
- Myocastor coypus (Coypu, nutria)
- Nyctereutes procyonoides (Raccoon dog)
- Ondatra zibethicus (Muskrat)
- Rattus norvegicus (Brown rat)
- Rattus rattus (Black rat)
- Sciurus carolinensis (Grey squirrel)
- Procyon lotor (Common raccoon)

=== Reptiles ===
- Trachemys scripta elegans (Red-eared slider)
