= Invasive succulent plants in South Africa =

The following is a list of succulent invasive plants of South Africa as per the South African Ministry of Environment, Forestry and Fisheries.

== List ==
Botanical name	Common names	Locations	Notes
Agave americana	Spreading Century Plant		
Agave sisalana	Sisal hemp, Sisal		
Austrocylindropuntia cylindrica	Cane cactus		
Austrocylindropuntia subulata	Long spine cactus		
Bryophyllum delagoense	Chandelier plant		
Bryophyllum pinnatum	Cathedral bells		
Bryophyllum proliferum	Green mother of millions		
Cereus hexagonus	Queen of the night		
Cereus hildmannianus	Queen of the night		
Cereus jamacaru	Queen of the night		
Cylindropuntia fulgida	Chain-fruit cholla		
Cylindropuntia imbricata	Imbricate cactus, Imbricate prickly pear		
Cylindropuntia leptocaulis	Pencil cactus		
Cylindropuntia pallida	Pink flowered sheathed cholla		
Cylindropuntia spinosior	Cane cholla, Spiny cholla		
Echinopsis schickendantzii	Torch cactus		
Harrisia balansae	Strangler prickly apple	Little Karoo (biocontrolled by Hypogeococcus)	
Harrisia martinii	Moon cactus, Harrisia cactus	Prince Albert, Western Cape	
Harrisia pomanensis	Midnight lady, Devil’s rope cactus		
Harrisia tortuosa	Spiny snake cactus		
Selenicereus undatus/Hylocereus undatus	Night-blooming cereus, Dragon fruit, Pitahaya		
Myrtillocactus geometrizans	Bilberry cactus		
Opuntia aurantiaca	Jointed cactus		
Opuntia cespitosa	Indian fig	Prince Albert, Western Cape	
Opuntia elata	Orange tuna		
Opuntia engelmannii	Small round-leaved prickly pear		
Opuntia ficus-indica	Mission prickly pear, Sweet prickly pear		
Opuntia humifusa	Large flowered prickly pear, Creeping prickly pear		
Opuntia leucotricha	Aaron's-beard prickly-pear		
Opuntia microdasys	Yellow bunny-ears, Teddy- bear cactus		
Opuntia monacantha	Cochineal prickly pear, Drooping prickly pear		
Opuntia pubescens	Velvet bur cactus		
Opuntia robusta	Blue-leaf cactus		
Opuntia salmiana	Bur cactus		
Opuntia spinulifera	Saucepan cactus, Large roundleaved prickly pear		
Opuntia stricta	Pest pear of Australia		
Opuntia tomentosa	Velvet opuntia, Velvet tree pear		
Peniocereus serpentinus	Serpent cactus, Snake cactus		
Pereskia aculeata	Pereskia/Barbados gooseberry		
