= List of invasive plant species in Wisconsin =

This list of invasive plant species in Wisconsin includes non-native plant species or strains "that become established in natural plant communities and wild areas, replacing native vegetation".

The Invasive Plants Association of Wisconsin (IPAW) is a group working to address the problems presented by invasive species in Wisconsin. In Wisconsin it is illegal to "possess, transport, transfer, or introduce certain invasive species in Wisconsin without a permit".

Species on IPAW's list of invasive plants:

- Acer platanoides – Norway maple
- Alliaria petiolata – garlic mustard
- Arctium minus – common burdock
- Berberis thunbergii – Japanese barberry
- Bromus inermis – smooth brome
- Campanula rapunculoides – creeping bellflower
- Celastrus orbiculatus – Oriental bittersweet
- Centaurea maculosa – spotted knapweed
- Cirsium arvense – Canada thistle
- Convallaria majalis – lily of the valley
- Convolvulus arvensis – field bindweed
- Crepis tectorum – hawksbeard
- Daucus carota – Queen Anne's lace
- Dipsacus laciniatus – cut-leaved teasel
- Dipsacus sylvestris – common teasel
- Elaeagnus angustifolia – Russian olive
- Elaeagnus umbellata – autumn olive
- Elytrigia repens – quackgrass
- Epipactis helleborine – helleborine orchid
- Euphorbia cyparissias – cypress spurge
- Euphorbia esula – leafy spurge
- Festuca arundinacea – tall fescue
- Glechoma hederacea – creeping Charlie
- Hemerocallis fulva – orange daylily
- Hesperis matronalis – dame's rocket
- Hieracium aurantiacum – orange hawkweed
- Hieracium caespitosum – yellow hawkweed
- Hypericum perforatum – St. John's wort
- Iris pseudacorus – yellow iris
- Leonurus cardiaca – motherwort
- Lonicera maackii – Amur honeysuckle
- Lonicera morrowii – Morrow's honeysuckle
- Lonicera tatarica – Tartarian honeysuckle
- Lonicera × bella – Bell's honeysuckle
- Lotus corniculatus – bird's-foot trefoil
- Lysimachia nummularia – moneywort
- Lythrum salicaria – purple loosestrife
- Melilotus alba – white sweet clover
- Melilotus officinalis – yellow sweet clover
- Morus alba – white mulberry
- Myosotis scorpioides – forget-me-not
- Myriophyllum spicatum – Eurasian watermilfoil
- Pastinaca sativa – wild parsnip
- Phalaris arundinacea – reed canary grass
- Phragmites australis – common reed grass
- Pinus sylvestris – Scots pine
- Poa compressa – Canada bluegrass
- Poa pratensis – Kentucky bluegrass
- Populus alba – white poplar
- Potamogeton crispus – curly-leaf pondweed
- Reynoutria japonica (syn. Polygonum cuspidatum) – Japanese knotweed
- Rhamnus cathartica – common buckthorn
- Rhamnus frangula – glossy buckthorn
- Robinia pseudoacacia – black locust
- Rosa multiflora – multiflora rose
- Rumex acetosella – sheep sorrel
- Saponaria officinalis – soapwort
- Securigera varia – crown vetch
- Solanum dulcamara – climbing nightshade
- Tanacetum vulgare – tansy
- Trifolium pratense – red clover
- Trifolium repens – white clover
- Typha angustifolia – narrow-leaved cattail
- Typha × glauca – hybrid cattail
- Ulmus pumila – Siberian elm
- Vinca minor – common periwinkle
