= Invasive species in Guam =

As with a number of other geographically isolated islands, Guam has problems with invasive species negatively affecting the natural biodiversity of the island.

== Brown tree snake ==
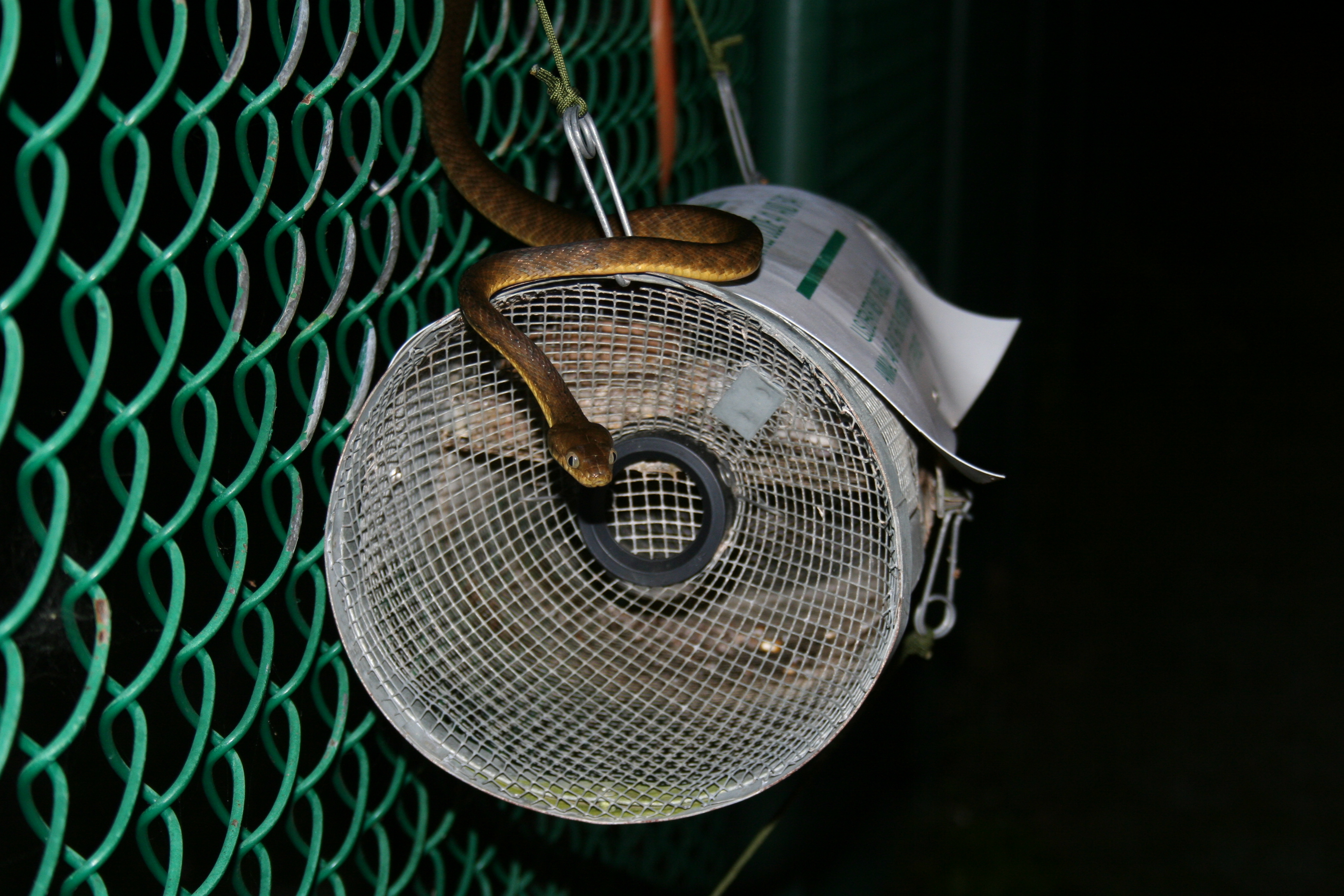
A brown tree snake near a snake trap hanging from a fence on Guam

Believed to be a stowaway on a U.S. military transport after the end of World War II, the brown tree snake (Boiga irregularis) was accidentally introduced to Guam, which previously had no native species of snake. It nearly eliminated the native bird population. The problem was exacerbated because the snake has no natural predators on the island. The brown tree snake, known locally as the kulebla, is native to northern and eastern coasts of Australia, Papua New Guinea, and the Solomon Islands. It is slightly venomous, but relatively harmless to human beings; it is nocturnal. Although some studies have suggested a high density of these serpents on Guam, residents rarely see them. The United States Department of Agriculture has trained detector dogs to keep the snakes out of the island's cargo flow. The United States Geological Survey also has dogs that can detect snakes in forested environments around the region's islands.

=== Threat to native birds ===
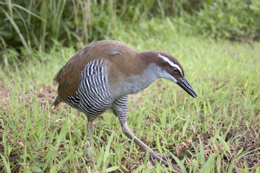
The Guam rail now exists only in captivity

Before the introduction of the brown tree snake, Guam was home to 14 species of terrestrial birds. Two of these fourteen birds are endemic to Guam at the species level: The Guam flycatcher, also called the Guam broadbill, and the Guam rail are not naturally found anywhere else in the world. The Guam flycatcher, was last seen in 1985 and is now believed to be extinct. The Guam rail (or ko'ko' bird in Chamorro), a flightless bird, extinct in the wild, has been successfully bred in captivity. An experimental population of Guam rails has been released on Rota, an island forty miles north of Guam in the Northern Mariana Islands. The loss of these birds is believed to be largely a result of habitat alteration and the effects of the introduced brown tree snake. The devastation caused by the snake has been significant over the past several decades. As many as twelve bird species are believed to have been driven to extinction. However, some of the birds still thrive and are common on other islands at the subspecies level in the Marianas, including Saipan. According to many elders, ko'ko' birds were common in Guam before World War II.

Other bird species threatened by the brown tree snake include the Mariana crow, the Mariana swiftlet, and the yellow bittern, which are still present on the island, though populations are present on other islands in the Marianas.

Guam is said to have many more insects and 40 times more spiders than neighboring islands, because bird populations are severely diminished, and the forests are almost completely silent due to lack of birdsong.

== Coconut rhinoceros beetle ==
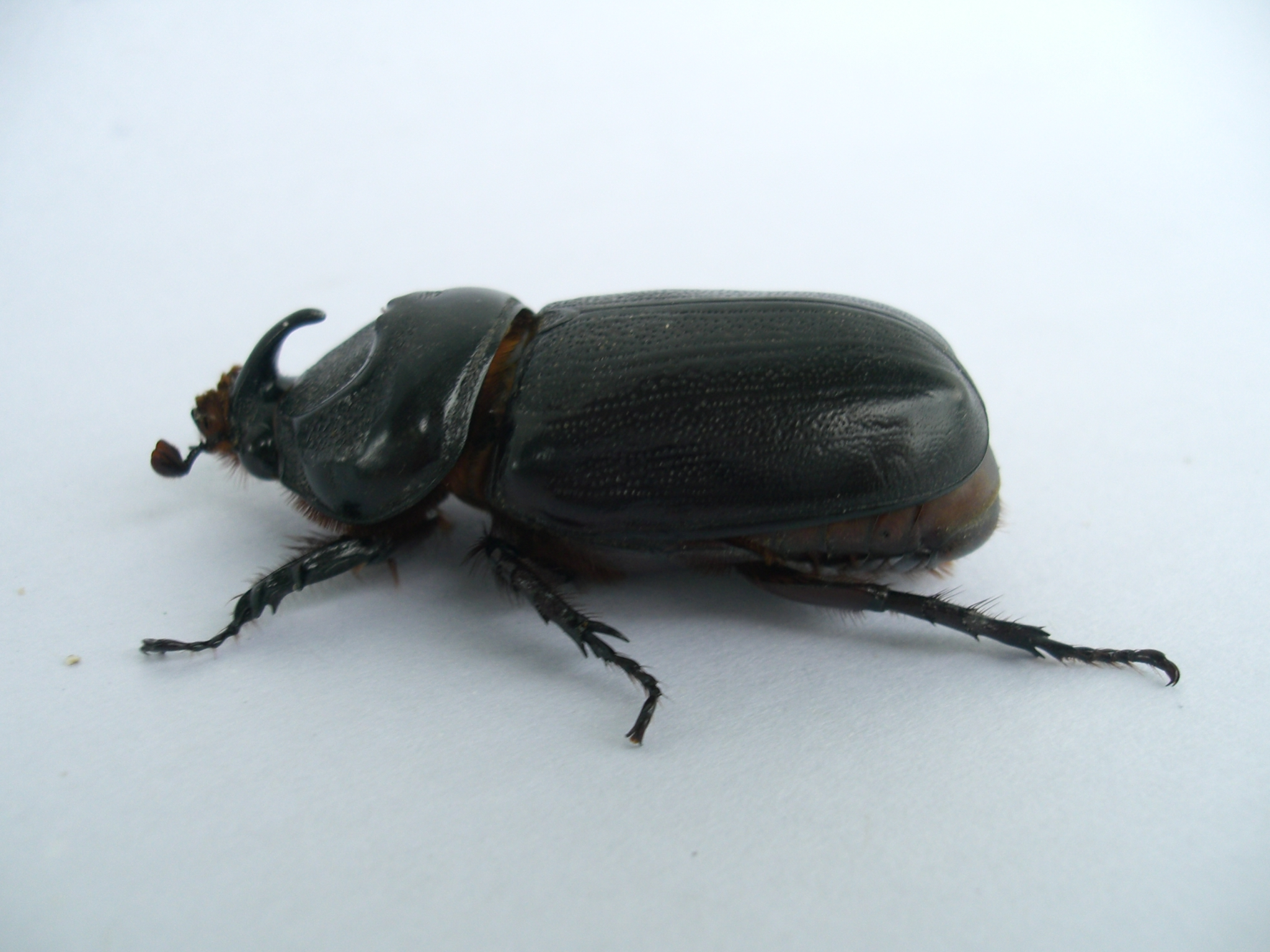
Coconut rhinoceros beetle

An infestation of the coconut rhinoceros beetle (CRB), Oryctes rhinoceros, was detected on Guam on September 12, 2007. CRB is not known to occur in the United States except in American Samoa. Delimiting surveys performed September 13–25, 2007, indicated that the infestation was limited to Tumon Bay and Faifai Beach, an area of approximately 900 acres (3.6 km^{2}). Guam Department of Agriculture (GDA) placed quarantine on all properties within the Tumon area on October 5 and later expanded the quarantine to about 2,500 acres (10 km^{2}) on October 25; approximately 0.5 miles (800 m) radius in all directions from all known locations of CRB infestation. CRB is native to Southern Asia and distributed throughout Asia and the Western Pacific including Sri Lanka, Upolu, Samoa, American Samoa, Palau, New Britain, West Irian, New Ireland, Pak Island and Manus Island (New Guinea), Fiji, Cocos (Keeling) Islands, Mauritius, and Reunion.

== Other invasive animal species ==
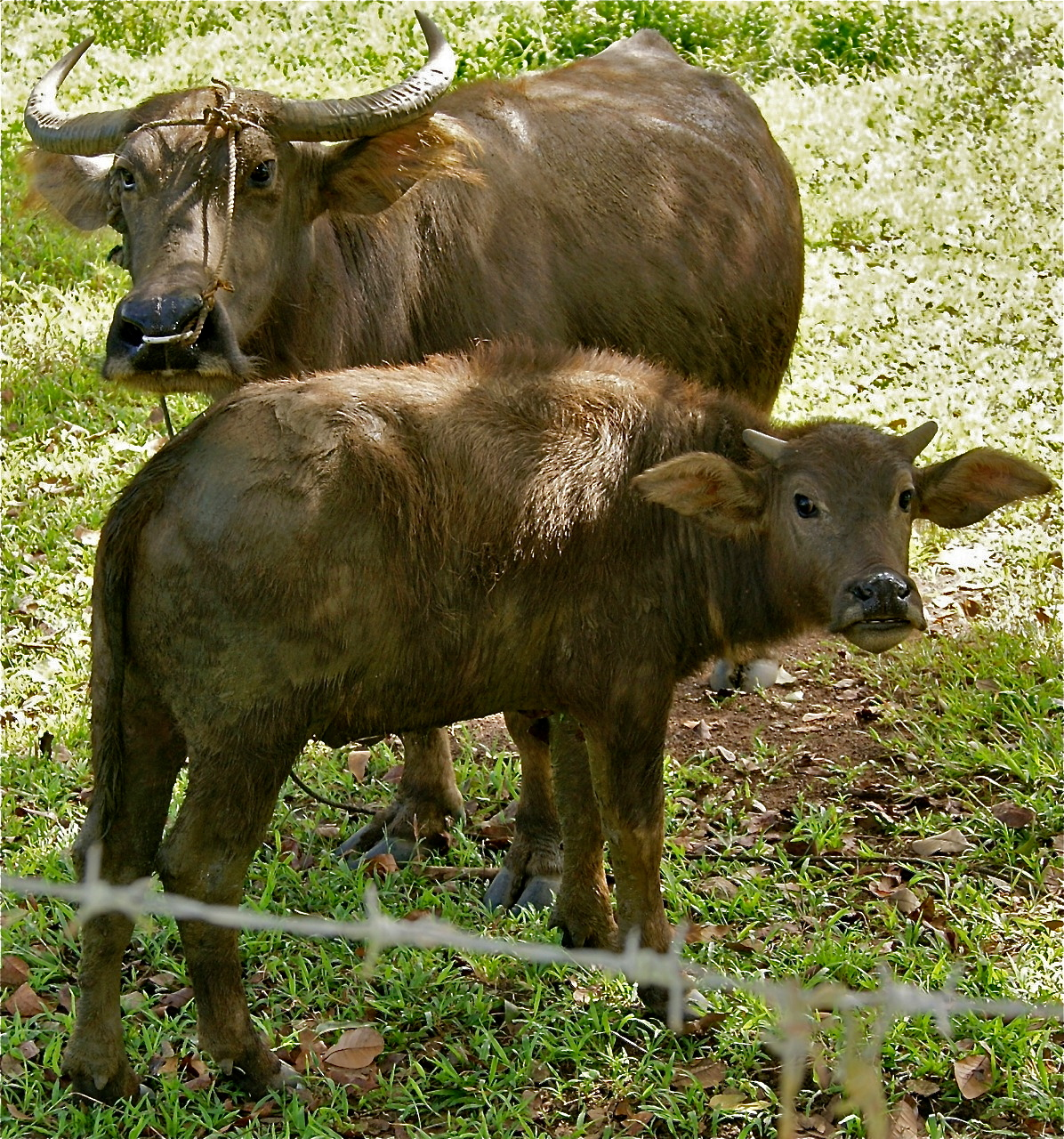
Adult female carabao and calf

From the seventeenth through nineteenth centuries, the Spanish introduced the Philippine deer (Rusa mariannus), black francolins, and carabao (a subspecies of water buffalo), which have cultural significance. Herds of carabao obstruct military base operations and harm native ecosystems. After birth control and adoption efforts were ineffective, the U.S. military began culling the herds in 2002 leading to organized protests from island residents. Other introduced species include the giant African snail (an agricultural pest introduced during World War II by Japanese occupation troops).

Guam has no native amphibian species, but now a total of nine amphibian species have been established in Guam. Litoria fallax (native to the eastern coast of Australia) has been present in Guam since 1968, and Rhinella marina (the cane toad) was brought to the island in 1937. The other 7 amphibian species, namely Sylvirana guentheri (native to mainland Asia), Microhyla pulchra (native to mainland Asia), Polypedates braueri (endemic to Taiwan), Eleutherodactylus planirostris (native to the Caribbean), Fejervarya cancrivora (the Guam variety being most closely related to F. cancrivora found in Taiwan), Fejervarya limnocharis (native to Southeast Asia), have been in Guam since 2003 and the Eleutherodactylus coqui also commonly known as the coquí frog native to Puerto Rico that may have arrived from Hawaii, have led to fears that the noise could threaten Guam's tourism. Many species were likely inadvertently introduced via shipping cargo, especially from Taiwan, mainland China, and Southeast Asia.

Introduced feral animals such as pigs and deer, over-hunting, and habitat loss from human development are also major factors in the decline and loss of Guam's native plants and animals.

Feral chickens (Gallus gallus domesticus) are found in the forests although they are not significantly integrated into the food webs in most areas.

== Threats to indigenous plants ==
Invading animal species are not the only threat to Guam's native flora. Tinangaja, a virus affecting coconut palms, was first observed on the island in 1917 when copra production was still a major part of Guam's economy. Though coconut plantations no longer exist on the island, the dead and infected trees that have resulted from the epidemic are seen throughout the forests of Guam.

During the past century, the dense forests of northern Guam have been largely replaced by thick tangan-tangan brush (Leucaena leucocephala). Much of Guam's foliage was lost during World War II. In 1947, the U.S. military is thought to have planted tangan-tangan by seeding the island from the air to prevent erosion. Tangan-tangan was present on the island before 1905.

In southern Guam, non-native grass species dominate much of the landscape. Although the colorful and impressive flame tree (Delonix regia) is found throughout the Marianas, the tree on Guam has been largely decimated.

The Coconut rhinoceros beetle (CRB) infestation has become an epidemic event of palm tree damage on Guam. The CRB infects palm trees by burrowing into the tips of the palms, effectively killing the plant by destroying the shoot apical meristem during the process. While the grubs and larvae of CRB do no actual harm to palms, they populate and grow within the damaged crowns of the palm trees, which is a specific mating habit of Guam CRBs.

A possible solution to the crisis, which has been ecologically analyzed in Western Samoa, would be the introduction of CRB predators. Centipedes, Scolopendra Morsitans, have been found to seek out and eat the larvae of the beetle in logs and other breeding grounds. Manual insertion of the centipedes, or introduction of volatile attractors within the plant, may cause a significant dent in Guam's CRB mortality. The introduction of terpene, fatty acids, or other nitrogenous compound metabolites may allow palm trees to attract CRB-predators such as the centipede through an indirect defense response, which is triggered by mechanoreceptors activating secondary metabolite transcribers via an action potential pathway.

A secondary solution could be introducing metal hyperaccumulation into the palm population on Guam's beaches. Plants that accumulate extra inorganic minerals, such as iron, nickel, or zinc, indirectly deter herbivory by depositing excess materials in certain sections of the plants. While the excess inorganic materials may not directly affect adult CRBs (as minerals would not be deposited in the meristem sections of the plant), it may create an inhospitable and toxic environment for the immature CRBs that are growing in the trees.
