= List of invasive species in Ukraine =

The list of species in Ukraine consists of invasive species. Invasive species in Ukraine are a significant threat to many native habitats and species and a significant cost to agriculture, forestry, and recreation. The term "invasive species" can refer to introduced/naturalized species, feral species, or introduced diseases. Some introduced species do not cause significant economic or ecologic damage and are not widely considered as invasive.

== Invasive insect species in Ukraine ==
- Box tree moth
- Colorado potato beetle
- Fall webworm
- Asian ladybeetle
- Horse-chestnut leaf miner
- Russian pig-flies
- Megachile sculpturalis

== Invasive fish species in Ukraine ==
- Chinese sleeper
- Largemouth bass
- Prussian carp
- Pumpkinseed
- Topmouth gudgeon

== Invasive plant species in Ukraine ==
- Amur cork tree
- Canada goldenrod
- Canadian waterweed
- Common milkweed
- Common ragweed
- Common tumbleweed
- Creeping speedwell
- Curlycup gumweed
- Daisy fleabane
- Diffuse knapweed
- Echinocystis lobata
- False acacia
- False indigo-bush
- Gallant soldier
- Giant hogweed
- Giant knotweed
- Giant sumpweed
- Himalayan balsam
- Horseweed
- Jerusalem artichoke
- Large-flowered evening-primrose
- Large-leaved lupine
- Manitoba maple
- Northern red oak
- Pilewort
- Powell's amaranth
- Prostrate pigweed
- Redroot pigweed
- Shrubby hare's-ear
- Silver berry
- Small balsam
- Sosnowsky's hogweed
- Sticktights
- Tall hedge mustard
- Turkish wartycabbage
- Virginia creeper

== Other invasive animal species in Ukraine ==
- American mink
- New Zealand mud snail
- Peach blossom jellyfish
- Quagga mussel
- Raccoon dog
- Spanish slug
- Veined rapa whelk
- Warty comb jelly
- Zebra mussel
