= List of invasive plant species in Connecticut =

Scientists at the University of Connecticut together with principals at the Connecticut Department of Energy and Environmental Protection (DEEP) have identified numerous plant species that pose a threat to habitats, human health and economy. The list below is a partial inventory of non-native species that are considered to be an existing threat or potential threat.

== Terrestrial Plant Threats ==
Picture	Scientific Name	Common Name
	Acer platanoides	Norway maple
	Ailanthus altissima	tree of heaven
	Alliaria petiolata	garlic mustard
	Ampelopsis glandulosa	porcelain berry
	Aralia elata	Japanese angelica tree
	Berberis thunbergii	Japanese barberry
	Celastrus orbiculatus	Oriental bittersweet
	Centaurea maculosa	spotted knapweed
	Cirsium arvense	Canada thistle
	Egeria densa	large-flowered waterweed
	Euonymus alatus	winged spindle, burning bush
	Euphorbia esula	green spurge
	Ligustrum vulgare	European privet
	Lonicera maackii	Amur honeysuckle
	Lythrum salicaria	purple loosestrife
	Microstegium vimineum	Japanese stiltgrass
	Miscanthus sinensis	maiden silvergrass
	Ranunculus ficaria	lesser celandine
	Reynoutria japonica	Asian knotweed
	Rhodotypos scandens	jetbead
	Rosa multiflora	multiflora rose
	Rubus phoenicolasius	Japanese wineberry

== See also ==
- Invasive species in the United States
