= List of invasive plant species in Massachusetts =

Numerous non-native plants have been introduced to Massachusetts in the United States and many of them have become invasive species. The Massachusetts Invasive Plant Advisory Group (MIPAG) is a voluntary collaborative that was established in 1995 to advise the Commonwealth of Massachusetts on invasive plant species. They have categorized invasive plants as "invasive," "likely invasive," and "potentially invasive." The following is a list of non-native invasive plant species established in Massachusetts.

== Invasive ==
An invasive plant in Massachusetts is a non-native species (including its subspecies, varieties, forms, synonyms, and cultivars) that establishes self-sustaining populations in native or minimally managed systems and causes ecological or economic harm by becoming dominant or disruptive.

Image	Scientific name	Common name
	Acer platanoides	Norway maple
	Acer pseudoplatanus	Sycamore maple
	Aegopodium podagraria	Ground elder; goutweed
	Ailanthus altissima	Tree-of-heaven
	Alliaria petiolata	Garlic mustard
	Alnus glutinosa	European alder; black alder
	Berberis thunbergii	Japanese barberry
	Cabomba caroliniana	Carolina fanwort
	Celastrus orbiculatus	Oriental bittersweet
	Vincetoxicum nigrum	Black swallow-wort
	Elaeagnus umbellata	Autumn olive
	Eragrostis curvula	Weeping lovegrass
	Euonymus alatus	Winged euonymus; burning bush
	Euphorbia esula	Leafy spurge
	Fallopia japonica	Japanese knotweed
	Ficaria verna	Lesser celandine
	Frangula alnus	Glossy buckthorn
	Glaucium flavum	Sea poppy
	Hesperis matronalis	Dame's rocket
	Iris pseudacorus	Yellow iris
	Lepidium latifolium	Broad-leaved pepperweed
	Lonicera japonica	Japanese honeysuckle
	Lonicera morrowii	Morrow's honeysuckle
	Lonicera x bella	Bell's honeysuckle
	Lysimachia nummularia	Creeping jenny
	Lythrum salicaria	Purple loosestrife
	Myriophyllum heterophyllum	Variable water-milfoil
	Myriophyllum spicatum	European water-milfoil
	Phalaris arundinacea	Reed canary-grass
	Phragmites australis	Common reed
	Polygonum perfoliata	Mile-a-minute vine
	Potamogeton crispus	Curly-leaved pondweed
	Rhamnus cathartica	Common buckthorn
	Robinia pseudoacacia	Black locust
	Rosa multiflora	Multiflora rose
	Salix atrocinerea	Large gray willow
	Salix cinerea	Rusty willow
	Trapa natans	Water-chestnut

== Likely invasive ==
A likely invasive plant in Massachusetts is a non-native species that has become naturalized but does not fully meet the criteria for designation as invasive.

Image	Scientific name	Common name
	Actinidia arguta	Hardy kiwi
	Ampelopsis glandulosa	Porcelain-berry
	Anthriscus sylvestris	Wild chervil
	Berberis vulgaris	European barberry
	Butomus umbellatus	Flowering rush
	Cardamine impatiens	Narrowleaf bittercress
	Centaurea stoebe	Spotted knapweed
	Vincetoxicum rossicum	European swallow-wort
	Cytisus scoparius	Scotch broom
	Elodea densa	Brazilian waterweed
	Epilobium hirsutum	Hairy willow-herb
	Euphorbia cyparissias	Cypress spurge
	Festuca filiformis	Hair fescue
	Glyceria maxima	Tall mannagrass
	Heracleum mantegazzianum	Giant hogweed
	Humulus japonicus	Japanese hops
	Hydrilla verticillata	Hydrilla
	Jacobaea vulgaris	Tansy ragwort
	Lactuca muralis	Wall lettuce
	Ligustrum obtusifolium	Border privet
	Lonicera tatarica	Tatarian honeysuckle
	Microstegium vimineum	Japanese stilt grass
	Miscanthus sacchariflorus	Plume grass
	Myosotis scorpioides	Forget-me-not
	Myriophyllum aquaticum	Parrot-feather
	Najas minor	Brittle water-nymph
	Nymphoides peltata	Yellow floating heart
	Phellodendron amurense	Amur cork-tree
	Pinus thunbergii	Japanese black pine
	Pueraria montana	Kudzu
	Pyrus calleryana	Callery pear; Bradford pear
	Ranunculus repens	Creeping buttercup
	Rhodotypos scandens	Jetbead
	Rorippa amphibia	Water yellowcress
	Rubus phoenicolasius	Wineberry
	Tussilago farfara	Coltsfoot

== Potentially invasive ==
A potentially invasive plant in Massachusetts is a non-native species which has not yet naturalized in the state, but is expected to become invasive in minimally managed habitats.

Image	Scientific name	Common name
	Arthraxon hispidus	Hairy joint grass
	Carex kobomugi	Japanese sedge
	Lonicera maackii	Amur honeysuckle
