= List of invasive aquatic species in Montana =

Montana, USA, has a wide variety of invasive aquatic species ranging from algae to turtles. The effect each invasive species has on the environment varies greatly, some species are devastating while others are negligible. Aquatic plants and algae may easily be transported from lake to lake by boaters who do not take the necessary precautions when launching their boats into new bodies of water. Sometimes, pet owners release their pets into a non-native habitat where they will actually thrive and eventually establish a population and then begin to displace the native species that it competes with.

== Algae ==
Media	Family	Scientific name	Common name	Origin
	Gomphonemataceae	Didymosphenia geminata	Didymo	Cryptogenic

== Amphibians ==
Media	Family	Scientific name	Common name	Origin
	Ranidae	Lithobates catesbeianus	American bullfrog	Native transplant
	Hylidae	Pseudacris regilla	Northern Pacific tree frog	Native transplant

== Fish ==
Media	Family	Scientific Name	Common name	Origin
	Centrarchidae	Ambloplites rupestris	Rock bass	Native transplant
	Ictaluridae	Ameiurus melas	Black bullhead	Native transplant
	Ictaluridae	Ameiurus natalis	Yellow bullhead	Native transplant
	Cyprinidae	Carassius auratus	Goldfish	Exotic
	Catostomidae	Catostomus ardens	Utah sucker	Native transplant
	Catostomidae	Catostomus commersonii	White sucker	Native transplant
	Salmonidae	Coregonus artedi	Cisco	Native transplant
	Salmonidae	Coregonus clupeaformis	Lake whitefish	Native transplant
	Cyprinidae	Couesius plumbeus	Lake chub	Native transplant
	Gasterosteidae	Culaea inconstans	Brook stickleback	Native transplant
	Cyprinidae	Cyprinus carpio	Common carp	Exotic
	Esocidae	Esox lucius	Northern pike	Native transplant
	Esocidae	Esox lucius × masquinongy	Tiger muskellunge	Native hybrid
	Fundulidae	Fundulus kansae	Northern Plains killifish	Native transplant
	Fundulidae	Fundulus zebrinus	Plains killifish	Native transplant
	Poeciliidae	Gambusia affinis	Western mosquitofish	Native transplant
	Cyprinidae	Gila atraria	Utah chub	Native transplant
	Ictaluridae	Ictalurus punctatus	Channel catfish	Native transplant
	Centrarchidae	Lepomis cyanellus	Green sunfish	Native transplant
	Centrarchidae	Lepomis gibbosus	Pumpkinseed	Native transplant
	Centrarchidae	Lepomis macrochirus	Bluegill	Native transplant
	Centrarchidae	Micropterus dolomieu	Smallmouth bass	Native transplant
	Centrarchidae	Micropterus salmoides	Largemouth bass	Native transplant
	Moronidae	Morone chrysops	White bass	Native transplant
	Cyprinidae	Notemigonus crysoleucas	Golden shiner	Native transplant
	Cyprinidae	Notropis hudsonius	Spottail shiner	Native transplant
	Salmonidae	Oncorhynchus aguabonita	Golden trout	Native transplant
	Salmonidae	Oncorhynchus clarkii bouvieri	Yellowstone cutthroat trout	Native transplant
	Salmonidae	Oncorhynchus clarkii lewisi	Westslope cutthroat trout	Native transplant
	Salmonidae	Oncorhynchus clarkii × mykiss	Cutbow trout	Native hybrid
	Salmonidae	Oncorhynchus kisutch	Coho salmon	Native transplant
	Salmonidae	Oncorhynchus mykiss	Rainbow trout	Native transplant
	Salmonidae	Oncorhynchus mykiss ssp.	Redband trout	Native transplant
	Salmonidae	Oncorhynchus nerka	Sockeye salmon	Native transplant
	Salmonidae	Oncorhynchus tshawytscha	Chinook salmon	Native transplant
	Cichlidae	Oreochromis mossambicus	Mozambique tilapia	Exotic
	Osmeridae	Osmerus mordax	Rainbow smelt	Native transplant
	Percidae	Perca flavescens	Yellow perch	Native transplant
	Characidae	Piaractus brachypomus	Pirapitinga, red-bellied pacu	Exotic
	Cyprinidae	Pimephales promelas	Fathead minnow	Native transplant
	Poeciliidae	Poecilia latipinna	Sailfin molly	Native transplant
	Poeciliidae	Poecilia mexicana	Shortfin molly	Exotic
	Poeciliidae	Poecilia reticulata	Guppy	Exotic
	Poeciliidae	Poecilia sphenops	Mexican molly	Exotic
	Centrarchidae	Pomoxis annularis	White crappie	Native transplant
	Centrarchidae	Pomoxis nigromaculatus	Black crappie	Native transplant
	Cyprinidae	Richardsonius balteatus	Redside shiner	Exotic
	Salmonidae	Salmo letnica	Ohrid trout	Exotic
	Salmonidae	Salmo salar sebago	Atlantic salmon	Native transplant
	Salmonidae	Salmo trutta	Brown trout	Exotic
	Salmonidae	Salmo trutta × Salvelinus fontinalis	Tiger trout	Exotic hybrid
	Salmonidae	Salvelinus fontinalis	Brook trout	Native transplant
	Salmonidae	Salvelinus namaycush	Lake trout	Native transplant
	Percidae	Sander canadensis × vitreus	Saugeye	Native hybrid
	Percidae	Sander vitreus	Walleye	Native transplant
	Salmonidae	Thymallus arcticus	Arctic grayling	Native transplant
	Umbridae	Umbra limi	Central mudminnow	Native transplant
	Poeciliidae	Xiphophorus hellerii	Green swordtail	Exotic
	Poeciliidae	Xiphophorus maculatus	Southern platyfish	Exotic
	Poeciliidae	Xiphophorus variatus	Variable platyfish	Exotic

== Aquatic mammals ==
Media	Family	Scientific name	Common name	Origin
	Myocastoridae	Myocastor coypus	Nutria	Exotic

== Mollusks ==
Media	Family	Scientific name	Common name	Origin
	Cyrenidae	Corbicula fluminea	Asian clam	Exotic
	Dreissenidae	Dreissena sp.	Zebra muscle	Exotic
	Bithyniidae	Bithynia tentaculata	Mud bithynia, faucet snail	Exotic
	Thiaridae	Melanoides tuberculata	Red-rim melania	Exotic
	Physidae	Physella acuta	Acute bladder snail	Native transplant
	Hydrobiidae	Potamopyrgus antipodarum	New Zealand mudsnail	Exotic
	Lymnaeidae	Radix auricularia	European ear snail	Exotic

== Aquatic plants ==
Media	Family	Scientific name	Common name	Origin
	Poaceae	Alopecurus geniculatus	Water foxtail	Exotic
	Butomaceae	Butomus umbellatus	Flowering rush	Exotic
	Plantaginaceae	Callitriche stagnalis	Pond water-starwort	Exotic
	Iridaceae	Iris pseudacorus	Yellow iris	Exotic
	Juncaceae	Juncus compressus	Roundfruit rush	Exotic
	Juncaceae	Juncus gerardii	Saltmeadow rush	Native transplant
	Lythraceae	Lythrum salicaria	Purple loosestrife	Exotic
	Boraginaceae	Myosotis scorpioides	Forget-me-not	Exotic
	Haloragaceae	Myriophyllum aquaticum	Parrot feather	Exotic
	Haloragaceae	Myriophyllum spicatum	Eurasian watermilfoil	Exotic
	Hydrocharitaceae	Najas marina	Holly-leaf waternymph	Native transplant
	Brassicaceae	Nasturtium officinale	water-cress	Exotic
	Nymphaeaceae	Nymphaea odorata	American white waterlily	Native transplant
	Poaceae	Phalaris arundinacea	Reed canarygrass	Exotic
	Potamogetonaceae	Potamogeton crispus	Curly-leaf pondweed	Exotic
	Brassicaceae	Rorippa sylvestris	Keek	Exotic
	Tamaricaceae	Tamarix	Tamarisk	Exotic
	Typhaceae	Typha angustifolia	Narrow-leaved cattail	Exotic
	Hydrocharitaceae	Vallisneria americana	Wild-celery	Native transplant

== Reptiles ==
Media	Family	Scientific name	Common name	Origin
	Chelydridae	Chelydra serpentina	Snapping turtle	Native transplant

== Crustaceans ==
Media	Family	Scientific name	Common name	Origin
	Gammaridae	Gammarus sp.	Amphipod	Native transplant
	Cambaridae	Faxonius virilis	Virile crayfish, northern crayfish	Native transplant
	Mysidae	Mysis diluviana	Opossum shrimp	Native transplant
