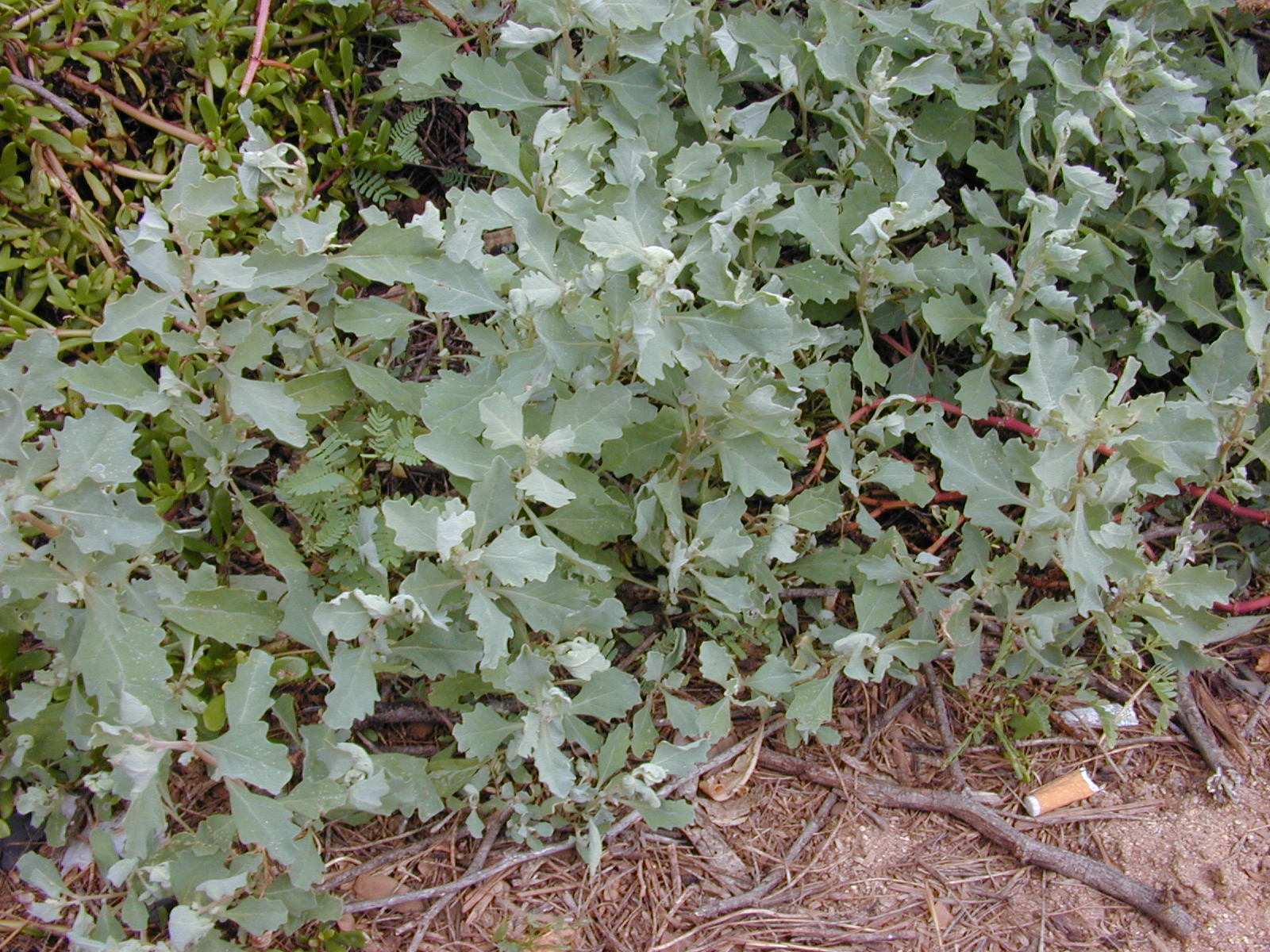

Scientific classification
- Kingdom: Plantae
- Clade: Tracheophytes
- Clade: Angiosperms
- Clade: Eudicots
- Order: Caryophyllales
- Family: Amaranthaceae
- Genus: Atriplex
- Species: A. suberecta

Binomial name
- Atriplex suberecta I.Verd.

= Atriplex suberecta =

Species of plant

Atriplex suberecta is a species of saltbush known by the common names sprawling saltbush, lagoon saltbush and (in Britain and Ireland) Australian orache. It is native to Australia.

== Distribution ==
It can be found on other continents as an introduced species and invasive species, including southern Africa and parts of North America. It is sometimes considered a noxious weed.

== Description ==
This is an annual herb producing sprawling, scaly stems 20 to 60 centimeters long. The thin, toothed leaves are oval to diamond-shaped and up to 3 centimeters long. The male and female flowers are generally borne in axillary clusters.
