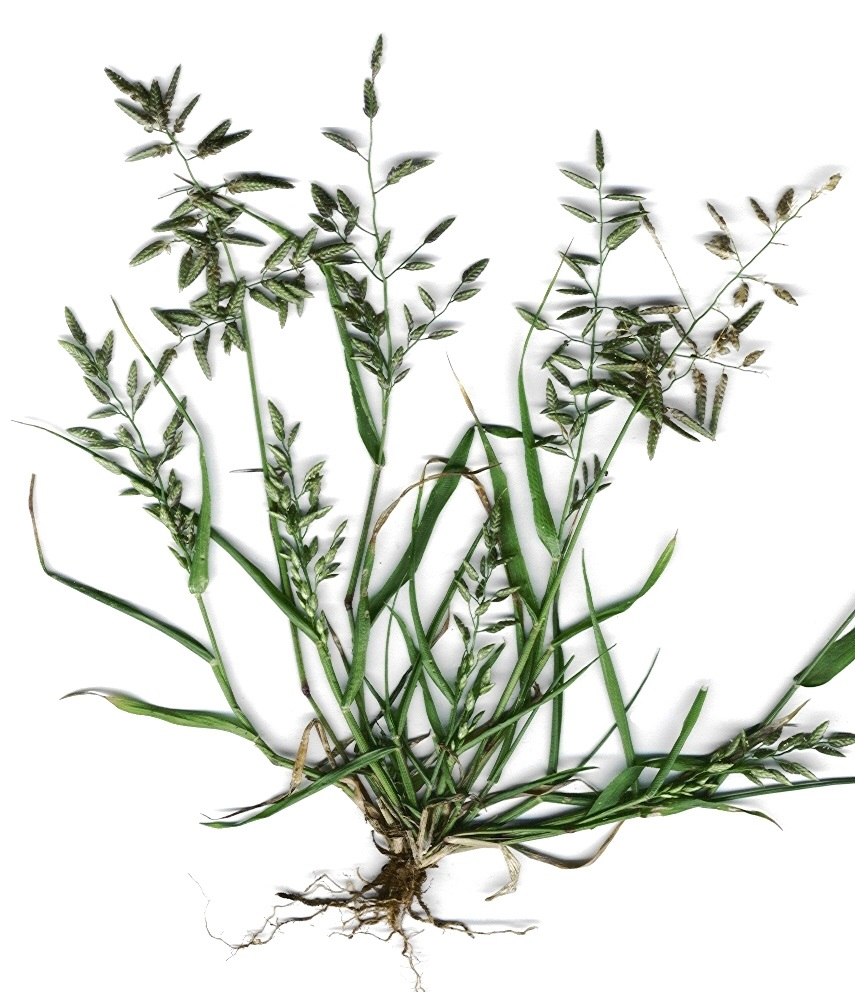

Scientific classification
- Kingdom: Plantae
- Clade: Tracheophytes
- Clade: Angiosperms
- Clade: Monocots
- Clade: Commelinids
- Order: Poales
- Family: Poaceae
- Subfamily: Chloridoideae
- Genus: Eragrostis
- Species: E. cilianensis

Binomial name
- Eragrostis cilianensis (All.) Vign. ex Janchen

Synonyms
- Eragrostis major Eragrostis megastachya Poa cilianensis

= Eragrostis cilianensis =

Gray lovegrass

Species of grass

Eragrostis cilianensis is a species of grass known by several common names, including stinkgrass, candy grass, and gray lovegrass.

== Distribution ==
This plant is native to much of Eurasia and Africa but it is widely naturalized elsewhere, including nearly all of North America.

== Description ==
This is an annual bunchgrass forming tufts up to about half a meter in height. The stems are generally erect but may droop or bend. The stems have glandular tissue near the nodes and the long leaves are often dotted with glands as well. The plants have a strong scent.

The branching inflorescences have one to several spikelets per branch. Each spikelet is greenish brown, sometimes very slightly purple-tinted, and one half to two centimeters long. It is somewhat flattened and lined with 10 to over 40 florets.
