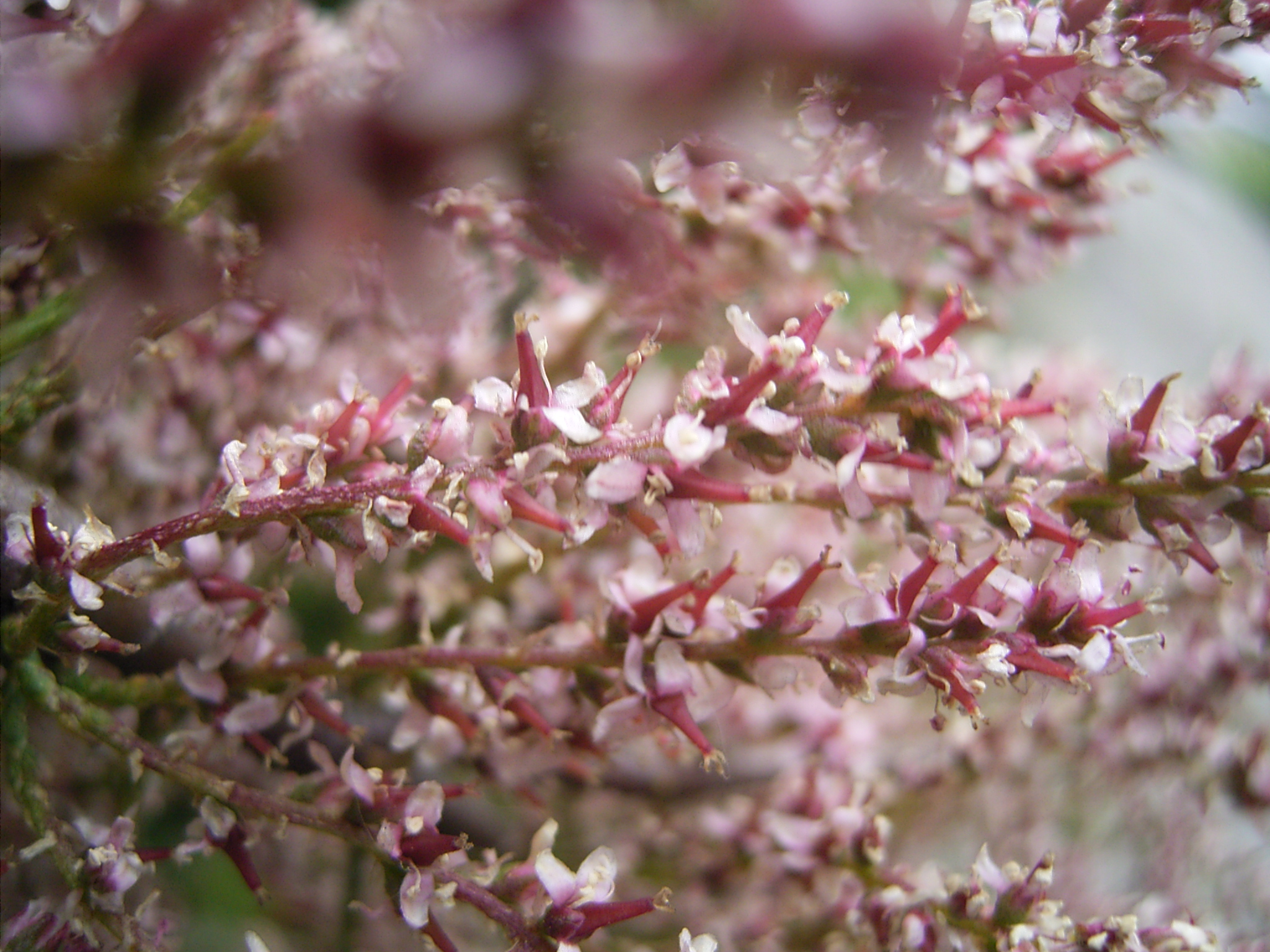

Conservation status
- Least Concern (IUCN 3.1)

Scientific classification
- Kingdom: Plantae
- Clade: Tracheophytes
- Clade: Angiosperms
- Clade: Eudicots
- Order: Caryophyllales
- Family: Tamaricaceae
- Genus: Tamarix
- Species: T. gallica

Binomial name
- Tamarix gallica L.

Synonyms
- Tamarix anglica; Tamarix algeriensis; Tamarix brachylepis; Tamarix madritensis

= Tamarix gallica =

Species of plant

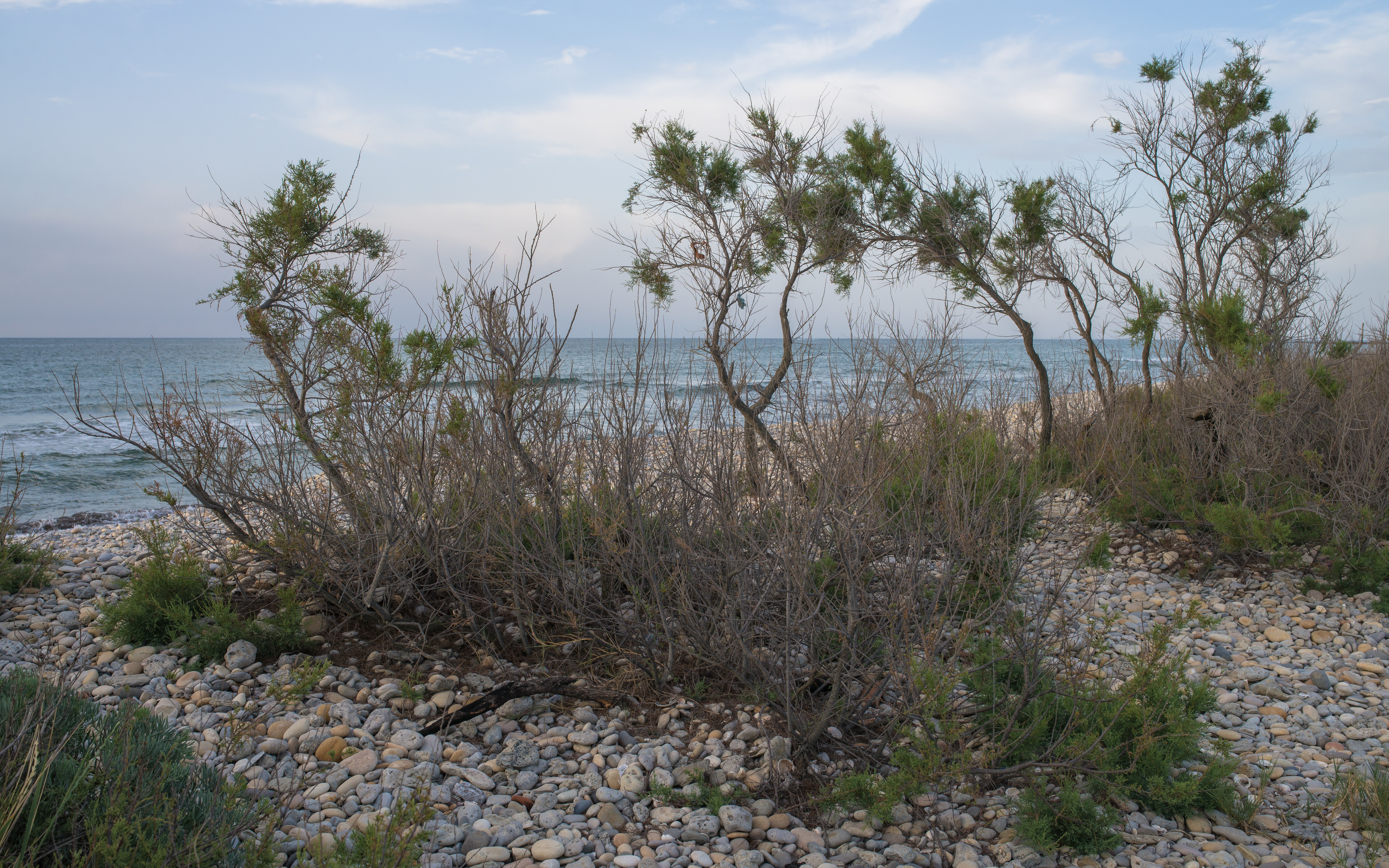
In front of the sea in Vic-la-Gardiole.

Tamarix gallica, also known as the French tamarisk, is a deciduous, herbaceous, twiggy shrub or small tree reaching up to about 5 meters high.

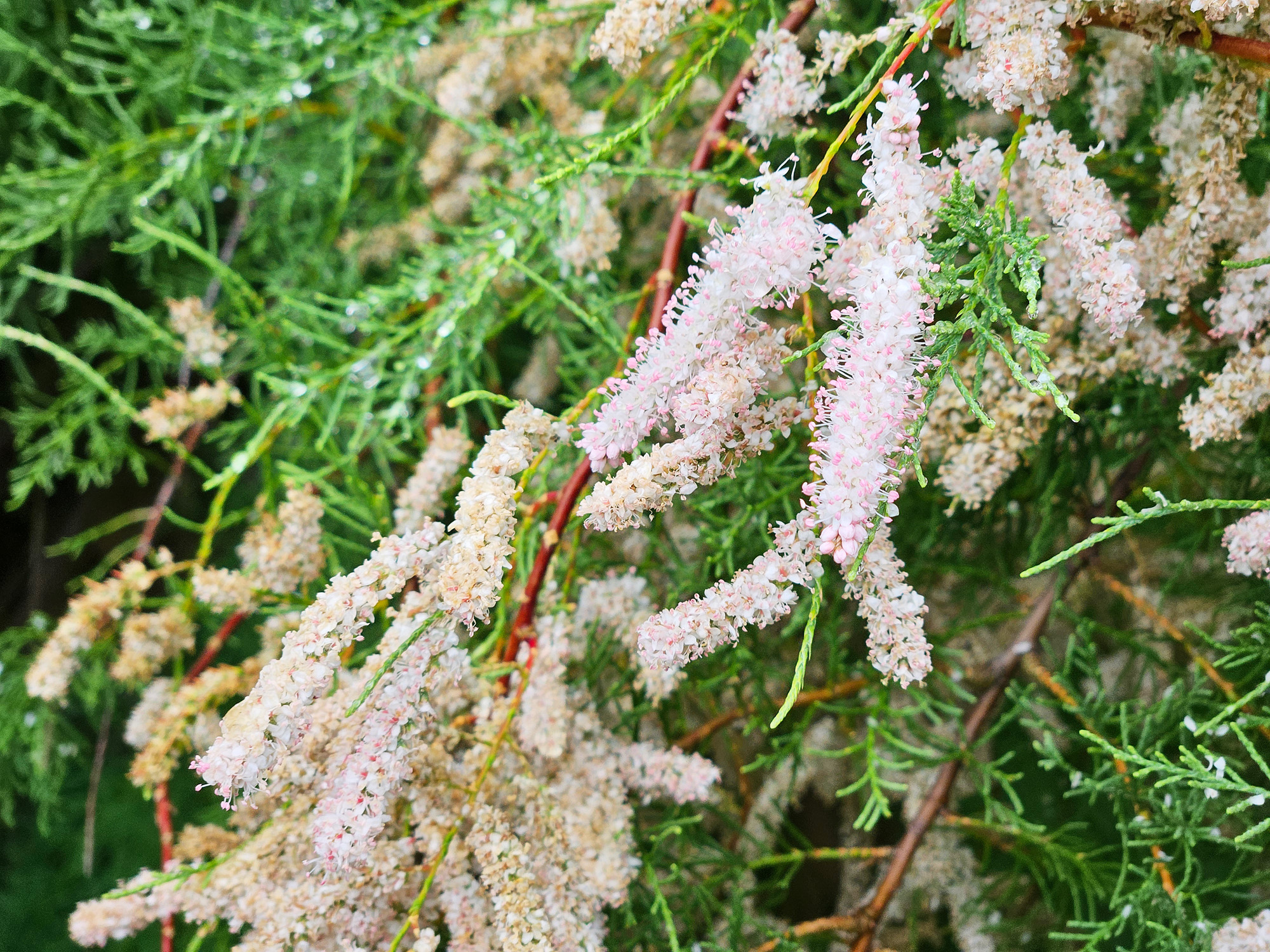
Tamarix gallica L., Azores

It is indigenous to Saudi Arabia and the Sinai Peninsula, and very common around the Mediterranean region. It is present in many other areas as an invasive introduced species, often becoming a noxious weed. It was first described for botanical classification by the taxonomist Carl Linnaeus in 1753, but had already been in cultivation since 1596.

== Description ==
It has fragile, woody branchlets that drop off in autumn along with the small, scale-like leaves that cover them. The leaf-shape is an adaptation over time to exceedingly dry conditions.

The pink flowers are tiny, hermaphroditic, and are borne on narrow, feather-like spikes. They frequently bloom earlier than the leaves, first in May, and sometimes a second time in August.

In its native range the plant grows in moist areas such as riverbanks, especially in saline soils. It has been grown as an ornamental plant for its profuse production of showy pink flower spikes. In Algeria and surrounding areas it has been used medicinally for rheumatism, diarrhea, and other maladies. Its juice is an ingredient for Gaz, a Persian delicacy from Isfahan.
