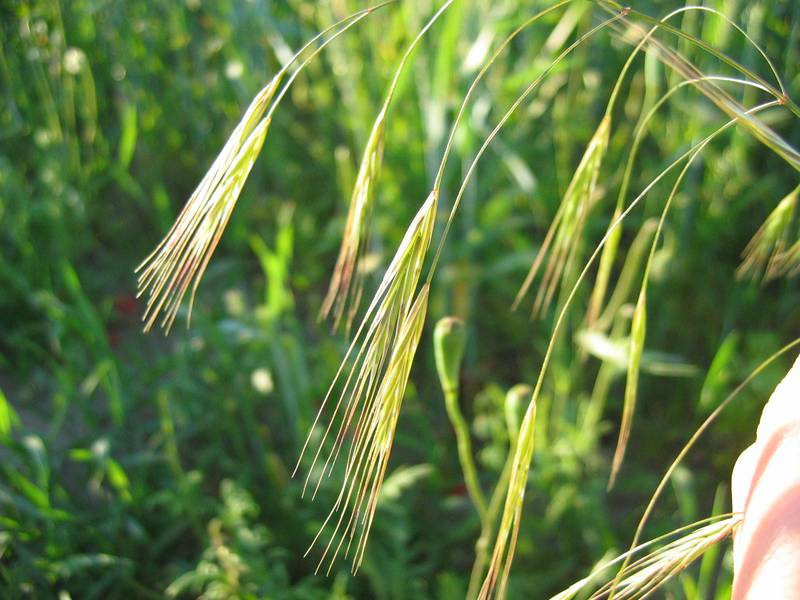

Scientific classification
- Kingdom: Plantae
- Clade: Tracheophytes
- Clade: Angiosperms
- Clade: Monocots
- Clade: Commelinids
- Order: Poales
- Family: Poaceae
- Subfamily: Pooideae
- Genus: Bromus
- Species: B. sterilis

Binomial name
- Bromus sterilis L.

Synonyms
- Anisantha sterilis (L.) Nevski; Zerna sterilis (L.) Panz. (nom. inval.)

= Bromus sterilis =

Species of grass

Bromus sterilis is an annual or biennial species of bromegrass known as barren brome, poverty brome, and sterile brome.

== Description ==
This is an annual or biennial grass ranging from about 20 to 90 centimeters in maximum height. Leaf blades are 2–6 mm wide and 6–25 cm long with short, soft hair. The inflorescence is a spreading panicle with the lower parts drooping more than the upper. The spikelet is up to 6 cm long.

The leaves are rough and hairy, green to purplish in colour. The ligule is pointed, toothed, 2 to 4 mm long.

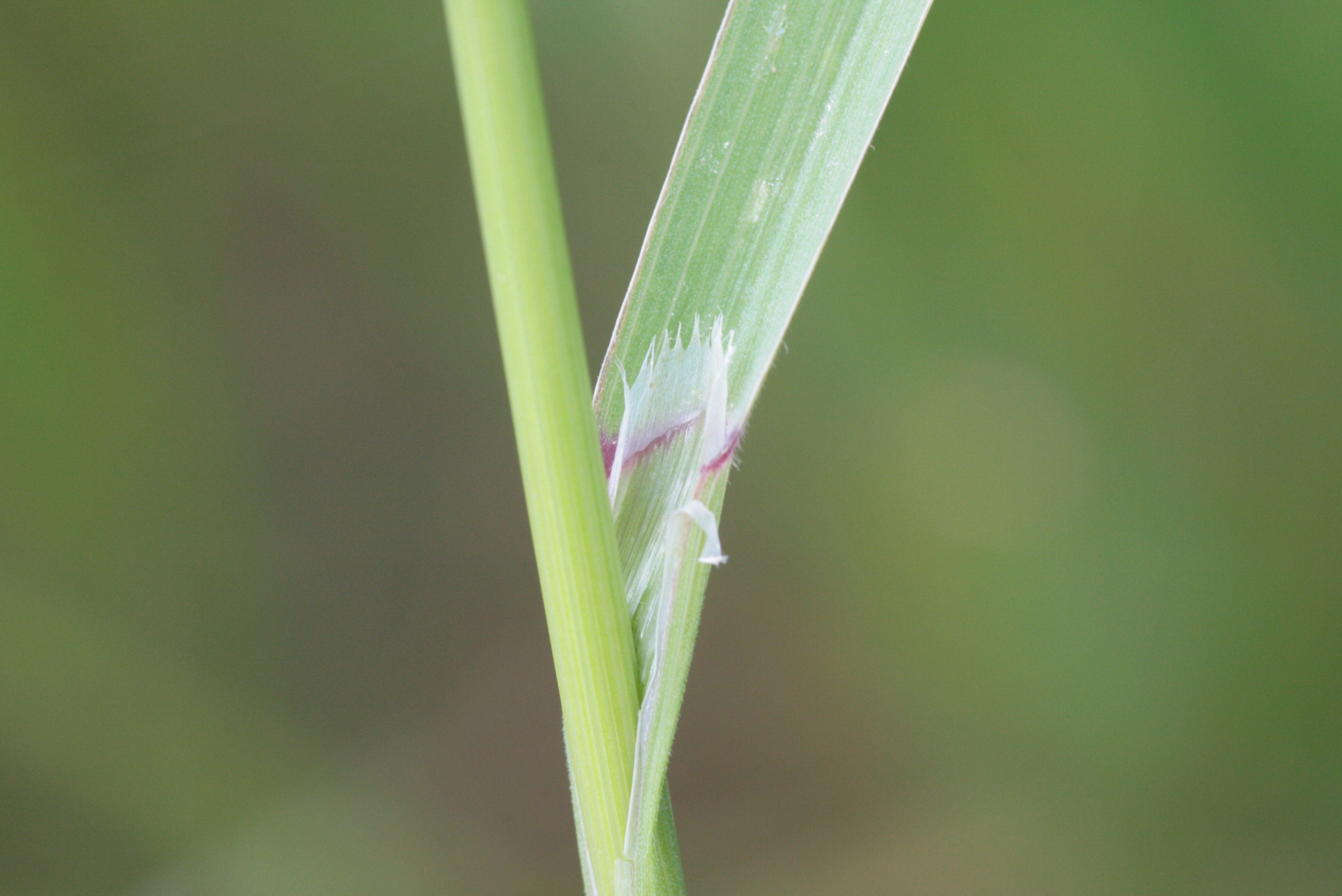
Ligule is pointed

The panicles are loose, open and nodding. The spikelets are 4 to 6 cm long, with awns, producing 4 to 10 flowers.

== Distribution ==
It can be found between sea level and 400 metres, along roadsides, hedge bottoms, and is a common weed of waste ground and gardens.

This grass is native to:

- northern Africa (Algeria, Morocco, and Tunisia);
- western and middle Asia (Afghanistan, Cyprus, Iran, Iraq, Israel, Jordan, Lebanon, Syria, Turkey, Turkmenistan, and Uzbekistan); the Caucasus (Armenia, Azerbaijan, Georgia, and the Russian Federation in Ciscaucasia and Dagestan);
- Europe (Albania, Austria, Belarus, Belgium, Bulgaria, the Czech Republic, Denmark, France, including Corsica, Germany, Greece, including Crete, Hungary, Ireland, Italy, including Sardinia and Sicily, Moldova, the Netherlands, Norway, Poland, Portugal, Romania, Spain, including the Balearic Islands, Sweden, Switzerland, Ukraine, the United Kingdom, and the former Yugoslavian states).

== Invasive plant species ==
It is well known in many parts of the world where it has become an introduced species. It is a noxious weed on the eastern and western sides of North America, an Invasive species in California.
