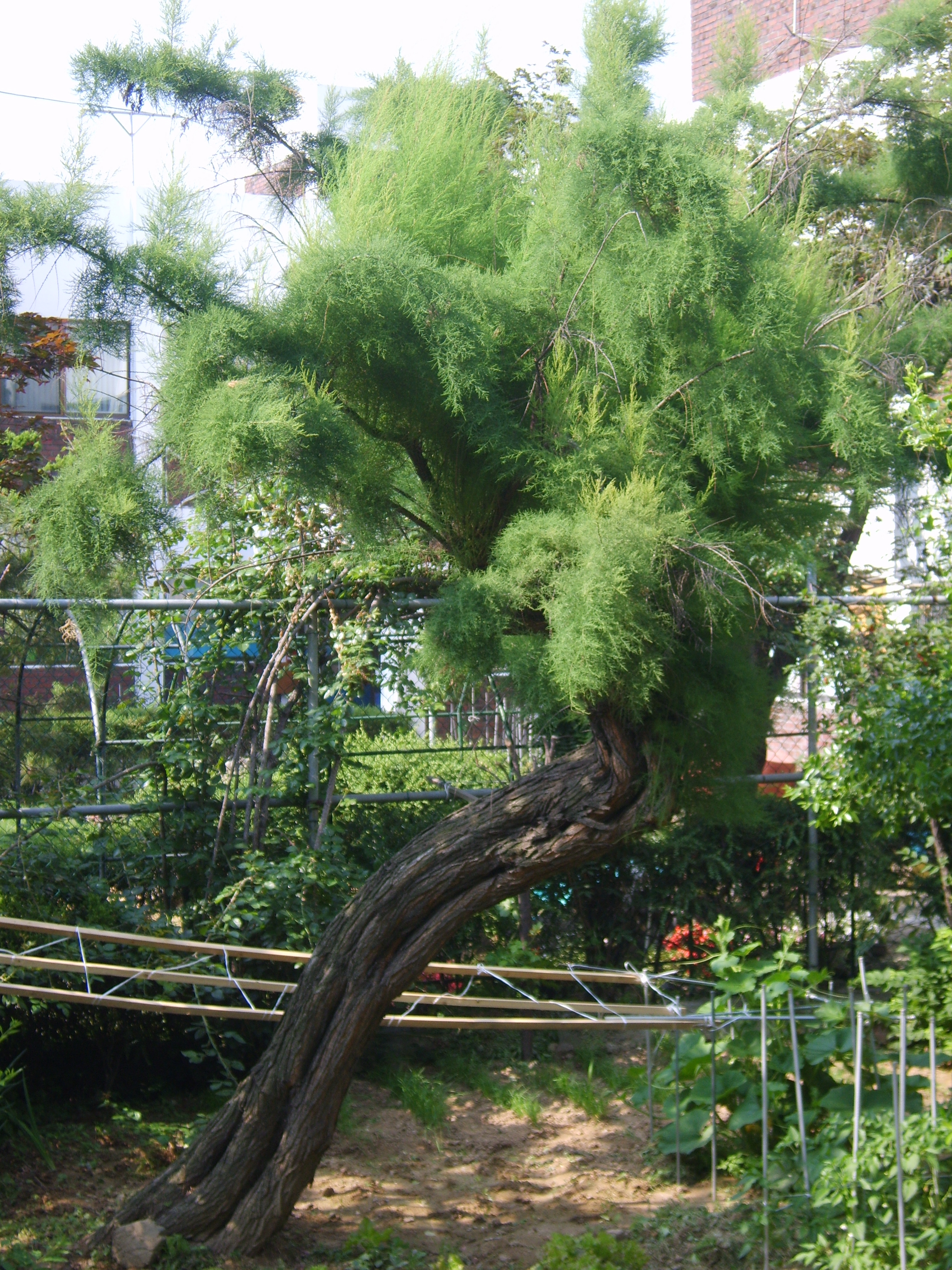

Conservation status
- Least Concern (IUCN 3.1)

Scientific classification
- Kingdom: Plantae
- Clade: Tracheophytes
- Clade: Angiosperms
- Clade: Eudicots
- Order: Caryophyllales
- Family: Tamaricaceae
- Genus: Tamarix
- Species: T. chinensis

Binomial name
- Tamarix chinensis Lour.

Synonyms
- Homotypic synonyms: Tamarix gallica var. chinensis (Lour.) Ehrenb.; Heterotypic synonyms: Tamarix caspica Dippel; Tamarix elegans Spach; Tamarix elegans plumosa J.R.Duncan & V.C.Davies; Tamarix japonica Dippel; Tamarix juniperina Bunge; Tamarix pallasii var. minutiflora Bunge; Tamarix plumosa Carrière

= Tamarix chinensis =

Species of tree

Tamarix chinensis is a species of flowering plant in the family Tamaricaceae. It is sometimes referred to by the common names five-stamen tamarisk and Chinese tamarisk or saltcedar. It is native to China and Korea, and it is known in many other parts of the world as an introduced species and sometimes an invasive noxious weed. It easily inhabits moist habitat with saline soils. It may grow as a tree with a single trunk or as a shrub with several spreading erect branches reaching 6 metres (20 ft) or more in maximum height. It has been known to reach 12 metres (39 ft). It has reddish, brown, or black bark. The small, multibranched twigs are covered in small lance-shaped, scale-like leaves which are no more than about 3 mm long. The inflorescence is a dense raceme of flowers a few cm long. Each fragrant flower has five petals which are usually pink but range from white to red.

This tamarisk hybridizes commonly with T. ramosissima in the North American invasion.

It has become an aggressive invader of wildlands in the southwestern United States, where it was once planted as an ornamental plant. It reproduces vegetatively from its roots and also from its foliage if it happens to be covered by soil, as in sediment-rich flooding. It also reproduces by its seed, which are tiny and tufted with hairs, easily dispersing on the wind. Despite its reputation as a noxious weed, the tree can be useful for wood, in honey production, and as a nesting site for various birds.

In its native habitat in China the plant forms thickets that act as useful barriers on the margins of waterways, including saline ocean shores.
