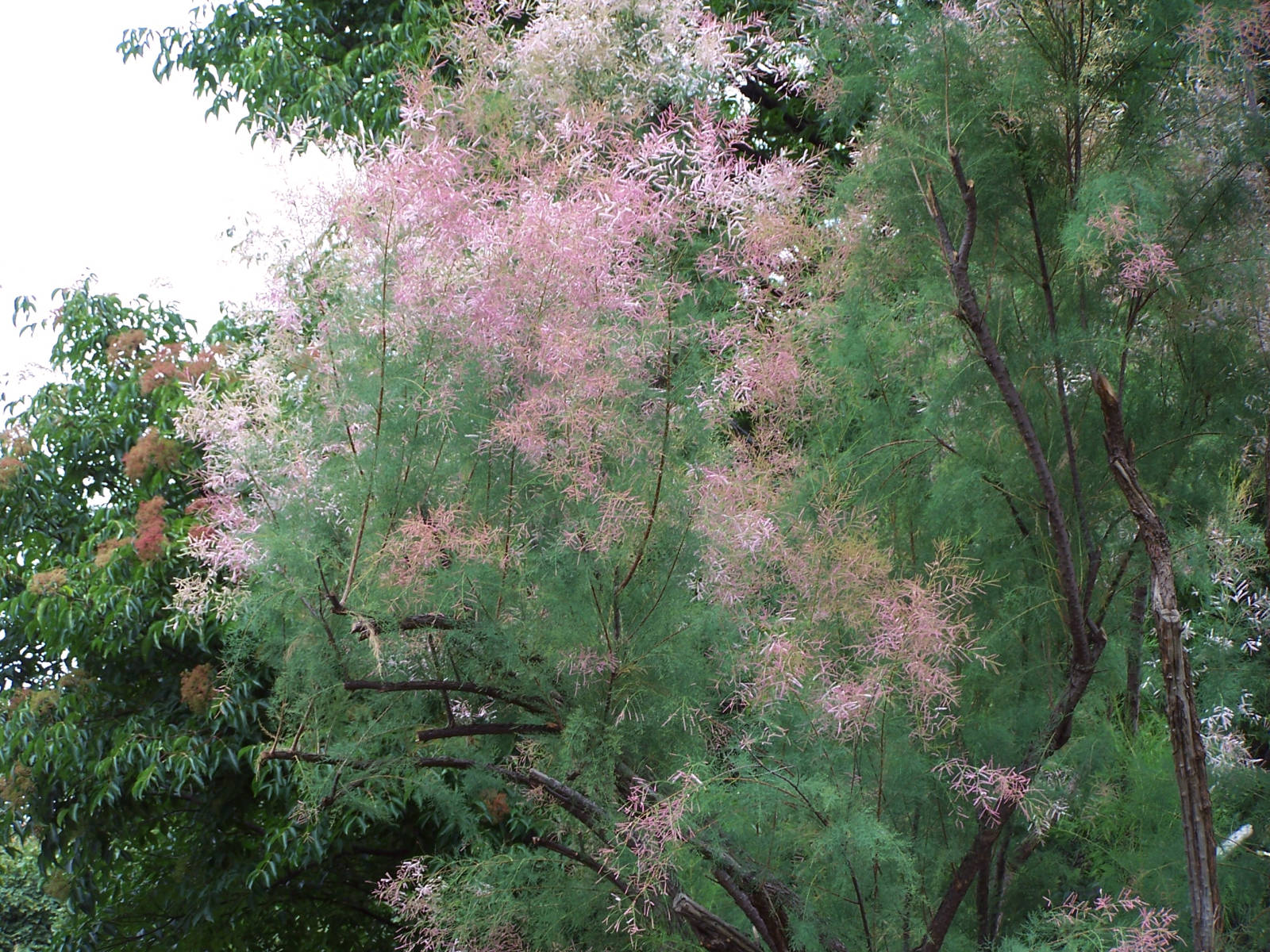

Scientific classification
- Kingdom: Plantae
- Clade: Tracheophytes
- Clade: Angiosperms
- Clade: Eudicots
- Order: Caryophyllales
- Family: Tamaricaceae
- Genus: Tamarix
- Species: T. ramosissima

Binomial name
- Tamarix ramosissima Ledeb.

= Tamarix ramosissima =

Species of shrub

Tamarix ramosissima, commonly known as saltcedar salt cedar, or tamarisk, is a deciduous arching shrub with reddish stems, feathery, pale green foliage, and characteristic small pink flowers.

The cultivar 'Pink Cascade' (dark pink flowered) has gained the Royal Horticultural Society's Award of Garden Merit.

== Description ==
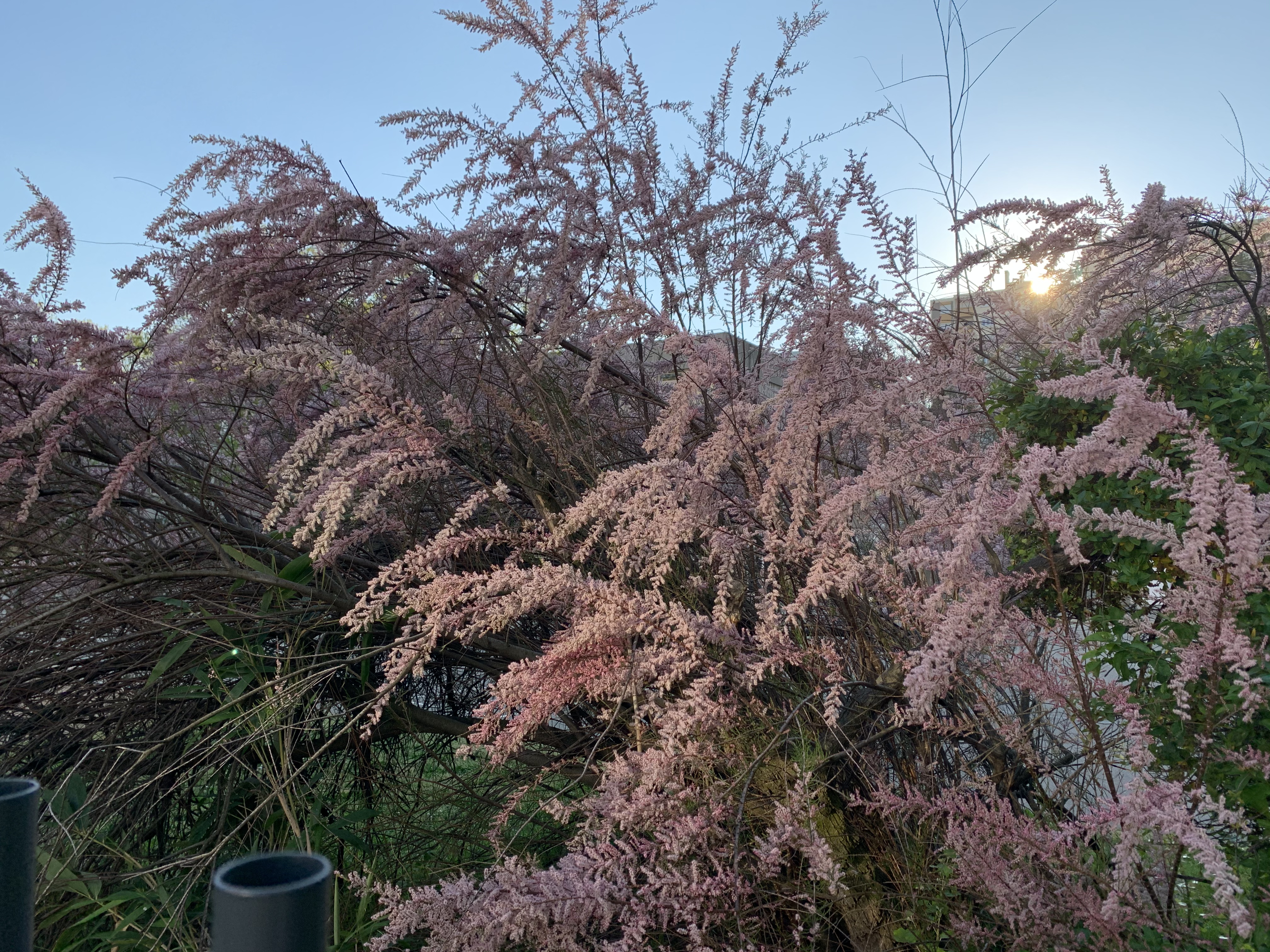
Tamarix ramossissima at Villeurbanne, France

Tamarix ramosissima is a hardy shrub or small tree native to Europe and Asia. It is a vigorous, deciduous shrub grown for its ornamental reddish stems, its showy plumes of flowers, and its unusual feathery leaves. Its hardiness and tolerance for poor soil make it a popular, easy to grow shrub. It can grow up to 8 metres (26 ft) in height and up to 5 metres (16 ft) in width. It can be used as a screen, windbreak, informal hedge or specimen shrub.

It produces upright racemes of small, pink, five-petaled flowers from late summer to early autumn which cover the new wood of the plant. It is tolerant of many soil types, but prefers a well-drained, light or sandy soil in full sun. This plant is considered an invasive species in warmer climates.

This tamarisk hybridizes commonly with T. chinensis in the North American invasion.

== Invasive species ==
Tamarix ramosissima is a major invasive plant species in the Southwestern United States and Desert Region of California, consuming large amounts of groundwater in riparian and oases habitats. The balance and strength of the native flora and fauna are being helped by various restoration projects, by removing tamarisk groves as if they were noxious weeds. Recent scientific investigations have generally concluded that the primary human-caused impact to desert riparian ecosystems within the Colorado River Basin is the alteration of the flood regime by dams; Tamarix ramosissima is relatively tolerant of this hydrologic alteration compared to flood-dependent native woody riparian species such as willow, cottonwood, and box elder.

Research on competition between tamarisk seedlings and co-occurring native trees has found that Tamarix seedlings are not competitive over a range of environments, but stands of mature trees effectively prevent native species' establishment in the understory, due to low light, elevated salinity, and possibly changes to the soil biota. Box elder (Acer negundo, a native riparian tree) seedlings survive and grow under higher-shade conditions than Tamarix seedlings, and mature Tamarix specimens die after 1–2 years of 98% shade, indicating a pathway for successional replacement of Tamarix by box elder. Anthropogenic activities that preferentially favor tamarisk (such as changes to flooding regimens) are associated with infestation. To date, Tamarix has taken over large sections of riparian ecosystems in the western United States that were once home to native cottonwoods and willows, and are projected by some to spread well beyond the current range.

== Salt ==
The plant's common name refers to its ability to tolerate salt water by excreting salt into its leaves through specialized salt glands — thereby producing salt deposits which kill other species; these salt deposits can also weaken interatomic binding in soil clays, leading to increased erosion. However, a study involving more than a thousand soil samples across gradients of both flood frequency and Tamarix density concluded that "flooding may be the most important factor for assessing floodplain salinity" and "soils under Tamarix canopies had lower surface soil salinity than open areas deprived of flooding suggesting that surface evaporation may contribute more to surface soil salinity than Tamarix".
