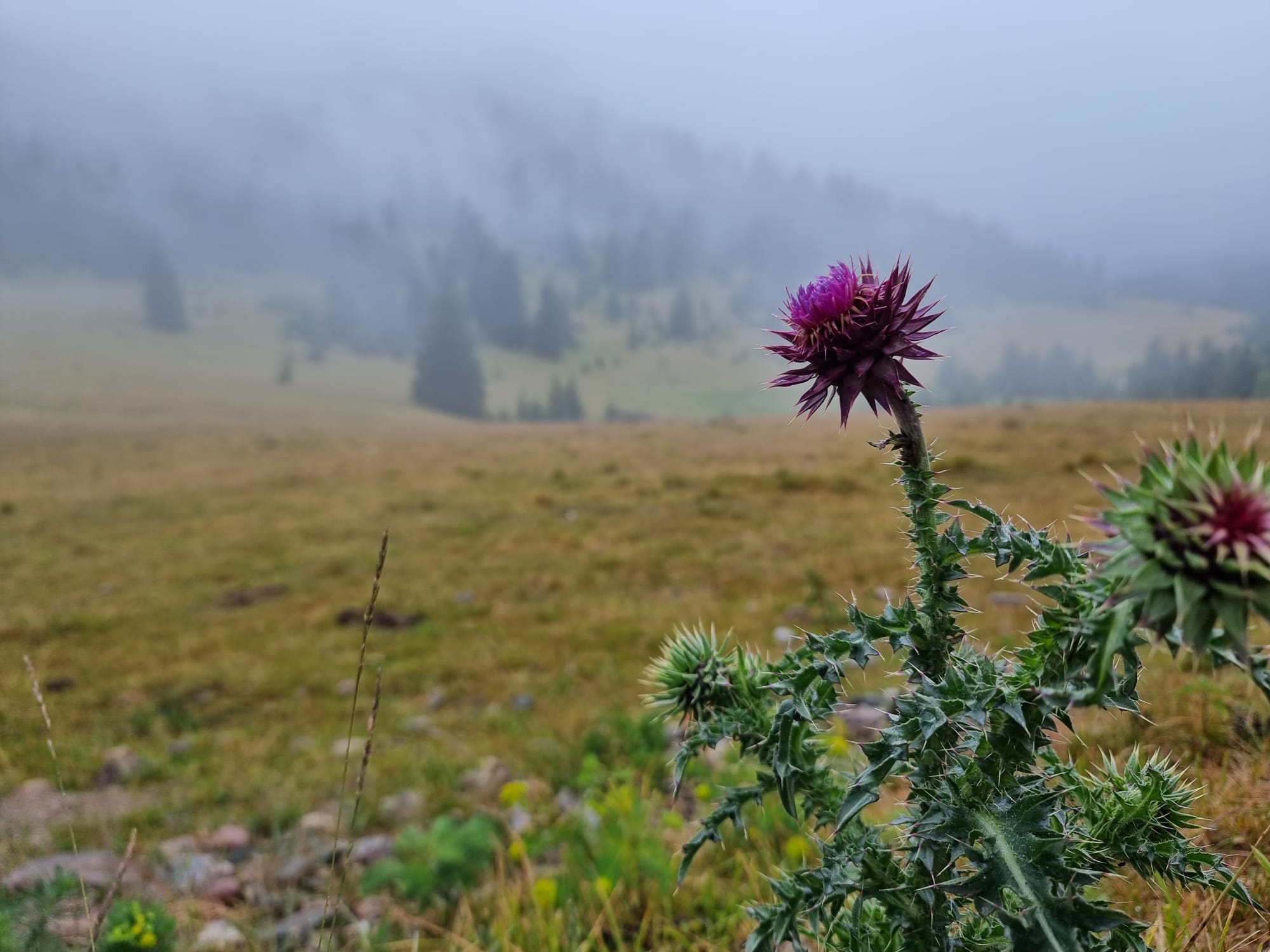
- Specimen on plateau near Bihor Mountains, Romania showing drooping inflorescence
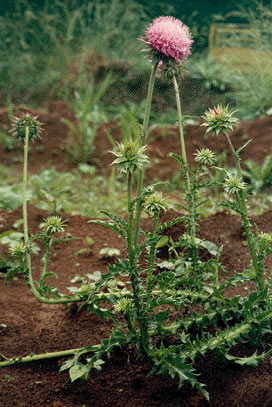
- Whole plant near Gatlinburg, Tennessee

Scientific classification
- Kingdom: Plantae
- Clade: Embryophytes
- Clade: Tracheophytes
- Clade: Spermatophytes
- Clade: Angiosperms
- Clade: Eudicots
- Clade: Asterids
- Order: Asterales
- Family: Asteraceae
- Genus: Carduus
- Species: C. nutans

Binomial name
- Carduus nutans L.

= Carduus nutans =

Species of flowering plant in the daisy family

Carduus nutans is a biennial plant in the daisy and sunflower family Asteraceae with the common names musk thistle, nodding thistle, and nodding plumeless thistle. It is native to regions of Europe, Central Asia, and North Africa, where it is a scattered pasture plant. The musk thistle has been declared as invasive in North America, Australia, New Zealand, and South Africa.

== Description ==
Carduus nutans is a monocarpic herb and is classified as a biennial thistle, though it can have varying phenology depending on climate and habitat. Mature plants can reach 2.7 m (9 ft) in height with multi-branched stems. The leaves are prickly and jagged and can reach up to 40 cm (1.3 ft) in length. The leaves are dark green, coarsely bipinnately lobed, with a smooth, waxy surface and sharp yellow-brown to whitish spines at the tips of the lobes. They are more or less hairy on top, and wooly on the veins below. The stem is cottony/hairy, with thin ribs along them. The plants develop a rosette, with large leaves up to about 40 centimetres (16 inches) long. The seeds are able to germinate between 15 and 30 °C (59 and 86 °F), thriving in conditions that offer moist soil and an alternating day/night temperature. A single plant is able to produce around 100 seeds per flower, up to about 20,000 seeds per plant. Seeds are mainly wind dispersed and can survive in the soil seed bank for up to 20 years.

=== Flowers ===
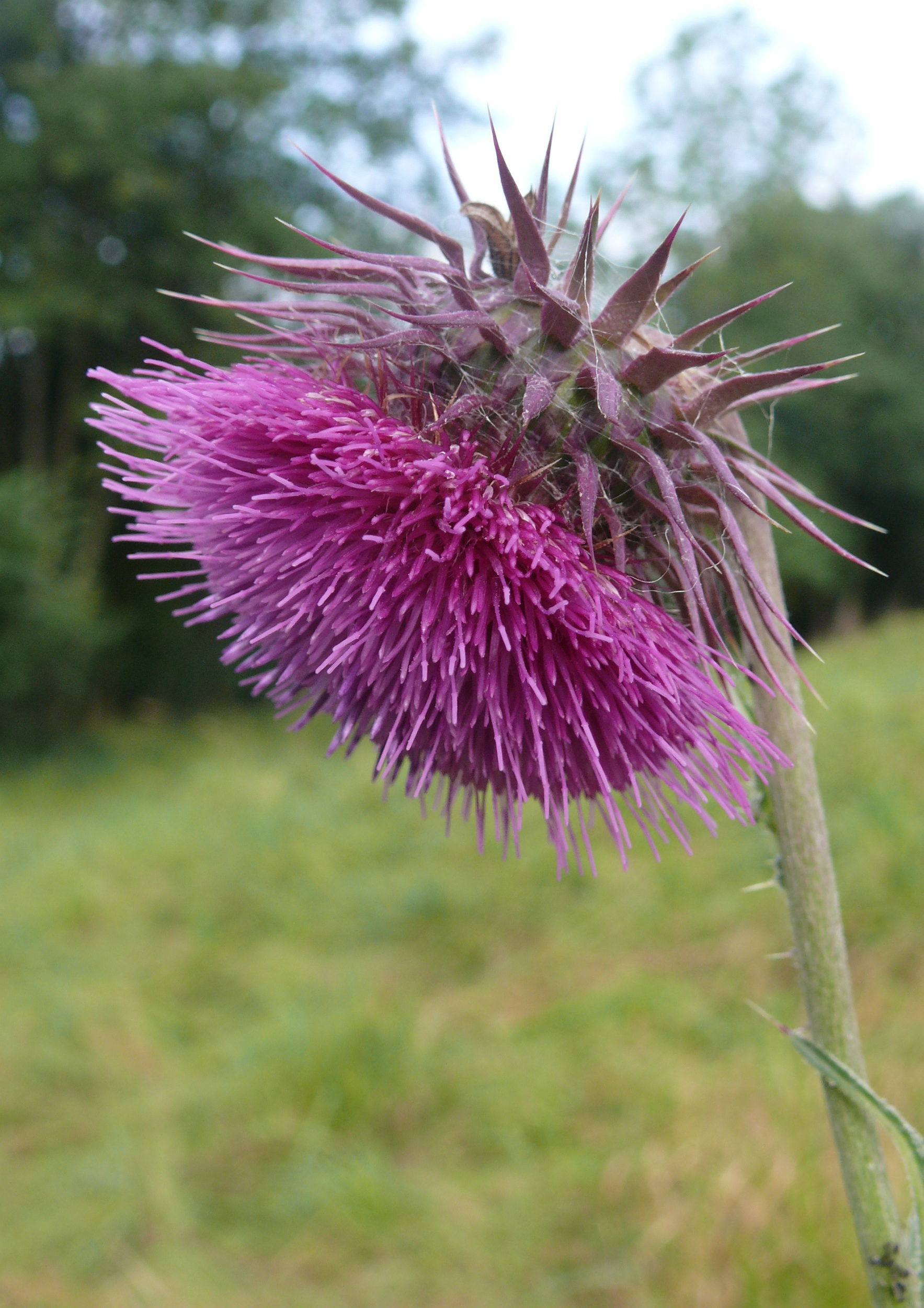
Flower head

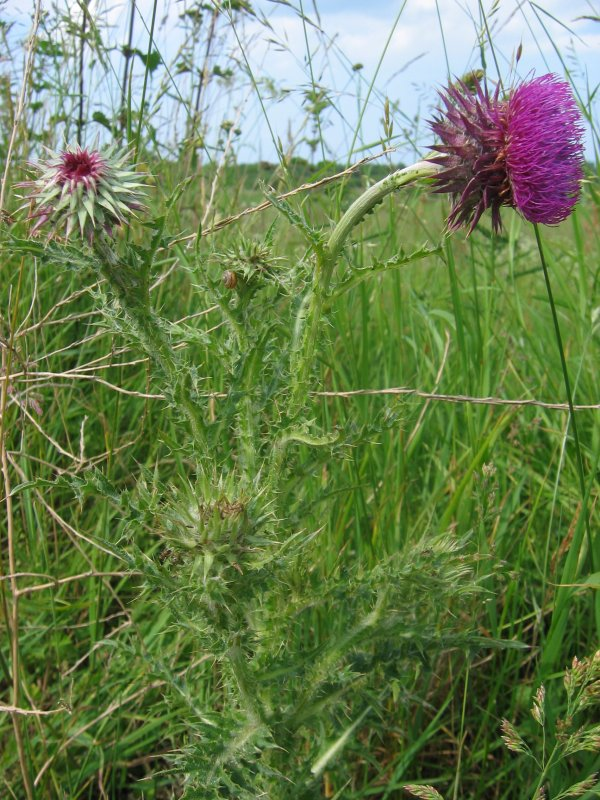
Blooming in grassland habitat

The plant bears showy flowers that range from a deep rose to violet color, rarely white. The large globose flower heads, containing hundreds of tiny individual flowers, are 3–5 cm (1 1/4–2 in), rarely to 7 cm (2 3/4 in), in diameter and occur at the tips of stems. The flower heads commonly droop to a 90° to 120° angle from the stem when mature, hence its alternate name of "nodding thistle". Each plant may produce thousands of straw-colored seeds adorned with plume-like bristles. They are 4 to 6 cm (1 1/2 to 2 1/4 in) across, with purple-red bracts.

The number of flower heads per plant is site-dependent and ranges from about 20–50 on good sites and 1–20 on poor sites. Flowering occurs from June to October, and seed dissemination occurs approximately one month after the flowers form.

== Distribution and habitat ==
Carduus nutans is native to Europe, Western Siberia, Asia, and North Africa. It has become invasive in North America, Australia, New Zealand, and Southern Africa. It is abundant in the North American Rocky Mountains. The plant can grow at least to an elevation of 1,830 m (6,000 ft). It typically grows in meadows and grasslands, in heavily grazed land in areas such as pastures, and on open disturbed soil such as roadsides and building sites. It is found in neutral to acidic soils. It spreads rapidly in areas subjected to frequent natural disturbances such as landslides and flooding, but does not grow well in excessively wet, dry, or shady conditions.

== Uses ==
=== Medicinal ===
Herbal decoctions have historically included Carduus nutans. Turkish folk medicine has used parts of the flowering branches to treat prostate disease. It has also been documented that it has been used for treatment of liver disease, malaria, constipation, and kidney stones.

== Ecology ==
Climate and habitat play a large role in phenology of Carduus nutans. Classified as a biennial, it can also act as a summer or winter annual, as well as a perennial, depending on varying environmental conditions.

== Invasive species ==
Carduus nutans is an invasive species in various regions around the world, including in disturbed and agricultural settings, pastures, rangelands, along roadsides, and in natural habitats. The first report of C. nutans in the United States was in Pennsylvania in 1852. It is declared a noxious weed in many U.S. states, Canadian provinces, South Africa, New Zealand, and Australia. The plant is especially fertile, producing up to 20,000 seeds per plant, that allows it to take root quickly and replace natural vegetation. Pastures and rangelands suffer from decreased productivity and the sharp spines of the plant make an unsuitable grazing area for livestock.

=== Biological control ===
Several biological control agents have been released in attempt to control C. nutans. In Australia, some of those that have been released include Rhinocyllus conicus, Urophora solstitialis, and Trichosirocalus horridus. In the United States there has been success with Rhinocyllus conicus, Trichosirocalus horridus, and Puccinia carduorum. Previous populations in Southern California were eradicated, but it remains in northern California. When biological control is successful, natural plants are shown to return to the habitat.

== Effects on biodiversity ==
Carduus nutans reduces forage biomass availability for livestock through competition for nutrients. The spiny plants affect movement of animals through the area, further decreasing availability of forage biomass. It also causes soil erosion on roadways and wastelands.
