= List of invasive plant species in California =

A list of invasive plant species in California.

Numerous plants have been introduced to the California Floristic Province and within the state's borders. Many of them have become invasive species and/or noxious weeds.
The following are some of these species:

== List ==
- Acacia dealbata—silver wattle
- Acacia melanoxylon—blackwood acacia
- Acacia paradoxa—paradox acacia
- Agrostis avenacea—Pacific bentgrass
- Ailanthus altissima—tree-of-heaven
- Aira caryophyllea
- Allium neapolitanum—white garlic
- Alliaria petiolata
- Alternanthera philoxeroides—alligatorweed
- Alternanthera sessilis—sessile joyweed
- Ammophila arenaria
- Ammophila breviligulata
- Ampelodesmos
- Andropogon virginicus
- Arctotheca calendula—capeweed
- Artemisia biennis
- Anthoxanthum odoratum—sweet vernal grass
- Arundo donax—giant reed
- Asparagus aethiopicus
- Asparagus asparagoides—bridal creeper
- Atriplex lindleyi
- Atriplex rosea
- Atriplex semibaccata—Australian saltbush
- Atriplex suberecta
- Avena barbata—slender oat
- Avena fatua—wild oats
- Avena sterilis—animated oat
- Azolla pinnata
- Brachypodium distachyon—annual false-brome
- Brachypodium sylvaticum—slender false-brome
- Brassica nigra—black mustard
- Brassica rapa-field mustard
- Brassica tournefortii
- Briza maxima—rattlesnake grass
- Bromus alopecuros
- Bromus arenarius
- Bromus catharticus
- Bromus commutatus
- Bromus diandrus—ripgut brome
- Bromus hordeaceus—soft chess
- Bromus madritensis ssp. rubens—red brome
- Bromus secalinus
- Bromus sterilis
- Bromus tectorum—cheatgrass
- Broom (plant)
- Cardaria draba—whitetop
- Carduus acanthoides
- Carduus crispus
- Carduus nutans—musk thistle
- Carduus pycnocephalus—Italian thistle
- Carduus tenuiflorus—winged plumeless thistle
- Carpobrotus chilensis—sea-fig
- Carpobrotus edulis—iceplant
- Castor oil plant
- Caulerpa taxifolia
- Centaurea calcitrapa—purple starthistle
- Centaurea diffusa—diffuse knapweed
- Centaurea iberica—Iberian knapweed
- Centaurea solstitialis—yellow starthistle
- Centaurea sulphurea—sulphur knapweed
- Centaurea virgata—squarrose knapweed
- Chenopodiastrum murale
- Chenopodium vulvaria
- Chloris gayana
- Cirsium arvense—Canada thistle
- Cirsium ochrocentrum—yellowspine thistle
- Cirsium vulgare—bull thistle
- Cistus monspeliensis
- Conium
- Cordyline australis—New Zealand cabbage tree
- Cortaderia jubata—pampasgrass
- Cortaderia selloana—white pampasgrass
- Cotoneaster franchetii—Cotoneaster
- Cotoneaster lacteus—Parney's Cotoneaster
- Cotoneaster pannosus—silverleaf cotoneaster
- Crataegus monogyna—common hawthorn
- Crocosmia x crocosmiiflora—montbretia
- Cynara cardunculus—cardoon thistle
- Cynanchum louiseae
- Cynodon dactylon—Bermuda grass
- Cyperus rotundus
- Cytisus multiflorus
- Cytisus scoparius—Scotch broom
- Cytisus striatus—Portuguese broom
- Dactylis glomerata—orchard grass
- Dactyloctenium aegyptium
- Delairea odorata—Cape ivy, German ivy
- Digitalis purpurea—foxglove
- Diplotaxis muralis
- Diplotaxis tenuifolia
- Dittrichia graveolens
- Echium candicans—pride-of-Madeira
- Eichhornia crassipes—water hyacinth
- Elaeagnus angustifolia—Russian olive
- Equisetum—horsetail
- Equisetum hyemale—scouringrush horsetail
- Eragrostis cilianensis—candy grass
- Erica lusitanica—Spanish heath
- Erodium botrys—broadleaf filaree
- Erodium cicutarium—redstem filaree
- Erysimum repandum
- Eucalyptus camaldulensis—red gum
- Eucalyptus globulus—blue gum
- Euphorbia peplus
- Fallopia baldschuanica
- Fennel
- Festuca arundinacea—coarse fescue
- Festuca myuros—red-tailed fescue
- Ficus carica—edible fig
- Foeniculum vulgare—fennel
- Gazania linearis—gazania
- Genista canariensis—Canary Islands broom
- Genista linifolia—Mediterranean broom
- Genista monosperma—bridal veil broom
- Genista monspessulana—French broom
- Geranium dissectum—cutleaf geranium
- Geranium molle—covesfoot cranesbill
- Glyceria declinata—mannagrass
- Hedera canariensis—Algerian ivy
- Hedera helix—English ivy
- Hedypnois cretica
- Helichrysum petiolare—licorice plant
- Hirschfeldia incana—Mediterranean mustard
- Heteranthera limosa
- Holcus lanatus—velvet grass, Yorkshire fog
- Hordeum marinum—Mediterranean barley
- Hordeum murinum—hare barley
- Hyparrhenia hirta
- Hypericum canariense—Canary Island St John's wort
- Hypericum grandifolium—large-leaved St John's wort
- Hypericum perforatum—St John's Wort
- Ilex aquifolium—English holly
- Ipomoea cairica—Coast Morning Glory
- Ipomoea indica—blue morning glory
- Iris missouriensis—western blue flag iris
- Iris pseudacorus—yellowflag iris
- Ivy
- Kali tragus
- Koenigia polystachya (syn. Polygonum polystachyum)
- Lantana montevidensis—purple lantana
- Leucanthemum vulgare—ox-eye daisy
- Ligustrum ovalifolium—California privet
- Limnobium laevigatum
- Limonium perezii—sea lavender
- Limonium ramosissimum ssp. provincale—Algerian sea lavender
- Lobularia maritima—sweet alyssum
- Lolium multiflorum—Italian ryegrass
- Ludwigia hexapetala—creeping waterprimrose
- Malva nicaeensis
- Marrubium vulgare—horehound
- Medicago polymorpha—burclover
- Melilotus indicus
- Mentha pulegium—pennyroyal
- Mesembryanthemum crystallinum—common iceplant
- Myoporum laetum—myoporum
- Myosotis latifolia—common forget-me-not
- Myriophyllum aquaticum—parrotfeather
- Myriophyllum spicatum—spike watermilfoil
- Nassella manicata—Andean tussockgrass
- Nicotiana glauca—tree tobacco
- Nymphaeaceae—water lilies
- Oenothera glazioviana—redsepal evening primrose
- Olea europaea—olive
- Onopordum acanthium—Scotch thistle
- Oncosiphon pilulifer-sinkweed
- Oxalis pes-caprae—Bermuda buttercup
- Parietaria judaica—spreading pellitory
- Paspalum dilatatum—dallisgrass
- Pennisetum clandestinum—kikuyugrass
- Pennisetum setaceum—fountain grass
- Phalaris aquatica—harding grass
- Phoenix canariensis—Canary Island date palm
- Piptatherum miliaceum—smilo grass
- Pistacia atlantica
- Plantago lanceolata—English plantain
- Poa pratensis—Kentucky bluegrass
- Polygonum arenastrum
- Polypogon australis—beardgrass
- Prunus cerasifera—cherry plum
- Prunus lusitanica—Portuguese laurel
- Psathyrostachys juncea
- Puccinellia distans
- Pyracantha angustifolia—narrowleaf firethorn
- Pyracantha coccinea—European firethorn
- Pyracantha crenulata—firethorn
- Ranunculus repens—creeping buttercup
- Raphanus sativus—wild radish
- Retama monosperma—bridal veil broom
- Reynoutria japonica (syn. Polygonum cuspidatum)—Japanese knotweed
- Ricinus communis—castor bean
- Robinia pseudoacacia—black locust
- Rubus armeniacus—Himalayan blackberry
- Rubus laciniatus—barbwire Russian thistle
- Rumex crispus—curly dock
- Saccharum ravennae—ravennagrass
- Salsola paulsenii—barbwire Russian thistle
- Salsola soda—oppositeleaf Russian thistle
- Salsola tragus—Russian thistle
- Salvia aethiopis—African sage
- Schinus molle—Peruvian/California pepper tree
- Schinus terebinthifolius—Brazilian pepper tree
- Setaria verticillata
- Silybum marianum—milk thistle
- Sinapis arvensis—canola
- Solanum elaeagnifolium
- Solanum lanceolatum
- Spartina alterniflora—smooth cordgrass
- Spartina densiflora—Chilean cordgrass
- Spartina patens—Salt marsh hay
- Spartium—broom
- Spartium junceum—Spanish broom
- Stipa capensis—cape ricegrass
- Tamarix aphylla—athol
- Tamarix chinensis—Chinese tamarisk
- Tamarix gallica—French tamarisk
- Tamarix parviflora—smallflower tamarisk
- Tamarix ramosissima—salt cedar, tamarisk
- Tanacetum vulgare—common tansy
- Tetragonia tetragonioides—New Zealand spinach
- Torilis arvensis—spreading hedgeparsley
- Trifolium angustifolium
- Trifolium dubium
- Trifolium hirtum—rose clover
- Trisetum flavescens
- Ulex—gorse
- Ulex europaeus—common gorse
- Undaria pinnatifida—wakame
- Verbascum thapsus—wooly mullein
- Vinca
- Vinca major—periwinkle
- Vinca minor—dwarf periwinkle
- Viola labradorica
- Vulpia myuros
- Wakame
- Washingtonia robusta—Mexican fan palm
- Watsonia meriana—watsonia
- Zantedeschia aethiopica—calla lily
- Zostera japonica—Japanese eelgrass

== See also ==
- List of California native plants
- Invasive species in the United States
- Natural history of California
