= Pappe =

Pappe (German: Pappe) — German: Pappe, French (Alsatian) or Jewish last name.

- Karl Wilhelm Ludwig Pappe (1803–1862), German botanist
- Julien Pappé (1920–2005), Polish director of animation movies
- Christel Pappe (born 1935), German politician
- Ilan Pappé (born 1954), Israeli historian and socialist activist
- Vadim Pappe (1942–2012), Russian art and dance historian and author
