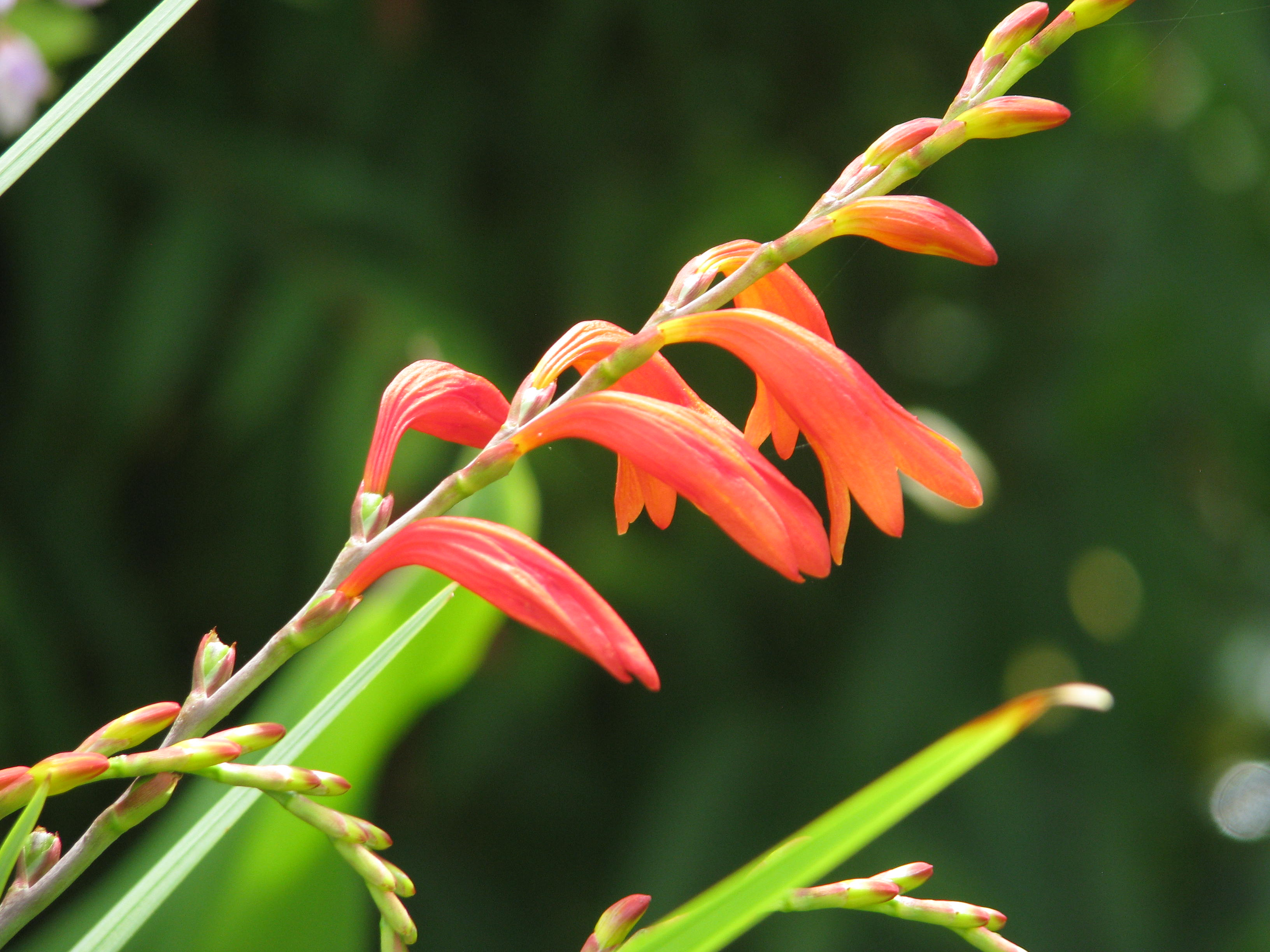
- Close-up of flowers
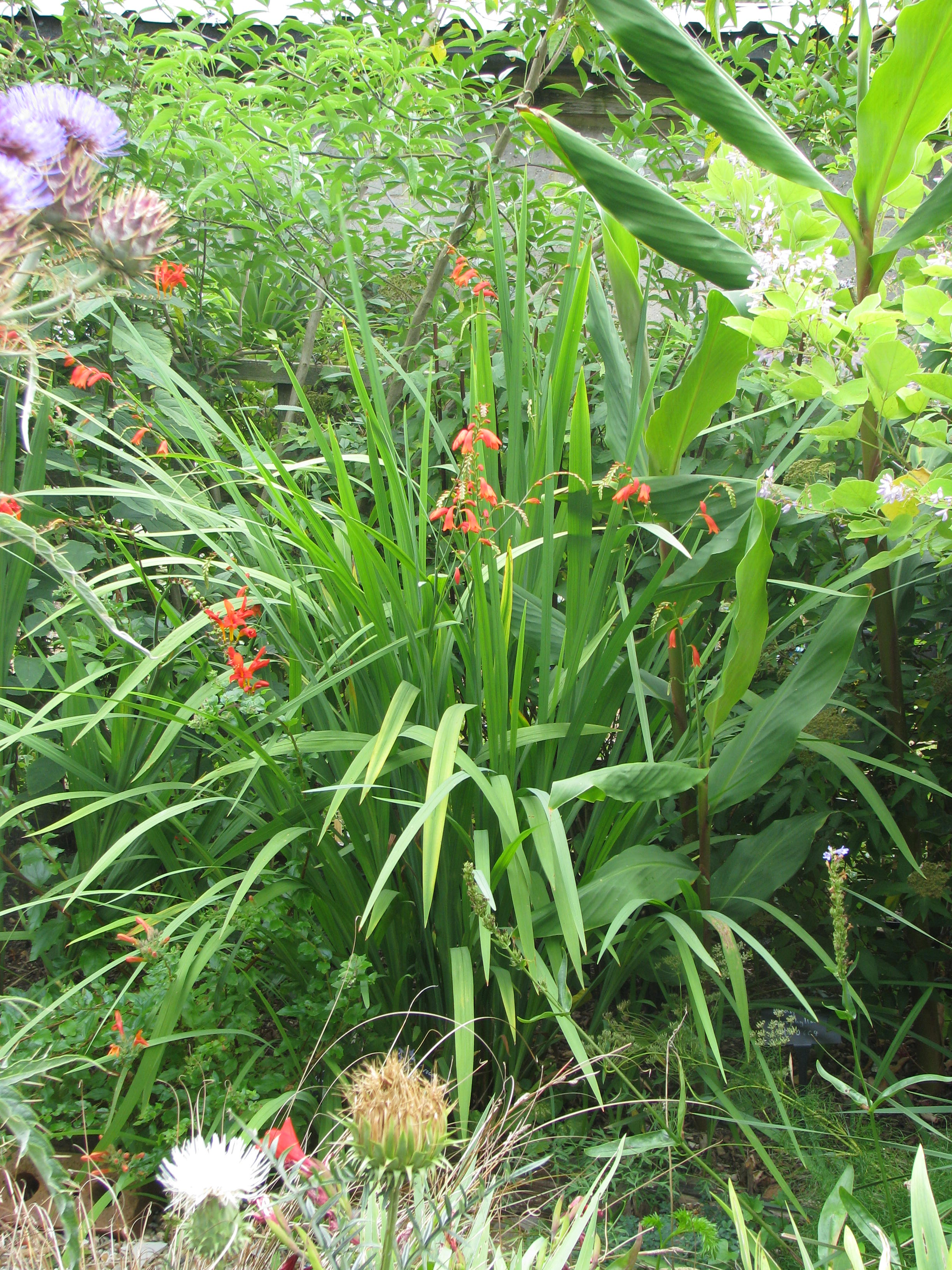
- In a garden setting

Scientific classification
- Kingdom: Plantae
- Clade: Tracheophytes
- Clade: Angiosperms
- Clade: Monocots
- Order: Asparagales
- Family: Iridaceae
- Genus: Crocosmia
- Species: C. pottsii

Binomial name
- Crocosmia pottsii (Baker) N.E.Br.

Synonyms
- Gladiolus pottsii McNab ex Baker; Montbretia pottsii Baker; Tritonia pottsii (Baker) Benth. ex Baker

= Crocosmia pottsii =

Species of flowering plant

Crocosmia pottsii, Potts' montbretia, is a species of flowering plant in the family Iridaceae, native to KwaZulu-Natal and the southern Cape Provinces of South Africa, and introduced in Colombia. With Crocosmia aurea it is a parent of the widely cultivated Crocosmia × crocosmiiflora (the montbretia).
