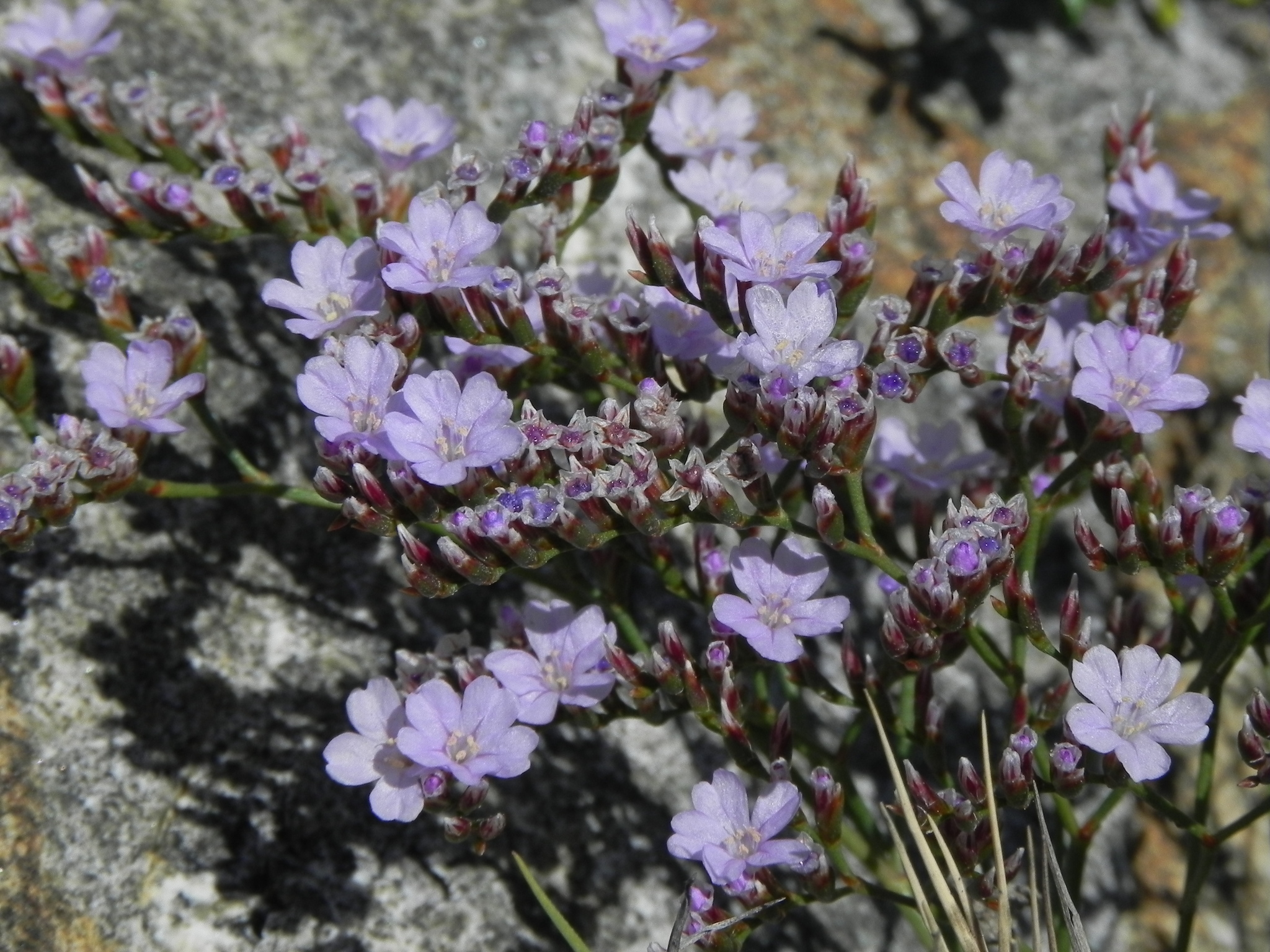
- Flowers

Scientific classification
- Kingdom: Plantae
- Clade: Embryophytes
- Clade: Tracheophytes
- Clade: Angiosperms
- Clade: Eudicots
- Order: Caryophyllales
- Family: Plumbaginaceae
- Genus: Limonium
- Species: L. duriusculum

Binomial name
- Limonium duriusculum (Girard) Fourr.

Synonyms
- List: Limonium confusum subsp. duriusculum (Girard) P.Fourn.; Limonium confusum subsp. psilocladum P.Fourn.; Limonium confusum subsp. raddianum P.Fourn.; Limonium cuspidatum (Delort.) Erben; Statice cuspidata Delort.; Statice duriuscula Girard; Statice duriuscula var. cuspidata (Delort) Rouy; Statice globulariifolia subsp. cuspidatum (Delort) H.J.Coste; Statice hieronymi Sennen; Statice willdenowiana Rchb.

= Limonium duriusculum =

Species of plant

Limonium duriusculum, the European sea lavender, is a species of flowering plant in the family Plumbaginaceae, native to the western Mediterranean region of southwestern Europe. Introduced to California, it has become an invasive species in coastal salt marshes, where it threatens native vegetation and endangered species habitat.

== Description ==
Limonium duriusculum is a perennial herbaceous plant that forms basal rosettes of leaves. The leaves are obovate with blunt tips. It produces small purple flowers arranged in loose inflorescences, less compactly arranged than those of the closely related L. ramosissimum. In California, it flowers from September to June. Mature plants can produce between 360 and 11,400 seeds annually. The dry flower stalks and seeds are brittle, shatter easily, and float buoyantly on water.

== Taxonomy ==
The species was first described by French botanist Charles Frédéric Girard in 1844 as Statice duriuscula, based on specimens from two localities in southern France: the rocks of Sète in the Hérault department and Les Sablettes near Toulon in the Var. It was transferred to the genus Limonium by Jules Pierre Fourreau in 1869. The L. duriusculum species group comprises approximately ten species with a western Mediterranean distribution.

== Distribution and habitat ==
Limonium duriusculum is native to the western Mediterranean, occurring in France, Spain, the Balearic Islands, and Sardinia. In its native range, it inhabits coastal areas including salt marshes and rocky shores.

The species has been introduced to California, where it is found primarily in the San Francisco Bay Area and along the central and south coast, with populations extending into the Coast Ranges. It favours salt marshes, scrub, chaparral, and riparian habitats.

== Invasive species ==
Limonium duriusculum is considered an invasive species in California, where it poses a significant threat to native salt marsh ecosystems. The California Invasive Plant Council rates it as "Moderate" on its inventory of invasive plants, while the California Department of Food and Agriculture assigns it a "B" rating, indicating a pest of known environmental detriment with limited distribution in the state.

=== History of introduction ===
The species was first detected in California at Carpinteria Salt Marsh in Santa Barbara County sometime between 1990 and 1995, though it was initially misidentified as L. ramosissimum. It was first documented in the San Francisco Estuary in 2007 and in Morro Bay in 2011. The species may have been introduced through the horticultural trade, contaminated restoration plantings, or inadvertent inclusion in hydroseeding applications.

=== Spread and reproduction ===
The species spreads primarily via seed, which can be dispersed by water and human activities. Seeds are buoyant and can remain viable after floating in salt water for up to two weeks, and may persist in the soil for at least five years. Populations have been found up to 30 kilometres from other known occurrences, indicating capacity for long-distance dispersal. The species can establish in both disturbed and undisturbed marsh areas and is capable of doubling its population size within ten years.

=== Ecological impacts ===
Limonium duriusculum can form dense stands that displace native salt marsh vegetation. Studies at Carpinteria Salt Marsh found that the species was associated with decreased native plant cover over the course of one year, attributed to its ability to continue growing when most native plants senesce. Native species displaced include California sea lavender (L. californicum), Pacific pickleweed, saltgrass, and marsh jaumea.

The invasion threatens populations of salt marsh bird's-beak (Chloropyron maritimum subsp. maritimum), a federally endangered plant that occupies similar habitat. L. duriusculum also competes with salt marsh bird's-beak for pollinators, as it produces abundant flowers that attract native bees away from the endangered plant.

Upper marsh habitats invaded by L. duriusculum are important for endangered vertebrates including the California Ridgway's rail (Rallus obsoletus obsoletus) and salt marsh harvest mouse (Reithrodontomys raviventris), which rely on native plant canopies for nesting and refuge from predators. The short basal rosette growth form of L. duriusculum does not provide equivalent cover.

=== Management ===
Control efforts for L. duriusculum include hand removal, tarping, and herbicide treatments. Experiments have demonstrated that tarping can eradicate the species with minimal long-term negative impacts to native vegetation, while hand pulling and scraping are effective but require repeated application. Eradication programmes are ongoing at multiple locations including the San Francisco Bay, Morro Bay, Carpinteria Salt Marsh, and San Diego Bay.
