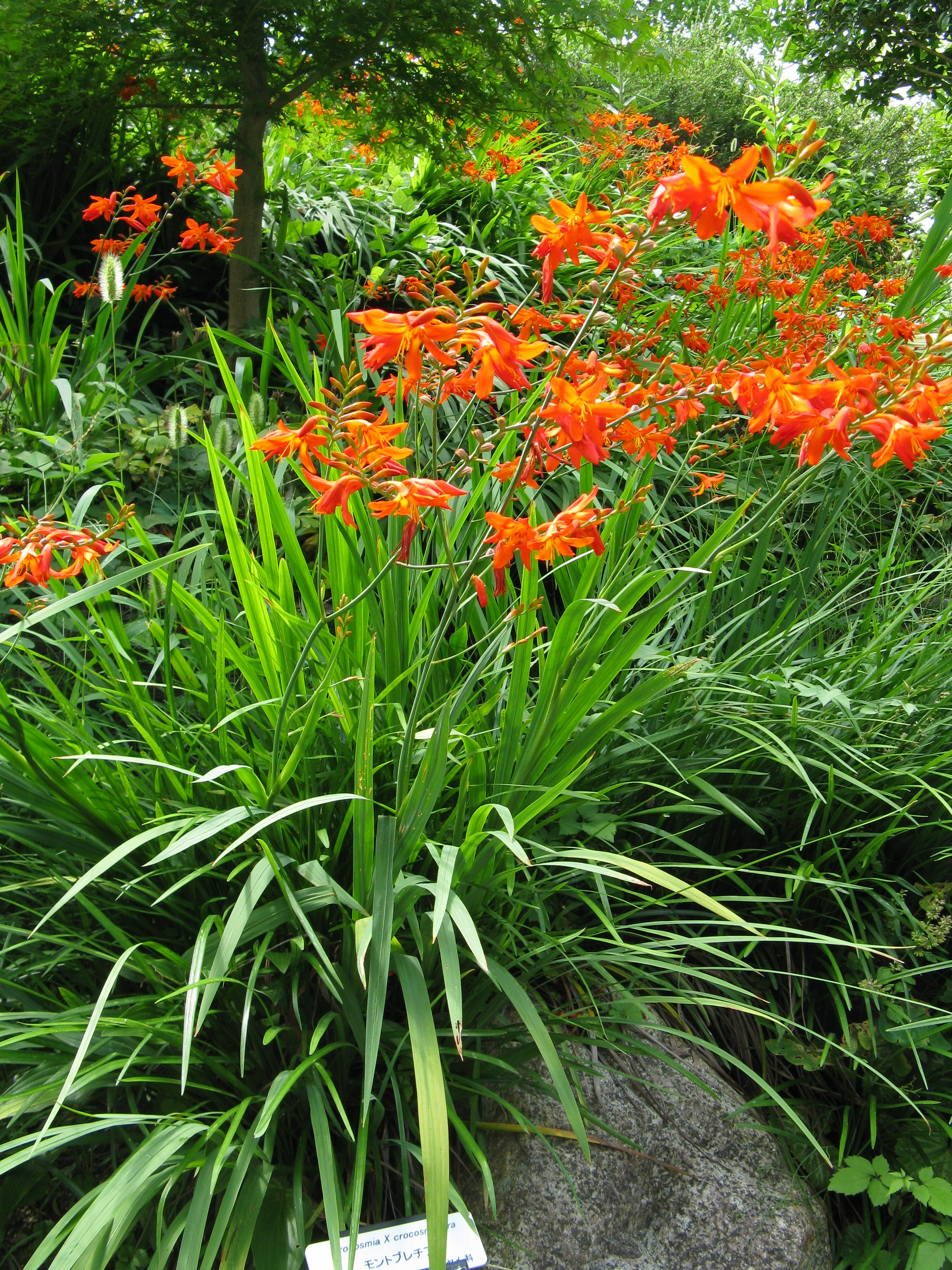

Scientific classification
- Kingdom: Plantae
- Clade: Tracheophytes
- Clade: Angiosperms
- Clade: Monocots
- Order: Asparagales
- Family: Iridaceae
- Genus: Crocosmia
- Species: C. × crocosmiiflora

Binomial name
- Crocosmia × crocosmiiflora (Lemoine) N.E.Br.

= Crocosmia × crocosmiiflora =

Species of flowering plant

Crocosmia × crocosmiiflora, or montbretia, is a garden hybrid of C. aurea and C. pottsii, (Note: Some sources mistakenly call this a hybrid of Crocosmia and Tritonia; the basionym of C. aurea is "Tritonia aurea".) first bred in 1880 in France by Victor Lemoine. The basionym of the hybrid is Montbretia crocosmiiflora Lemoine. In 1932 it was reclassified as C. × crocosmiiflora (Lemoine) N.E.Br., but the common name "montbretia" is still often found in horticultural literature, and is commonly used in the British Isles for orange-flowered cultivars that have naturalised, while "crocosmia" is reserved for less aggressive red-flowered cultivars.

== Description ==
Crocosmia × crocosmiiflora grows to 90 cm (36 in.) high, with long sword-shaped leaves, shorter than the flowering stem and arising from the plant base, ribbed and up to 20mm wide. The base is a corm, a swollen underground stem lasting one year. The flowers are up to 5 cm long and coloured deep orange.

== Cultivation ==
In the United States, Crocosmia × crocosmiiflora is considered suitable for planting in hardiness zones 5–9, but in more northerly locations it can be planted in the spring and the corms dug out in the fall. The corms should be planted in a well-drained garden soil in full sun to partial shade. The hybrid will set viable seed that can be grown as soon as ripe, but as a hybrid it will not breed true to colour. In Belfast, Northern Ireland, it is recorded as well-established in a wide range of locations.

There are over 150 named cultivars within C. × crocosmiiflora including:

- 'Babylon' − orange-red with yellow throats
- 'George Davison' − yellow
- 'His Majesty' − flowers large, orange
- 'Jackanapes' − flowers orange-red, inner lobes golden yellow
- 'Meteor' − orange yellow
- 'Solfatare' − yellow flowers with bronze foliage
- 'Star of the East' agm − light orange with pale centres

Those marked agm possessed the Royal Horticultural Society's Award of Garden Merit in 2023.

== Invasive species ==
Crocosmia × crocosmiiflora is deemed an invasive plant in the United Kingdom and the Isle of Man; also in New Zealand, where it is common on roadsides in the northern parts of the West Coast of the South Island. The New Zealand Department of Conservation classes it as an environmental weed.

The California Invasive Plants Council (Cal-IPC) lists Crocosmia × crocosmiiflora as an invasive plant in California, with limited concern and distribution.

It is widely naturalised in England and Scotland, especially along the western seaboard from Cornwall north all the way to Sutherland.
