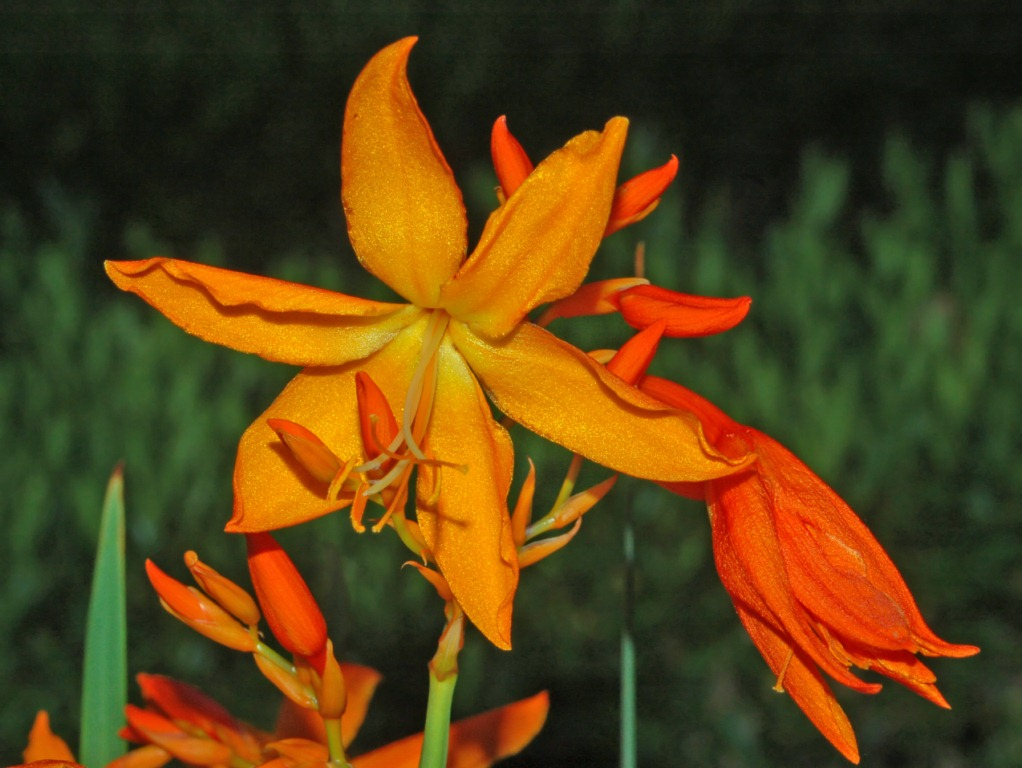
- Crocosmia aurea

Scientific classification
- Kingdom: Plantae
- Clade: Tracheophytes
- Clade: Angiosperms
- Clade: Monocots
- Order: Asparagales
- Family: Iridaceae
- Subfamily: Crocoideae
- Tribe: Freesieae
- Genus: Crocosmia; Planch.

Type species
- Crocosmia aurea (Pappe ex Hook.f.) Planch.

Synonyms
- Crocanthus Klotzsch ex Klatt name published without description; Curtonus N.E.Br.

= Crocosmia =

Genus of flowering plants in the iris family

Crocosmia (/krəˈkɒzmiə, kroʊ-/), also known as montbretia (/mɒnˈbriːʃə/), is a small genus of flowering plants in the iris family, Iridaceae. It is native to the grasslands of southern and eastern Africa, ranging from South Africa to Sudan. One species is endemic to Madagascar.

== Etymology ==
The genus name is derived from the Greek words krokos, meaning "saffron", and osme, meaning "odour" – from the dried leaves emitting a strong smell like that of saffron (a spice derived from Crocus – another genus belonging to the Iridaceae) when immersed in hot water.

The alternative name montbretia is still widely used, especially for the garden hybrid C. × crocosmiiflora. "Montbretia" is commonly used in the British Isles for orange-flowered C. × crocosmiiflora cultivars that have naturalised, while "crocosmia" is reserved for less aggressive red-flowered cultivars. Montbretia is also a heterotypic synonym of the genus Tritonia, in which some species of Crocosmia were once included. It was named by Alire Raffeneau Delile for Ernest Coquebert de Montbret, a fellow French botanist on Napoleon's Egyptian Campaign.

== Description ==
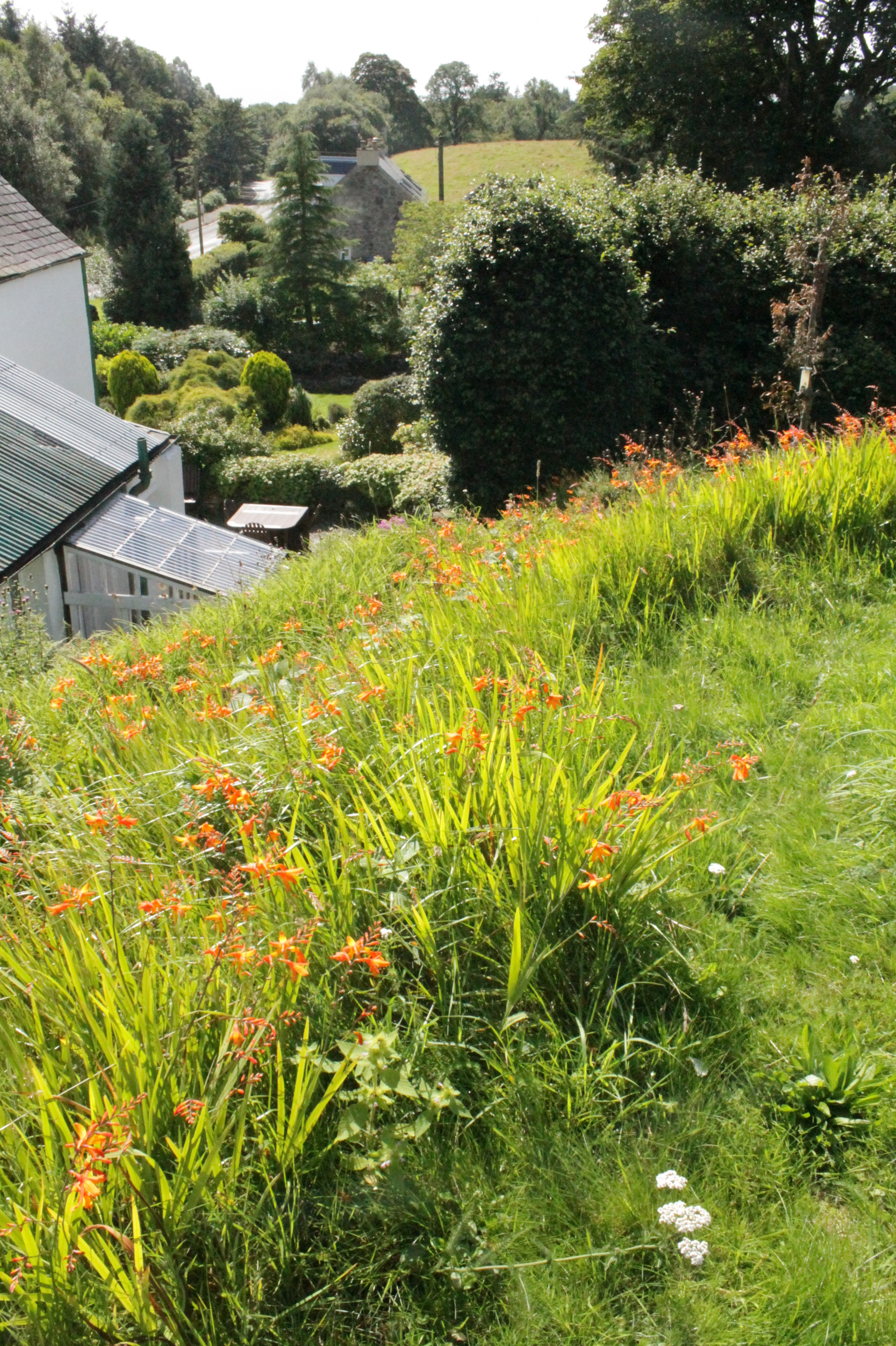
Naturalized montbretia (escaped from its original garden location)

They can be evergreen or deciduous perennials that grow from basal underground corms. The alternate leaves are cauline (stem-borne) and ensiform (sword-shaped). The blades are parallel-veined. The margin is entire. The corms form in vertical chains, with the youngest at the top, and oldest and largest buried most deeply in the soil. The roots of the lowermost corm in a chain are contractile roots and drag the corm deeper into the ground where conditions allow. The chains of corms are fragile and easily separated, a quality that has enabled some species to become invasive and difficult to control in the garden.

They have colourful inflorescences of 4 to 20 vivid red and orange alternate flowers on a horizontally divaricate (branched) stem. The terminal inflorescence can have the form of a cyme or a raceme. These flower from early summer well into autumn. The flowers are sessile on a flexuose (zigzag) arched spike. The fertile flowers are hermaphroditic. All stamens have an equal length. The style branches are apically forked. They are pollinated by insects, birds (sunbirds) or by the wind. The dehiscent capsules are shorter than they are wide.

== Species ==
Species accepted by Kew Plants of the World Online:

- Crocosmia ambongensis (H.Perrier) Goldblatt & J.C.Manning – Madagascar
- Crocosmia aurea (Pappe ex Hook.) Planch. (Falling Stars) – eastern + southern Africa from Cape Province to Sudan; naturalised in Azores
- Crocosmia × crocosmiiflora (Lemoine) N.E.Br. – South Africa; naturalised in parts of Europe, Rwanda, Zaire, Assam, Norfolk Island in Australia, Fiji, the Caribbean, Argentina, Tristan da Cunha (C. aurea × C. pottsii)
- Crocosmia fucata (Lindl.) M.P.de Vos – Kamiesberg Mountains in Cape Province of South Africa
- Crocosmia masoniorum (L.Bolus) N.E.Br. (Giant montbretia) – Cape Province, KwaZulu-Natal
- Crocosmia mathewsiana (L.Bolus) Goldblatt ex M.P.de Vos – Drakensberg Mountains in Mpumalanga
- Crocosmia paniculata (Klatt) Goldblatt (Aunt Eliza) – Lesotho, Eswatini, South Africa
- Crocosmia pearsei Oberm. – Lesotho, Free State, Drakensberg Mountains in Mpumalanga
- Crocosmia pottsii (Baker) N.E.Br. (Pott's montbretia) – Cape Province, KwaZulu-Natal

=== Garden hybrids ===
- Crocosmia × crocosmiiflora

== Cultivation ==
Crocosmias are grown worldwide, and more than 400 cultivars have been produced. Some hybrids have become invasive, especially C. × crocosmiiflora hybrids, which are invasive in the UK, Ireland, Australia, New Zealand, North Carolina, and the West Coast of the United States.

Crocosmia are winter-hardy in temperate regions. They can be propagated through division, removing offsets from the corm in spring.

24 cultivars possessed the Royal Horticultural Society's Award of Garden Merit in 2023, including:

- Crocosmia × crocosmiiflora 'Carmin Brillant' (Note: Also called 'Carmin Brilliant'.)
- Crocosmia × crocosmiiflora 'Star of the East'
- Crocosmia 'Hellfire'
- Crocosmia 'Lucifer' (Note: Once called Crocosmia × Curtonus by Alan Bloom.)
- Crocosmia 'Paul's Best Yellow'
- Crocosmia 'Severn Sunrise'

== Gallery ==
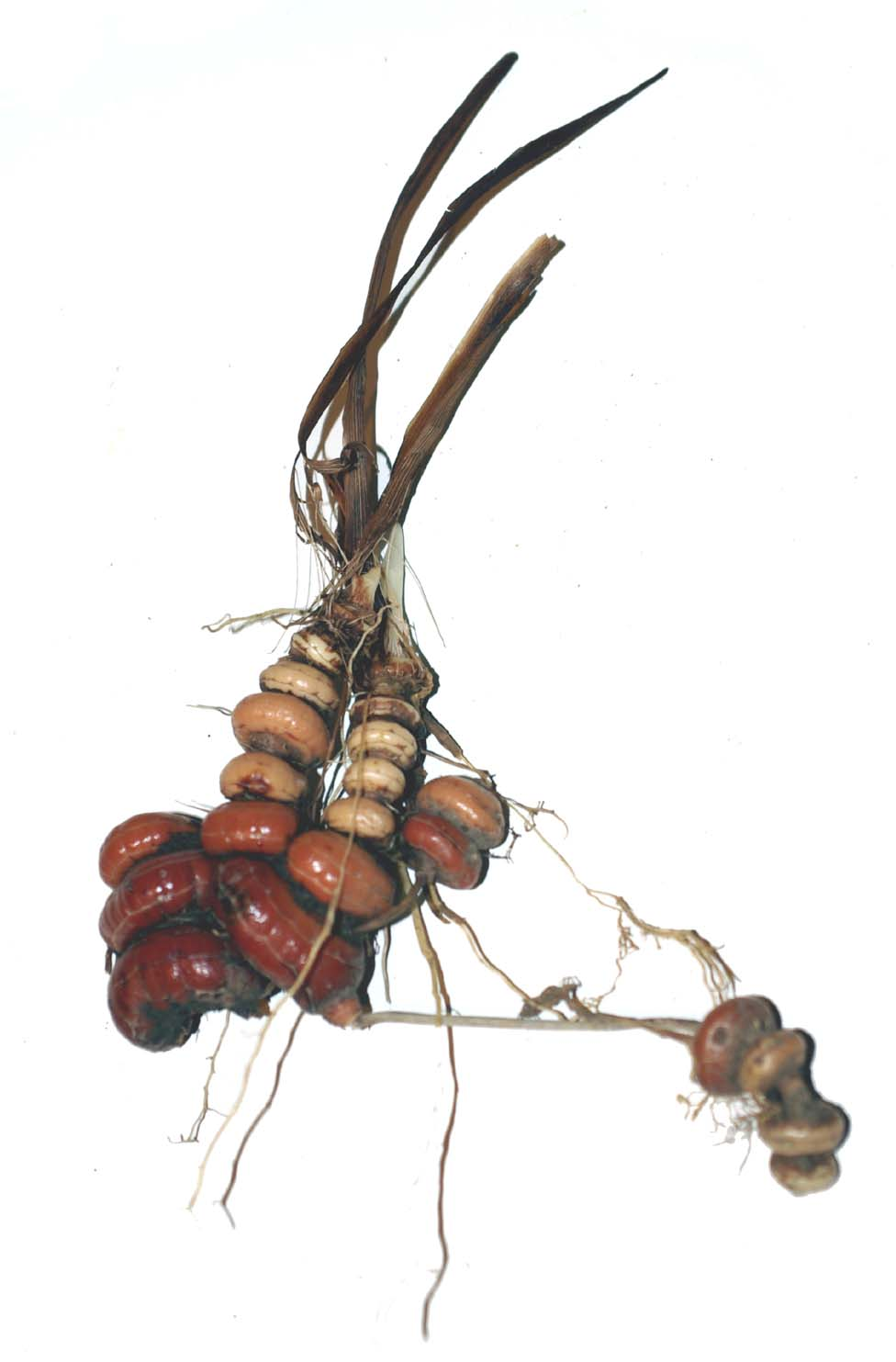
Crocosmia × crocosmiiflora corms in winter

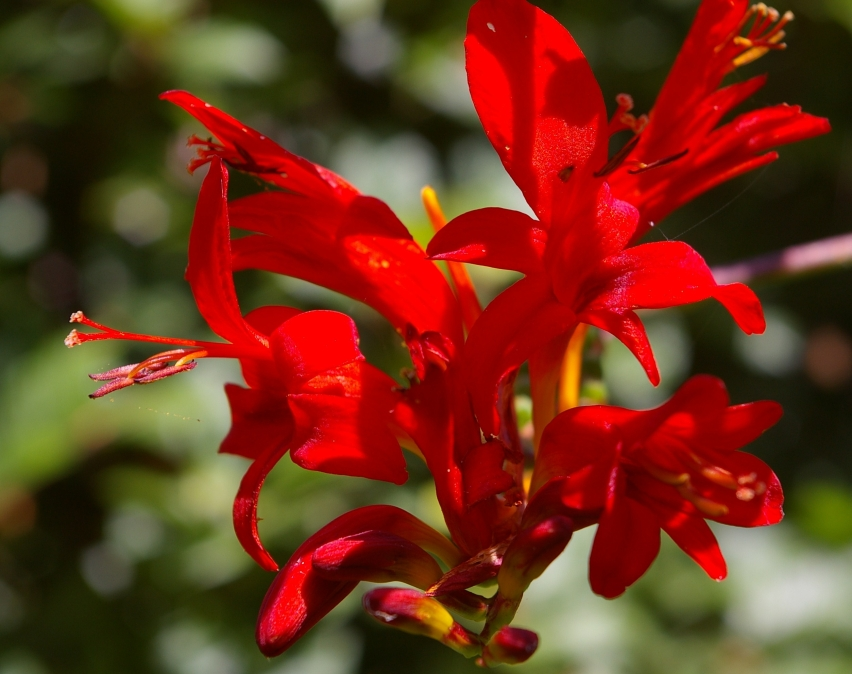
Close-up of Crocosmia 'Lucifer' in bloom

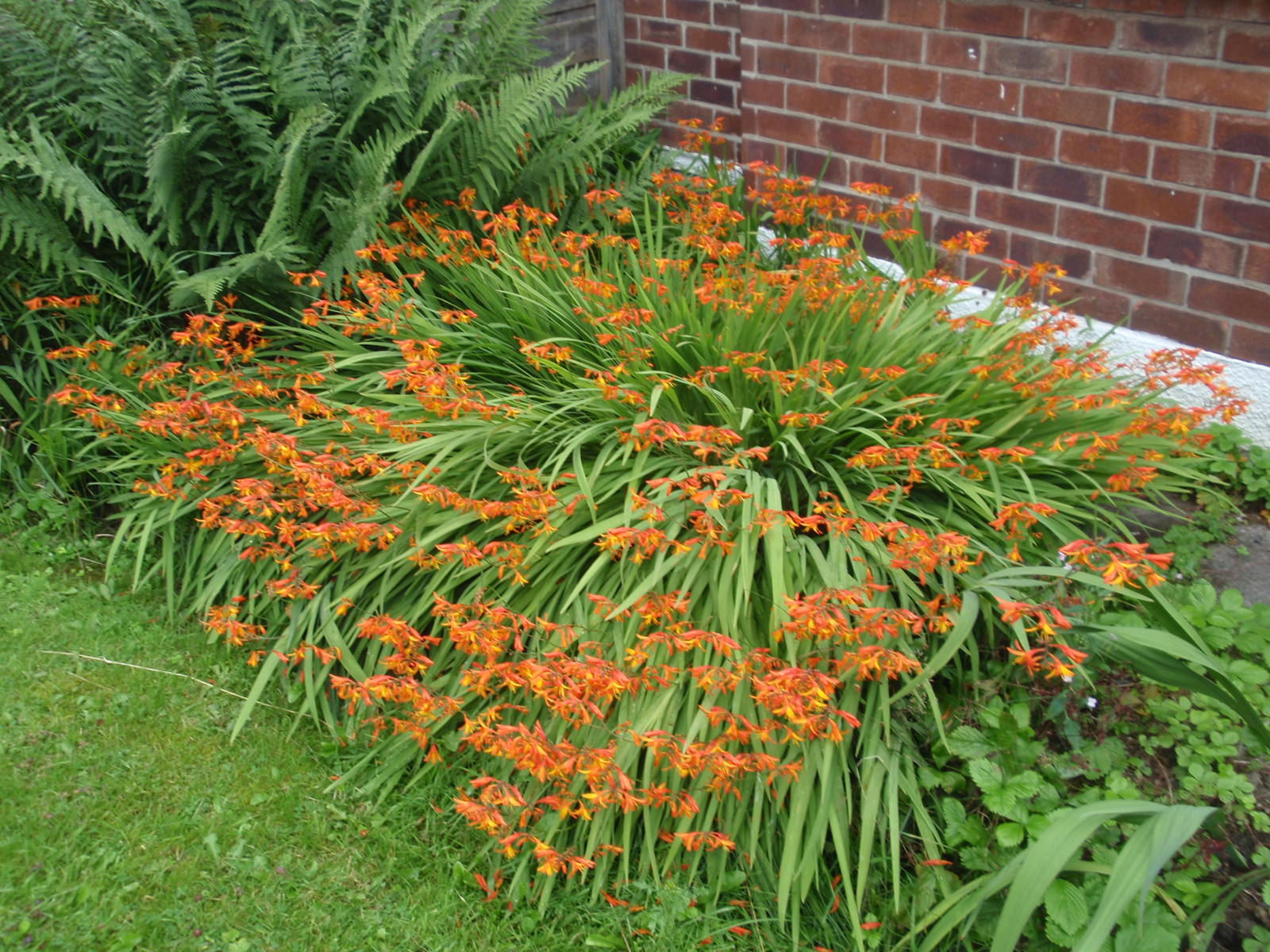
Montbretia, south Manchester, England
