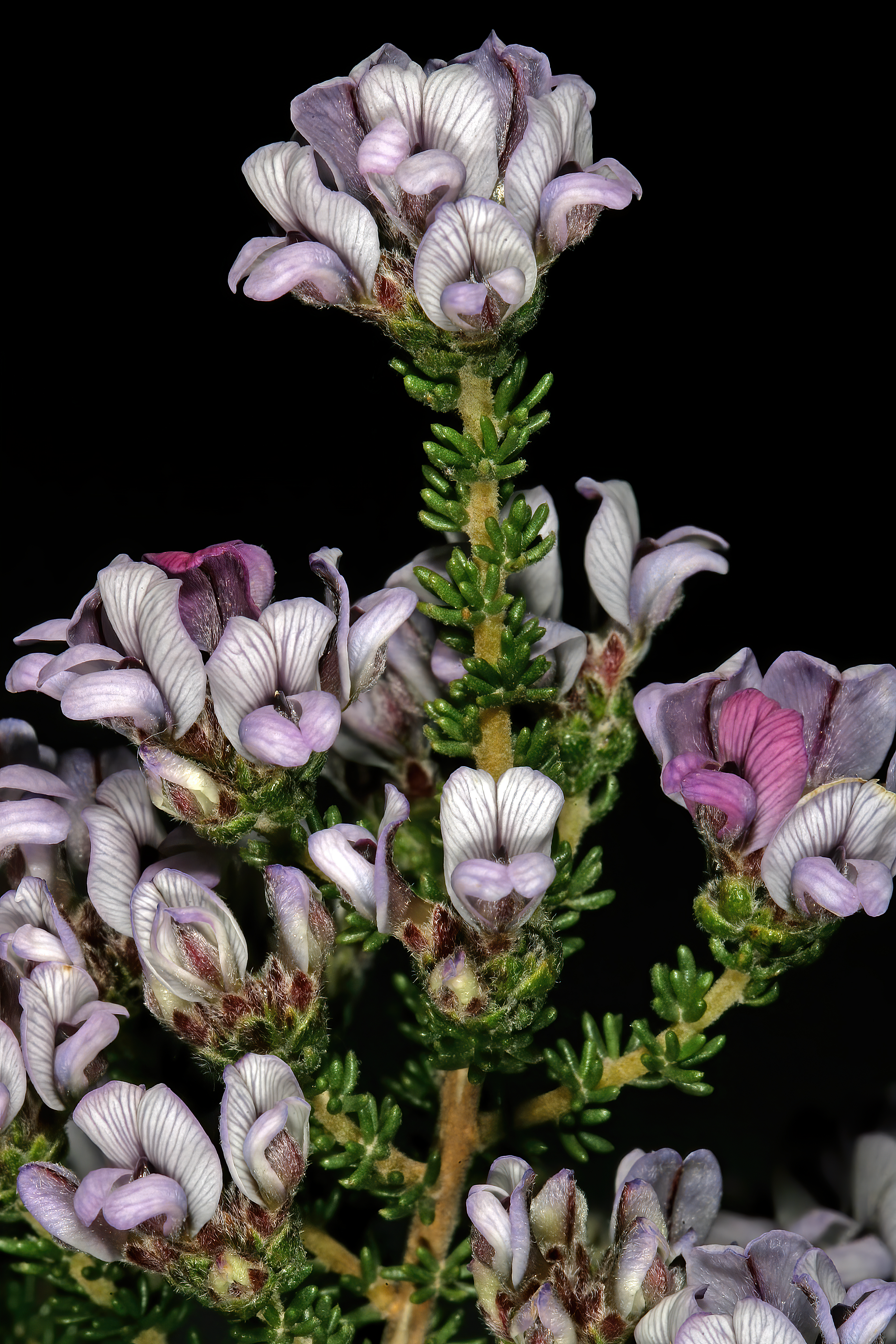

Scientific classification
- Kingdom: Plantae
- Clade: Tracheophytes
- Clade: Angiosperms
- Clade: Eudicots
- Clade: Rosids
- Order: Fabales
- Family: Fabaceae
- Subfamily: Faboideae
- Genus: Aspalathus
- Species: A. nigra

Binomial name
- Aspalathus nigra L.

Synonyms
- Achyronia nigra (L.) Kuntze; Aspalathus deciduifolia Eckl. & Zeyh.; Aspalathus globosa Steud.; Aspalathus involucrata Pappe ex Harv.; Aspalathus melanoides Eckl. & Zeyh.; Aspalathus nigrescens E.Mey.; Aspalathus pallens Eckl. & Zeyh.; Paraspalathus melanoides (Eckl. & Zeyh.) C.Presl; Paraspalathus nigra (L.) C.Presl; Paraspalathus nigrescens (E.Mey.) C.Presl; Trineuria deciduifolia (Eckl. & Zeyh.) C.Presl; Trineuria fuscescens C.Presl

= Aspalathus nigra =

Species of plant

Aspalathus nigra, the black Capegorse, is a plant belonging to the genus Aspalathus. The species is endemic to the Northern Cape and the Western Cape and is part of the fynbos. The plant occurs from the Cederberg to the Hottentots Holland Mountains and Agulhas Plain and eastwards across the Langeberg to the Outeniqua Mountains and Uniondale. The population is stable.
