= Carl Ferdinand Heinrich von Ludwig =

German natural history collector

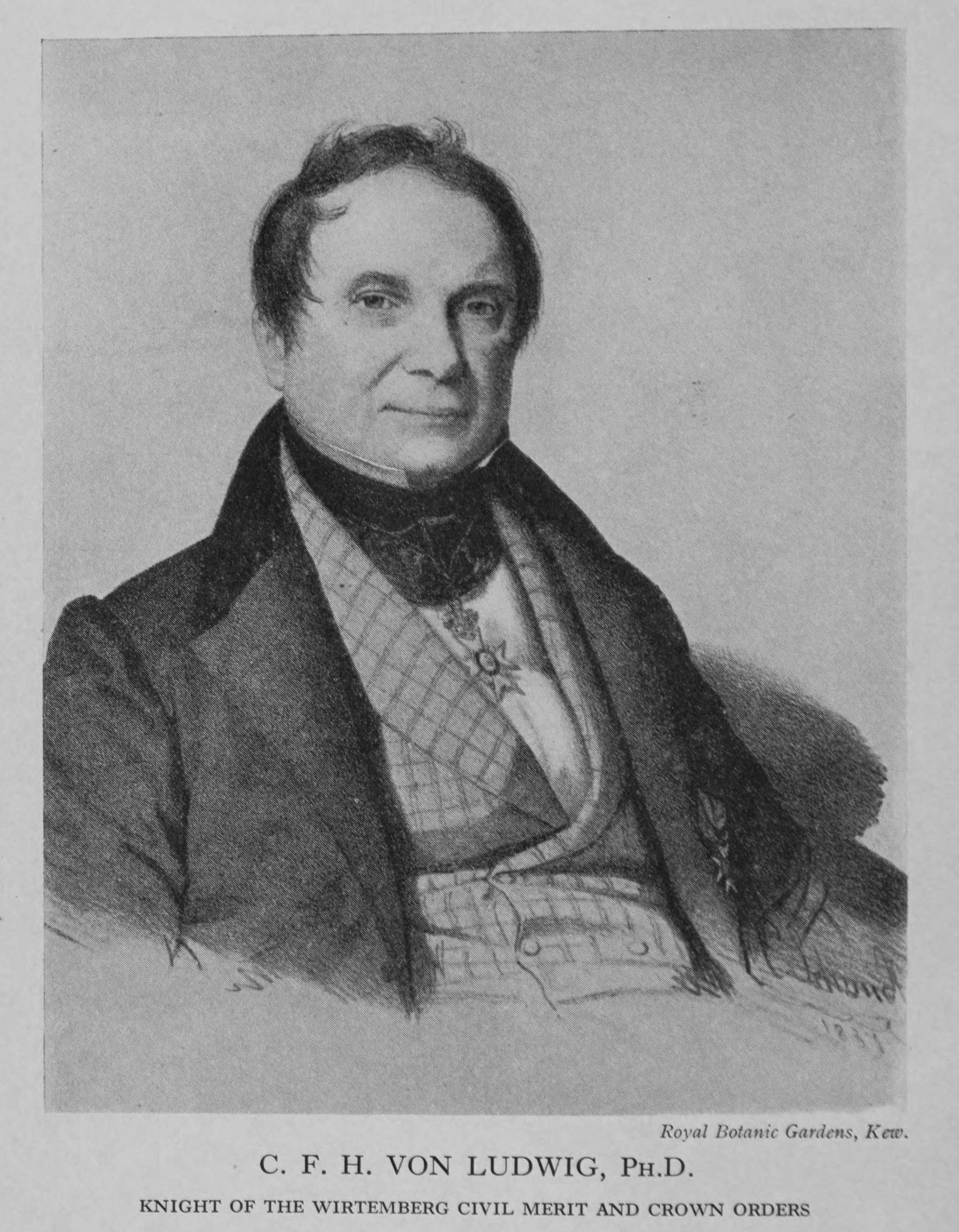

Carl Ferdinand Heinrich von Ludwig aka Baron von Ludwig (6 October 1784 Sulz am Neckar – 27 December 1847 Cape Town), the son of a clerk in the ecclesiastical administration, he was a German-born pharmacist, businessman and patron of the natural sciences, noted for having started Cape Town's first botanic garden.

== Biography ==
=== Pharmacy career ===
Ludwig served his pharmacy apprenticeship at Kirchheim near Stuttgart from where he went on to work in Amsterdam, first as apothecary and later as technician in a chemical laboratory . In 1805 he responded to an advertisement in an Amsterdam newspaper and applied for a post as pharmacy assistant to a certain Stuttgart-born Dr Liesching of Cape Town. Friedrich Ludwig Liesching was a former physician to the Württemberg regiment at the Cape. Ludwig's application was accepted and he sailed for the Cape in October 1805. His qualifications as pharmacist were approved in 1807 by a body set up to scrutinise the Cape medical and apothecary fraternities. Ludwig was regarded as a physician.

=== Business interests ===
In January 1816 Ludwig married Alida Maria Burgers, widow of Carl Ferdinand Heinrich Altenstaedt. She had inherited a stately dwelling in St. George's Street, and a small but lucrative business from her husband who had been a brewer, and a tobacco and snuff merchant. The business continued to thrive and Ludwig became one of the notables of the Cape community, in 1824 helping to found the South African Literary Society. The success of the business afforded him ample leisure time, so that he could indulge in his other interest, the collection of natural history specimens. Ludwig Beil, the Cape Town organist, accompanied him on a collecting trip to Swellendam in 1826. That same year he shipped a collection of plants and insects to the Stuttgart Royal Museum, in recognition of which he was awarded a Knighthood of the Order of the Royal Crown of Württemberg, which entitled him to place the prefix 'von' in front of his surname. He took a larger collection of plants, insects, birds and mammals with him on an 1828 visit to Germany; for this he received an honorary Ph.D. from the University of Tübingen.

=== Botanical garden ===
On his return from Europe, Von Ludwig bought about 3 acres of land in Kloof Street, Cape Town, and over the next couple of years planted the groundwork of a botanic garden. Besides large numbers of trees, shrubs and bulbs from Europe, America and Australia, he also included fruit trees, vegetables and crop plants. He introduced the jacaranda tree to South Africa. Many of the species were indigenous, some acquired from Ecklon and Zeyher. The Irish botanist, Harvey, noted his appreciation of the easy access that was provided for studying the plants. Other prominent scientists such as Charles Bunbury and Joseph Dalton Hooker visited what had become known as Ludwigsburg Garden, while Lady Jane Franklin, who explored the garden in 1836, noted that even though only 3 acres in extent 'being well laid out with numerous divisions and paths' made it appear larger. The astronomer John Herschel used a camera lucida to sketch the developing site in 1834 (see drawing above). A certain Leibold was first superintendent of the garden from 1834 to 1837, followed by James Bowie over the period 1838–42, and Thomas Draper 1843-47 until Ludwig's death. The botanist Ludwig Pappe, later Colonial Botanist, prepared herbarium specimens from the garden plants.

=== Cape explorations ===
Von Ludwig made few long journeys exploring the Cape. In 1834 he and his wife visited Oudtshoorn, the nearby Cango Caves and the coastal town of Knysna, staying with the enigmatic George Rex. Ludwig did however support the idea of exploring the interior and played an active role in the 'Cape of Good Hope Association for exploring Central Africa'. From Ecklon he acquired a collection of insects, from Andrew Smith he obtained rare birds, and plant specimens from Zeyher and Drège. His collections continued to be shipped to Stuttgart and Frankfurt, and he sent Cape bulbs and seeds to various organisations such as the Massachusetts Horticultural Society. In recognition of these contributions Curtis's Botanical Magazine dedicated an issue to him (Vol.62 of 1835) as was Harvey's 1838 Genera of South African Plants.

=== European visit ===
In 1836 or 1837 Von Ludwig again visited Europe and presented large collections of natural history items to various scientific organisations. Tübingen conferred an honorary M.D., Stuttgart granted freedom of the city, while the King of Württemberg elevated him to the nobility with the hereditary title of 'Freiherr' (Baron), made him a Knight Commander of the Royal Crown of Württemberg and presented him with a snuffbox 'richly set with diamonds'. While in Stuttgart he contacted Ferdinand Krauss, who had also started his career as an apothecary's apprentice, inviting him to the Cape. Since he had corresponded with him, he also visited William Jackson Hooker in Glasgow.

=== South African journey ===
In February 1838 Baron von Ludwig and his daughters left Portsmouth, together with Krauss who had agreed to go to South Africa. Their boat arrived in Table Bay on 7 May 1838. Krauss stayed with Von Ludwig for seven months, preparing for his trip eastwards. The hospitality Von Ludwig displayed to passing scientists and collectors was legendary - Joseph Burke had stayed with him when he arrived at the Cape in 1840. Von Ludwig supported the cause of the Voortrekkers and on various occasions sent them boxes of vegetable seeds acquired from Germany and the Netherlands.

Von Ludwig continued with his active role in Cape affairs - he joined the committee of the Cape of Good Hope Agricultural Society in 1836 and that of the South African Public Library in 1843. He played a leading part in the founding of the Natal Cotton Company, the Cape of Good Hope Gaslight Company in 1845 and erecting a gasworks.

=== South African Mining Company ===
Rich copper deposits were known to exist in Namaqualand since the days of Cape governor Simon van der Stel in 1685, but had received little attention because of the remoteness of the location and its severe conditions. Between 1836 and 1837 the English explorer Sir James Alexander launched an expedition to Namaqualand, sponsored by the Royal Geographical Society. A year later he attempted extraction of copper in the area but abandoned the operation due to logistical problems. Alexander's failed attempts reawakened interest in the possibility of mining. The South African Mining Company, the country's first mining company, was founded on 21 March 1846, with Baron von Ludwig as chairman, and a total of nine directors, all leading Cape Town businessmen. The location the company intended to mine was at 28° 40′ S, 17° 8′ E. Rich copper ore was found at the site, but a general reluctance by shareholders to fund a project that was not producing immediate profit, led to the company's eventual demise.

=== Legacy ===
After Baron von Ludwig's death his garden was offered for sale to the Colonial Government, but the offer was declined, though a few plants were bought for the so-called official Botanic Garden which had not been developed and was in a state of neglect. Various horticulturalists, such as Thomas Draper and Carl Zeyher were employed, but either resigned or were discharged due to differences with the Botanic Garden Committee who were bent on profit.

Von Ludwig is commemorated in the plant species names Restio ludwigii, Tulbaghia ludwigiana, Hibiscus ludwigii and Hypoxis ludwigii. Among birds, Ludwig's bustard and the common square-tailed drongo (Dicrurus ludwigii) carry his name.

=== Coats of arms ===
Von Ludwig used at least two coats of arms.

A bookplate, identifying him as 'C.F.H. von Ludwig Phil Dr', shows the arms as a quartered shield. The first quarter shows a wheatsheaf on a golden field, the second a silver fleur de lis on a blue field, the third a crescent moon on a red field, and the fourth a rampant red lion on gold. Evidently this bookplate dates from between 1828 (when he was awarded the doctorate) and 1837 (when he was created a baron).

New arms were granted to him together with the barony in 1837. They too were quartered, the first and fourth quarters showing a golden wheatsheaf on a blue background, and the second and third a silver fleur de lis on red.

=== Related articles ===
- List of natural history dealers
