= Crocosmia ambongensis =

Scientific classification
- Kingdom: Plantae
- Clade: Tracheophytes
- Clade: Angiosperms
- Clade: Monocots
- Order: Asparagales
- Family: Iridaceae
- Genus: Crocosmia
- Species: C. ambongensis

Binomial name
- Crocosmia ambongensis (H.Perrier) Goldblatt & J.C.Manning, (1990)

Synonyms
- Geissorhiza ambongensis H.Perrier

Species of flowering plant

Crocosmia ambongensis, the Madagascan montbretia, is a perennial flowering plant that is part of the Iridaceae family. The species is endemic to Madagascar.
