= Crocosmia pearsei =

Scientific classification
- Kingdom: Plantae
- Clade: Tracheophytes
- Clade: Angiosperms
- Clade: Monocots
- Order: Asparagales
- Family: Iridaceae
- Genus: Crocosmia
- Species: C. pearsei

Binomial name
- Crocosmia pearsei Oberm., (1981)

Species of flowering plant

Crocosmia pearsei is a perennial flowering plant that is part of the Iridaceae family. The species is native to KwaZulu-Natal, Lesotho and the Free State and occurs at Cathedral Peak and Mont-aux-Sources. The plant is part of the grassland at high altitudes. The species has no threats and is considered rare.
