= Crocosmia fucata =

Scientific classification
- Kingdom: Plantae
- Clade: Tracheophytes
- Clade: Angiosperms
- Clade: Monocots
- Order: Asparagales
- Family: Iridaceae
- Genus: Crocosmia
- Species: C. fucata

Binomial name
- Crocosmia fucata (Herb.) M.P.de Vos, (1984)

Synonyms
- Antholyza fucata (Lindl.) Baker; Chasmanthe fucata (Lindl.) N.E.Br.; Montbretia fucata (Lindl.) Heynh.; Petamenes fucata (Lindl.) E.Phillips; Tritonia fucata Lindl.; Waitzia fucata (Lindl.) Heynh.

Species of flowering plant

Crocosmia fucata is a perennial flowering plant that is part of the Iridaceae family. The species is endemic to the Northern Cape and occurs north on the Kamiesberge, at Sneeukop. Here there is only one population along a seasonal stream. The species is threatened by overgrazing and trampling by livestock. The species is part of the fynbos.
