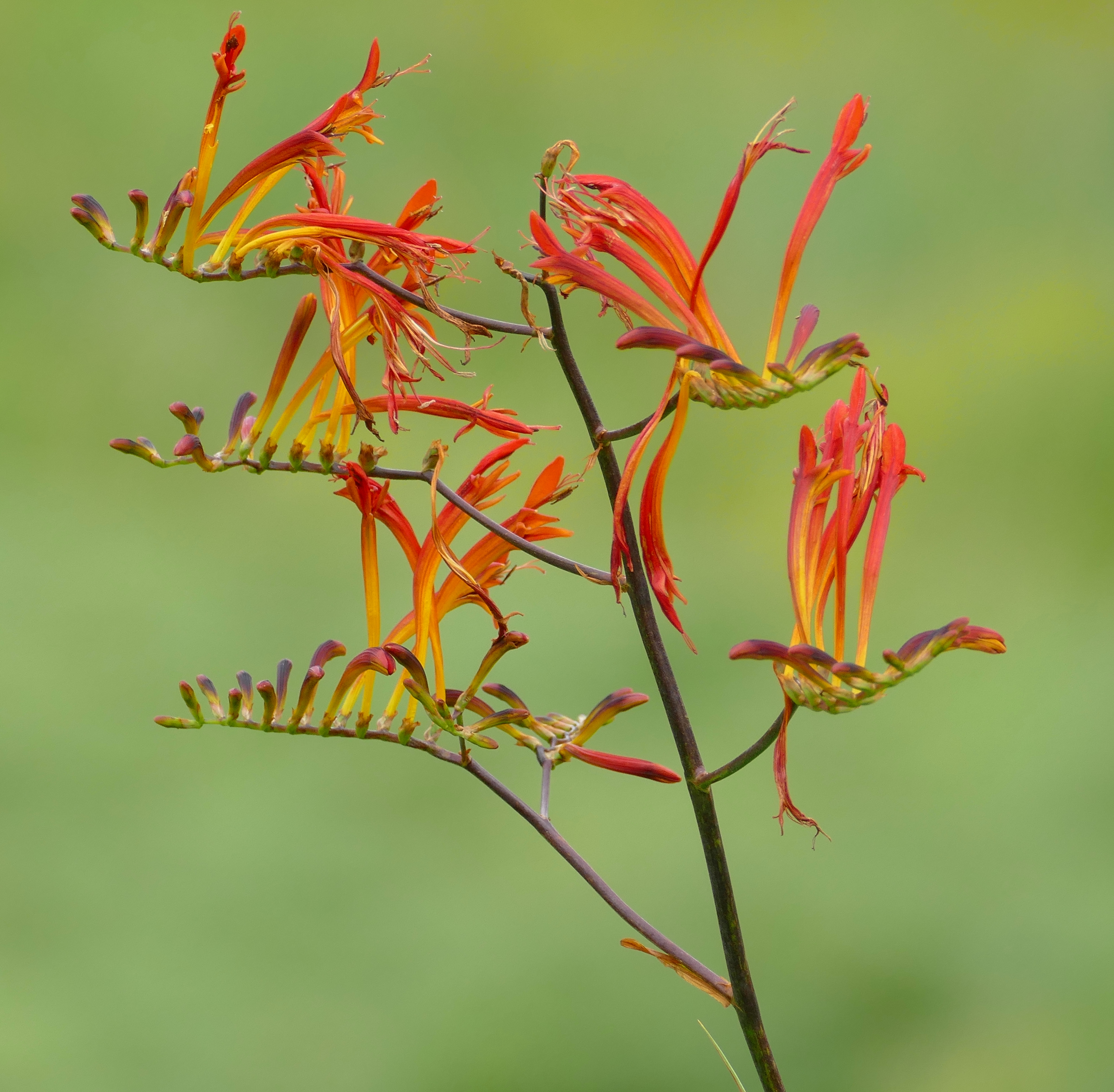

Scientific classification
- Kingdom: Plantae
- Clade: Tracheophytes
- Clade: Angiosperms
- Clade: Monocots
- Order: Asparagales
- Family: Iridaceae
- Genus: Crocosmia
- Species: C. paniculata

Binomial name
- Crocosmia paniculata (Klatt) Goldblatt

Synonyms
- Antholyza paniculata Klatt; Curtonus paniculatus (Klatt) N.E.Br.

= Crocosmia paniculata =

Species of flowering plant

Crocosmia paniculata is a bulbous flowering plant that is native to eastern South Africa, Lesotho, and Eswatini, growing in wet areas by streams, marshes, and drainages. Plants reach 4 to 5 ft (1.2–1.5 m) tall, with lanceolate leaves and deep orange to orange-brown flowers. It is a popular ornamental plant.

The plant has escaped cultivation and become established in the wild in parts of the United Kingdom.

The common name Aunt Eliza is derived from the former generic name Antholyza.

In Lesotho, where it is native, the plant is used by the indigenous Sotho people as an antidiarrhoeal remedy, administered not only to humans, but also to cattle so afflicted.
