= Crocosmia mathewsiana =

Scientific classification
- Kingdom: Plantae
- Clade: Tracheophytes
- Clade: Angiosperms
- Clade: Monocots
- Order: Asparagales
- Family: Iridaceae
- Genus: Crocosmia
- Species: C. mathewsiana

Binomial name
- Crocosmia mathewsiana (L.Bolus) Goldblatt, (1984)

Synonyms
- Tritonia mathewsiana L.Bolus

Species of flowering plant

Crocosmia mathewsiana is a perennial flowering plant that is part of the Iridaceae family. The species is endemic to Mpumalanga and occurs on the Drakensberg escarpment, from Mariepskop to Mac-Mac. The plant has a range of 194 km^{2} and is threatened by invasive species.
