= Phrydiuchus tau =

Scientific classification
- Domain: Eukaryota
- Kingdom: Animalia
- Phylum: Arthropoda
- Class: Insecta
- Order: Coleoptera
- Suborder: Polyphaga
- Infraorder: Cucujiformia
- Family: Curculionidae
- Genus: Phrydiuchus
- Species: P. tau

Binomial name
- Phrydiuchus tau Warner, 1969

Species of beetle

Phrydiuchus tau is a species of true weevils known as the Mediterranean sage root weevil. It is used as an agent of biological pest control against noxious weed Mediterranean sage (Salvia aethiopis).

The adult weevil is dark gray to black and has a marking on its back that looks like a white letter T, or tau, hence its scientific name. The weevil is about 5 millimeters long. The female lays eggs at the base or on the underside of the leaf. The larva emerges in three to four weeks and burrows into the plant tissue. It tunnels all the way down to the root crown where it feeds and develops. The adult weevil does feed on the foliage, but most of the damage to the plant is done by the larva's feeding activity. Small plants can be killed by just the larval damage; larger plants may be stunted or unable to reproduce. The weevil favors Mediterranean sage, but it will also readily attack clary sage (Salvia sclarea), a similar but less troublesome weed in the area.

This weevil is native to southern Eurasia. It was first introduced to the United States for invasive sage biocontrol in 1971. It is now established in much of the western United States.
