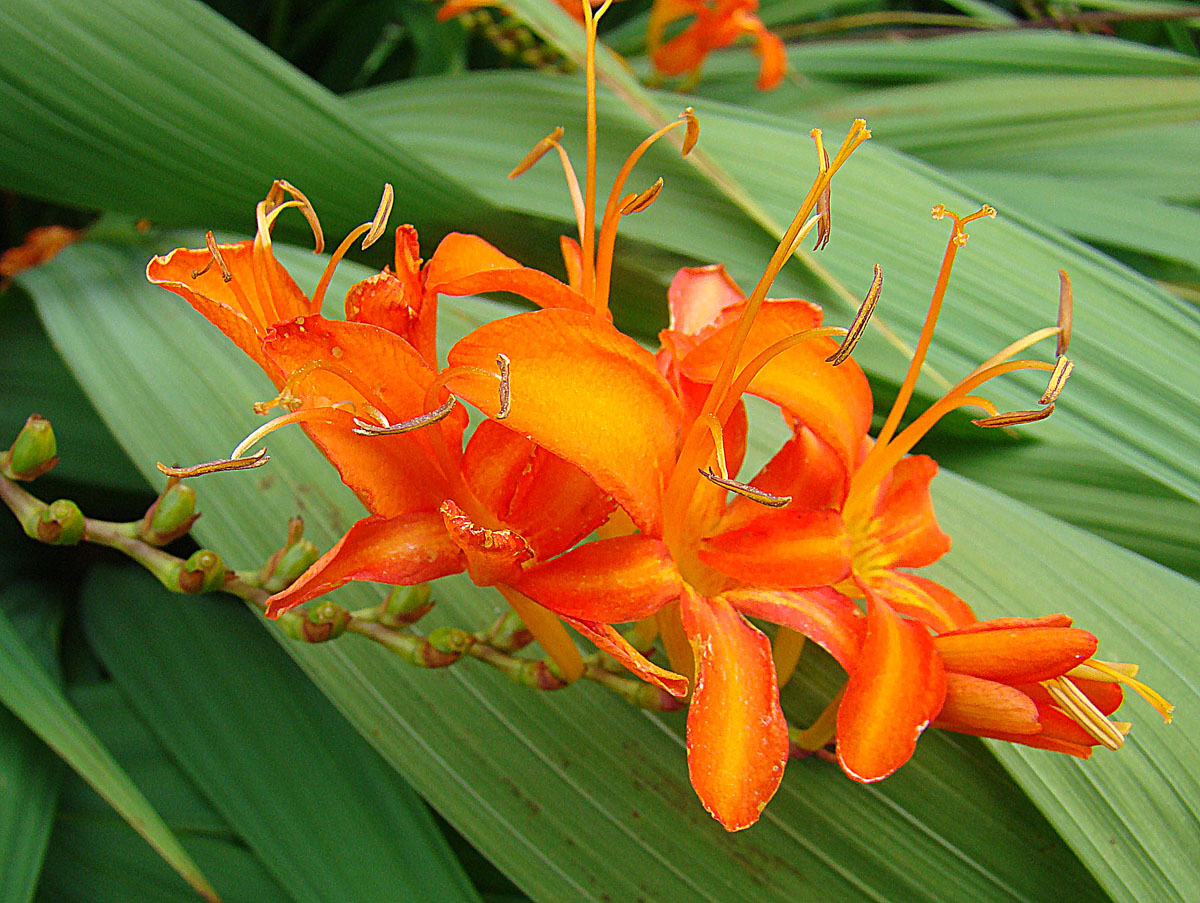
- Flowers

Scientific classification
- Kingdom: Plantae
- Clade: Tracheophytes
- Clade: Angiosperms
- Clade: Monocots
- Order: Asparagales
- Family: Iridaceae
- Genus: Crocosmia
- Species: C. masoniorum

Binomial name
- Crocosmia masoniorum (L.Bolus) N.E.Br.

Synonyms
- Tritonia masoniorum L.Bolus

= Crocosmia masoniorum =

Species of flowering plant

Crocosmia masoniorum, called the giant montbretia, is a species of flowering plant in the genus Crocosmia, native to the eastern Cape Provinces of South Africa. It has gained the Royal Horticultural Society's Award of Garden Merit.
