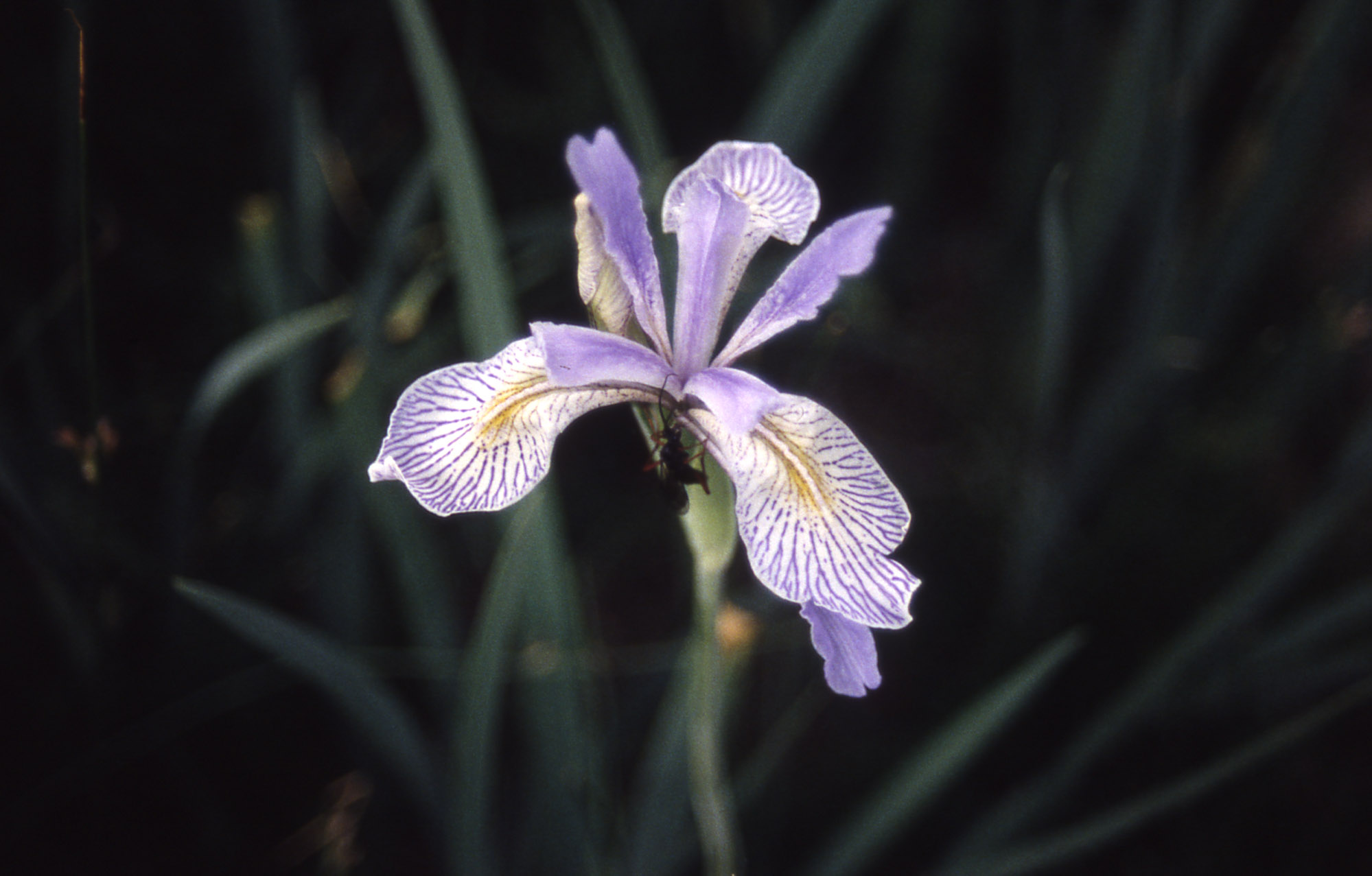
- Iris missouriensis

Scientific classification
- Kingdom: Plantae
- Clade: Tracheophytes
- Clade: Angiosperms
- Clade: Monocots
- Order: Asparagales
- Family: Iridaceae
- Genus: Iris
- Subgenus: Iris subg. Limniris
- Section: Iris sect. Limniris
- Series: Iris ser. Longipetalae

Species
- Iris longipetala; Iris missouriensis

= Iris ser. Longipetalae =

Group of flowering plants

Iris ser. Longipetalae is a series of the genus Iris, in Iris subg. Limniris.

William Rickatson Dykes in his book 'Handbook of Garden Irises' (of 1924) includes 4 species in his Iris longipetala subsection; including Iris longipetala (Herbert), Iris missouriensis Nuttall, Iris arizonica (Dykes, 1917) and Iris montana (Nuttall). Iris arizonica and Iris montana have since been classified as synonyms of Iris missouriensis.

The series was then first classified as a 'series' by Diels in 'Die Natürlichen Pflanzenfamilien' (Edited by H. G. A. Engler and K. Prantl) in 1930. It was further expanded by Lawrence in Gentes Herb (written in Dutch) in 1953.

There is still a lot of confusion within the series.

The British Iris Society only lists Iris missouriensis and classes Iris longipetala as a variant of Iris missouriensis. The American Iris Society and Pacific Iris Society lists three species; Iris longipetala (Herbert), Iris missouriensis (Nuttall) and Iris pariensis (Welsh). But Plant List regards Iris pariensis as a synonym of Iris missouriensis. Iris pariensis was found by Stanley Larson Welsh in Utah and published in 'Great Basin Naturalist' 46(2): 256 in 1986.

The series has species are native to western North America, seen in Washington (state), Oregon and California.

They prefer to have moisture in the spring and a dry period during the summer. They also do not like root disturbance hence they are difficult to grow as nursery plants. They are also rarely grown in the UK. The species have thick rhizomes, fruiting stems (that follow the flowers) that stay on the plant until the next growing season, (or longer) a stigma with 2 teeth (or lobes) and seed capsules with 6 ribs and taper into points on the ends.

Image	Scientific name	Distribution
	Iris longipetala Herbert	California
	Iris missouriensis Nuttall	United States (Arizona, California, Colorado, Idaho, Montana, Nebraska, Nevada, New Mexico, North Dakota, Oregon, South Dakota, Utah, Washington, and Wyoming), Canada (British Columbia and Alberta)
