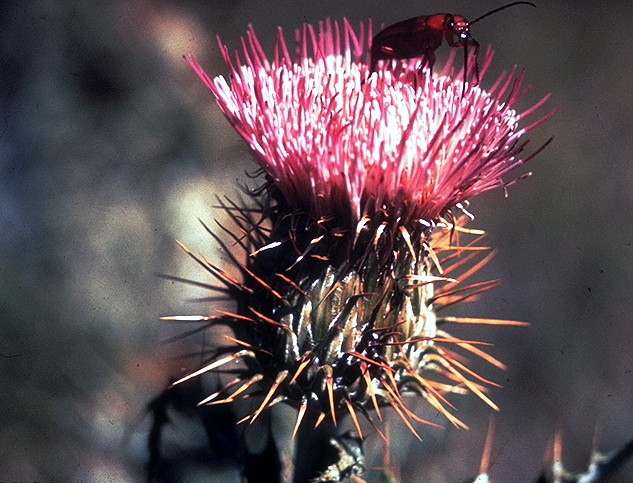

Conservation status
- Secure (NatureServe)

Scientific classification
- Kingdom: Plantae
- Clade: Tracheophytes
- Clade: Angiosperms
- Clade: Eudicots
- Clade: Asterids
- Order: Asterales
- Family: Asteraceae
- Genus: Cirsium
- Species: C. ochrocentrum

Binomial name
- Cirsium ochrocentrum A.Gray

Synonyms
- Carduus ochrocentrus (A.Gray) Greene; Cnicus ochrocentrus (A.Gray) A.Gray; Cnicus undulatus var. ochrocentrus (A.Gray) A.Gray

= Cirsium ochrocentrum =

Species of thistle

Cirsium ochrocentrum is a species of thistle known by the common name yellowspine thistle. It is native to the Great Plains of the Central United States and to the desert regions of the western United States and northern Mexico. Its range extends from eastern Oregon east to the Black Hills of South Dakota, south as far as the Mexican State of Durango.

== Description ==
The plant is a perennial herb growing up to 1 metre (3.3 ft) tall, with one to twenty white woolly stems per plant.

The leaves are generally deeply lobed and the lobes cut into sharp teeth. The longest leaves at the base of the plant are up to about 25 centimeters (10 inches) long. The leaves are spiny, with spines up to 1.5 centimeters long.

The inflorescence consists of several flower heads, each lined with hard, toothed phyllaries tipped with spines. The head contains white, pink, or lavender disc florets but no ray florets.

The fruit is an achene with a brown body nearly a centimeter long topped with a pappus which may be 3 centimeters long.

Varieties

- Cirsium ochrocentrum var. martinii (Barlow-Irick) D.J.Keil – Mexico, Arizona, New Mexico
- Cirsium ochrocentrum var. ochrocentrum – United States

== Uses ==
Among the Zuni people, an infusion of the plant taken by both partners as a contraceptive. An infusion of whole plant is also taken as a diaphoretic, diuretic, and emetic to treat syphilis. An infusion of the fresh or dried root is taken three times a day for diabetes.

It is a weed in California and Northwestern Mexico. It grows in fields and disturbed areas such as roadsides.
