= Vadim Pappe =

Russian historian

Vadim Pappé
- Born: 17 April 1942; Moscow, Russian SFSR, Soviet Union
- Disappeared: June 2012 (aged 70); Moscow Oblast, Russian Federation
- Status: Missing for 13 years and 8 or 9 months
- Citizenship: Soviet (1942–1991) Russian (1991–2012)
- Occupations: Art and dance historian and author

Vadim Mikhailovich Pappé (Russian: Вади́м Миха́йлович Паппе́, German: Wadim Pappé; born 17 April 1942) was a Russian art and dance historian and author.

== Background ==
Born in Moscow into a family of musicians and performers of French (Alsatian) origin. He graduated from the Moscow Art Theatre School, specializing in set design. He worked at the Museum of the Moscow Art Theatre and in 1976 became a senior editor of The Great Russian Encyclopedia (The Great Soviet Encyclopedia until 1991).

== Disappearance ==
Pappé's fate is unknown. He was last seen leaving his workplace in June 2012, aged 70, and is believed to have been murdered in the Moscow area..

== Works ==
Pappé is the author of hundreds of articles on art, architecture, dance, ballet dancers, theater and film, history of ballet and wrote the "Ballet", "Russian Ballet" and "Russian Dramatic Theatre" entries in the Great Russian Encyclopedia, Cinema: An Encyclopedic Dictionary, and other reference works and periodicals. Many of the articles were illustrated with his own photographs.

Author of the book "2500 Twentieth-Century Choreography Premiers: 1900–1945" (coauthor V. Kulakov, Moscow, Deka-VS, 2008).

== See also ==
- List of people who disappeared mysteriously (2000–present)

== Bibliography ==
- V.M.Pappé, V.A.Kulakov "2500 Twentieth-Century Choreography Premiers: 1900-1945" (Google Books, in Russian)
- "2500 Twentieth-Century Choreography Premiers: 1900-1945" (in library catalogs)
- V.M. Pappé. "Ballet and Dance in Cinema". // Cinema: Encyclopedic Dictionary — Moscow: Soviet Encyclopedia, 1987. — 640 p. (in Russian)
- V.M. Pappé. "Opera in Cinema" // Cinema: Encyclopedic Dictionary — Moscow: Soviet Encyclopedia, 1987. — 640 p. (in Russian)
- V.M. Pappé. "Opera" // Cinema: Encyclopedic Dictionary — Moscow: Soviet Encyclopedia, 1987. — 640 p. (in Russian)
