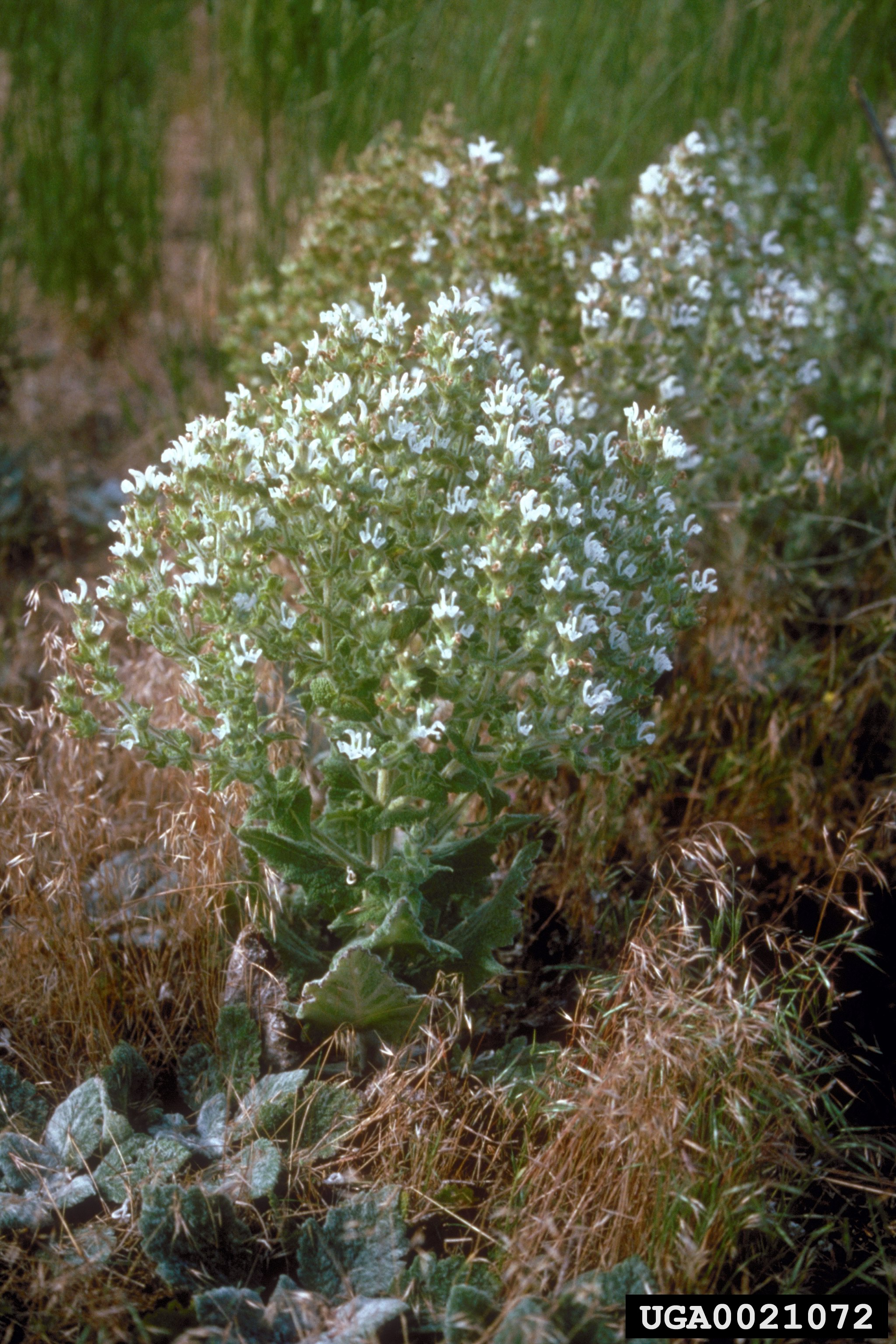

Scientific classification
- Kingdom: Plantae
- Clade: Tracheophytes
- Clade: Angiosperms
- Clade: Eudicots
- Clade: Asterids
- Order: Lamiales
- Family: Lamiaceae
- Genus: Salvia
- Species: S. aethiopis

Binomial name
- Salvia aethiopis L.

Synonyms
- List: Aethiopis vera Fourr.; Salvia idanensis Gand.; Salvia kochiana Kunze; Salvia lanata Stokes; Salvia leuconeura Boiss.; Sclarea aethiopis (L.) Mill.; Sclarea lanata Moench

= Salvia aethiopis =

Plant species in the mint family

Salvia aethiopis is a species of perennial plant known by the common names Mediterranean sage or African sage. It is best known as a noxious weed, particularly in the western United States. It is native to Eurasia and was probably introduced to North America as a contaminant of alfalfa seed. It is a weed of rangelands and pastures. It is unpalatable to livestock, it disrupts native floral communities, and it becomes a physical nuisance due to the similarity of the persistent dried stems to tumbleweed. The weevil Phrydiuchus tau is used as an agent of biological pest control on this plant.

Boya and Valverde examined a sample of Salvia aethiopis. Acetone extracts of the root furnished a new orthoquinone diterpene, aethiopinone (4,5-seco-5,10-friedo-abieta-4(18),5,6,8,13-pentaen-11,12-dione). This compound was isolated in 0.15% yield from the dry roots.

Chemical structure of aethiopinone

== Control ==
S. aethiopis may be easily controlled mechanically and chemically. It can also be biologically controlled with Phrydiuchus tau, a weevil.
