= Agri-Expo =

South African agriculture promoter

- Formerly: Cape of Good Hope Agricultural Society
- Industry: Marketing
- Founded: November 1831; 195 years ago in Cape Town, Cape Colony
- Founder: Michiel van Breda
- Headquarters: Cape Town, South Africa
- Area served: Western Cape
- Key people: Breyton Milford (CEO)
- Number of employees: 4 (2023)
- Website: agriexpo.co.za

Agri-Expo is a South African company that performs marketing services to promote the South African agricultural industry in the Western Cape. The organisation was founded in the Cape Colony as the Cape of Good Hope Agricultural Society in 1831, making it the oldest agricultural society in South Africa and Africa.

The company promotes the agricultural industry through the organising of agricultural shows and food competitions. The company currently hosts the annual South African Dairy Championship and the South African Young Wine Show. It formerly hosted more shows, including the South African Cheese Festival, and the Agri-Expo Livestock show, but a restructuring in 2023 led to the company cancelling many of their events and retrenching 10 of their 14 staff members.

== History ==
The Cape of Good Hope Agricultural Society was founded in November 1831 by Cape Town farmer and politician Michiel van Breda. On 1 December of that year, the society placed a notice in the government gazette of the Cape Colony advertising a livestock trading fair to take place on 22 December. In 1832, the society established branches in Stellenbosch, Swellendam, Tulbagh, and Worcester.

By 1837, the society had grown to 156 members, an increase of 24 members from the previous year.

In February 1832, the Cape of Good Hope Agricultural Society started collecting money for a prize to offer to a farmer who submitted the best sample of Madeira wine. In June 1833, a wine farmer named J.J. Marais was awarded the prize of 100 Rixdollars and a trophy for submitting the best Madeira wine. The trophy was handed over by Sir John Wylde, Chief Justice of the Cape Colony.

In 1836, the society presented a cup to a merchant, Captain Robb, for his services in importing Angora goats and sheep.

The Cape of Good Hope Agricultural Society played a role in promoting the mechanisation of the agricultural industry in the Cape Colony in the 1850s. However, agricultural machinery was not widely adopted by Cape farmers.

In 1952, the society established the General Smuts Trophy for the best South African wine of the year. The trophy is named in honour of Jan Smuts. As of 2023, the General Smuts Trophy is still awarded as part of the South African Young Wine Show.

In 1996, the society started trading as Agri-Expo. In 2002, Agri-Expo hosted the inaugural South African Cheese Festival. The first event drew 3,000 people and by 2011, the festival had to limit ticket sales to 10,000 per day over three days according to Agri-Expo's CEO. Agri-Expo sold the Cheese Festival to a consortium of private investors in May 2023.

In 2021, Agri-Expo celebrated its 190th anniversary. Princess Anne wrote a letter of congratulation to the organisation from Buckingham Palace in her capacity as president of the Royal Agricultural Society of the Commonwealth.
