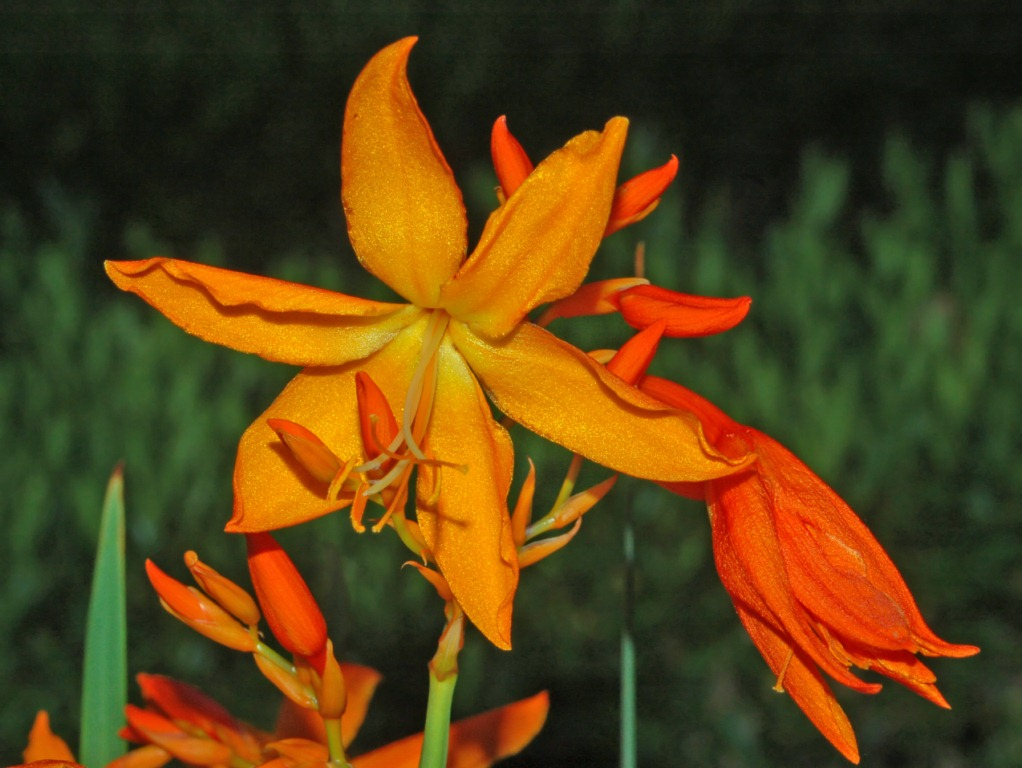

Scientific classification
- Kingdom: Plantae
- Clade: Embryophytes
- Clade: Tracheophytes
- Clade: Spermatophytes
- Clade: Angiosperms
- Clade: Monocots
- Order: Asparagales
- Family: Iridaceae
- Genus: Crocosmia
- Species: C. aurea

Binomial name
- Crocosmia aurea (Pappe ex Hook.) Planch.

Synonyms
- Tritonia aurea Pappe ex Hook., Bot. Mag. 73: t. 4335 (1847).; Babiana aurea (Pappe ex Hook.) Klotzsch, Allg. Gartenzeitung 19: 293 (1851).

= Crocosmia aurea =

Species of flowering plant

Crocosmia aurea, common names falling stars, Valentine flower, or montbretia, is a perennial flowering plant belonging to the family Iridaceae.

== Etymology ==
The genus name is derived from the Greek words krokos, meaning "saffron", and osme, meaning "odor", as dried leaves of these plants, when immersed in hot water, emit a strong smell similar to saffron. The species Latin name aurea, meaning “golden”, refers to the bright colour of the flowers.

== Description ==
Crocosmia aurea reaches on average 120 centimetres (47 in) in height. It grows from basal underground corms with long stolons. The basal, alternate leaves are cauline, linear, with a distinct midvein and entire margins, about 20–30 millimetres (0.79–1.18 in) wide. At the end of the flower stalk they have colourful branched inflorescences of bright orange to red flowers, reaching on average 40 millimetres (1.6 in) in diameter. The flowering period extends from June through August. The fruit is a capsule, with small blackish and round seeds. The plant can also be propagated by dividing the clumps of corms, fleshy underground stems similar to bulbs.

== Distribution ==
Crocosmia aurea is widely distributed in southern and eastern Africa, from South Africa to Sudan. In South Africa it is common in the grasslands of the Cape Floristic Region.

== Habitat ==
Usually these plants live in large colonies in shady forests and in banks of the rivers. They prefer moist habitats, at an altitude of 0–2,000 metres (0–6,562 ft) above sea level.

== Gallery ==
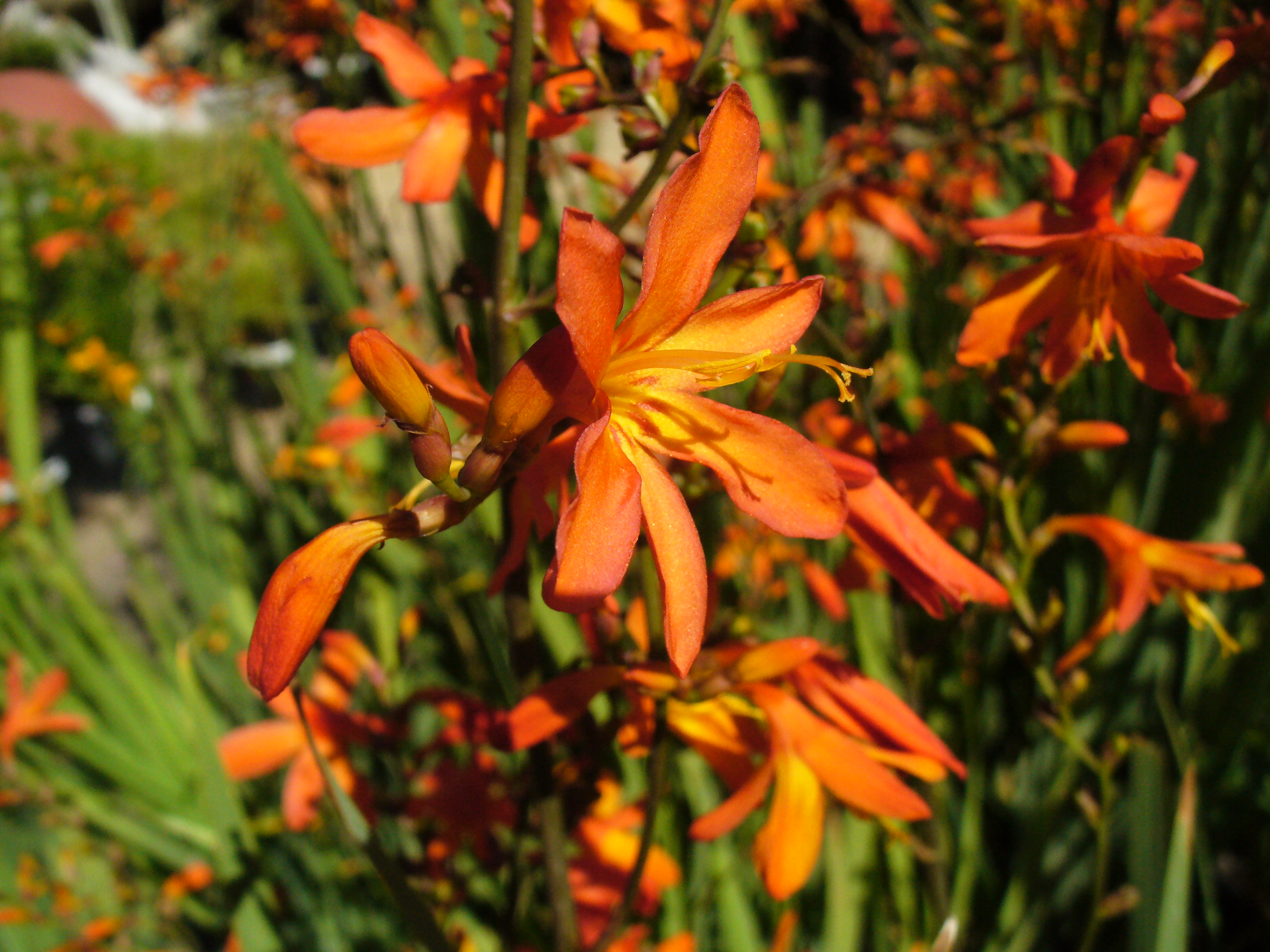
Plant of Crocosmia aurea

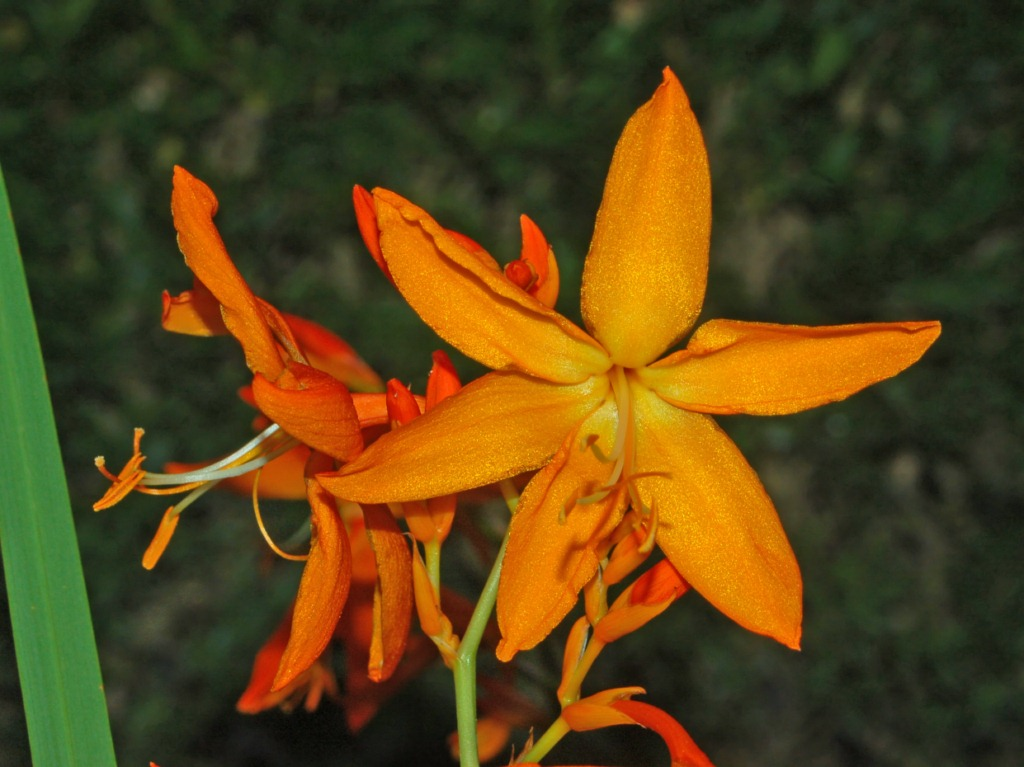
Flower of Crocosmia aurea

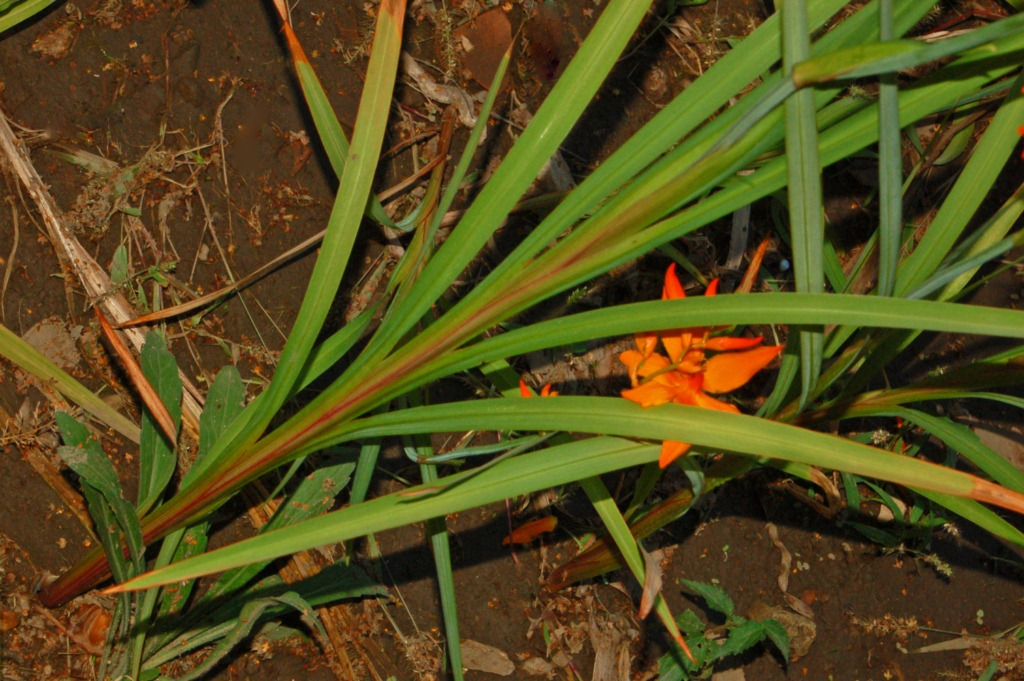
Leaves of Crocosmia aurea

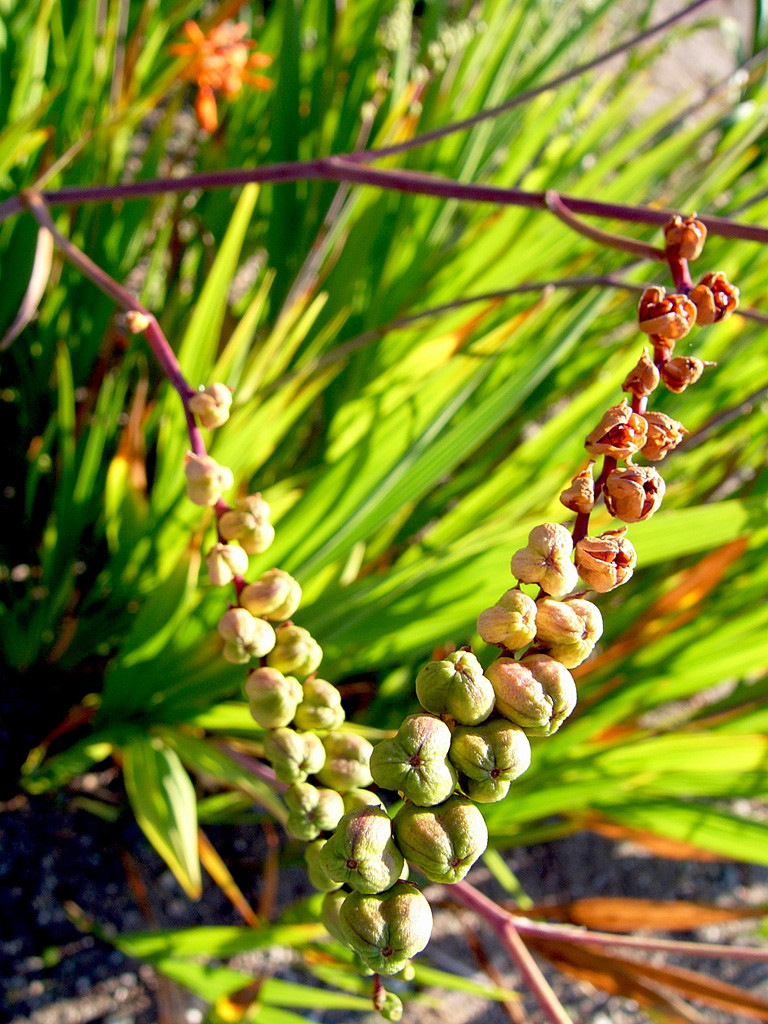
Fruits of Crocosmia aurea
