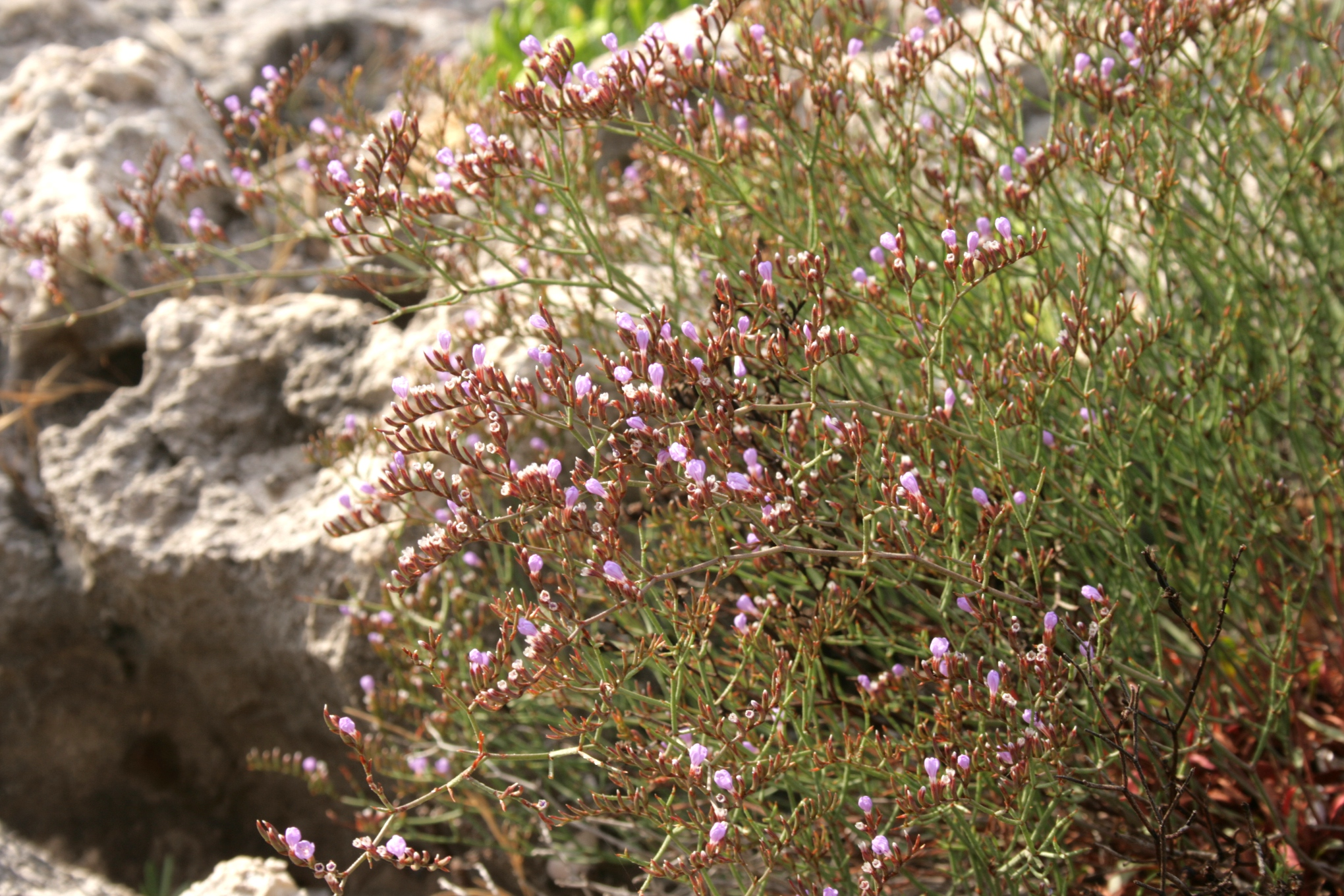
- Plant on the island of Majorca, the Mediterranean

Scientific classification
- Kingdom: Plantae
- Clade: Embryophytes
- Clade: Tracheophytes
- Clade: Spermatophytes
- Clade: Angiosperms
- Clade: Eudicots
- Order: Caryophyllales
- Family: Plumbaginaceae
- Genus: Limonium
- Species: L. ramosissimum

Binomial name
- Limonium ramosissimum (Poir.) Maire

= Limonium ramosissimum =

Algerian sea-lavender

Species of flowering plant

Limonium ramosissimum, the Algerian sea lavender, is a species of sea lavender (Limonium) native to the Mediterranean region. Its specific epithet rāmōsissimum means "many-branched" in Latin.

== Ecological characteristics ==
As a halophyte, Limonium ramosissimum has the ability to tolerate a wide range of salt levels (salinity-tolerant) in the soil and also has the ability to actively lower the soil salinity by taking up and excreting salt through glands in the inflorescence, which are then free to break off and blow away. This could have the effect of changing the species composition of an area by reducing salinity in the soil.

=== Invasive species ===
These plants are also very fecund, producing many seeds, and are also able to compete with native flora. It has escaped cultivation and become an invasive species in salt marshes of California.

== Subspecies ==
- Limonium ramosissimum subsp. provinciale
