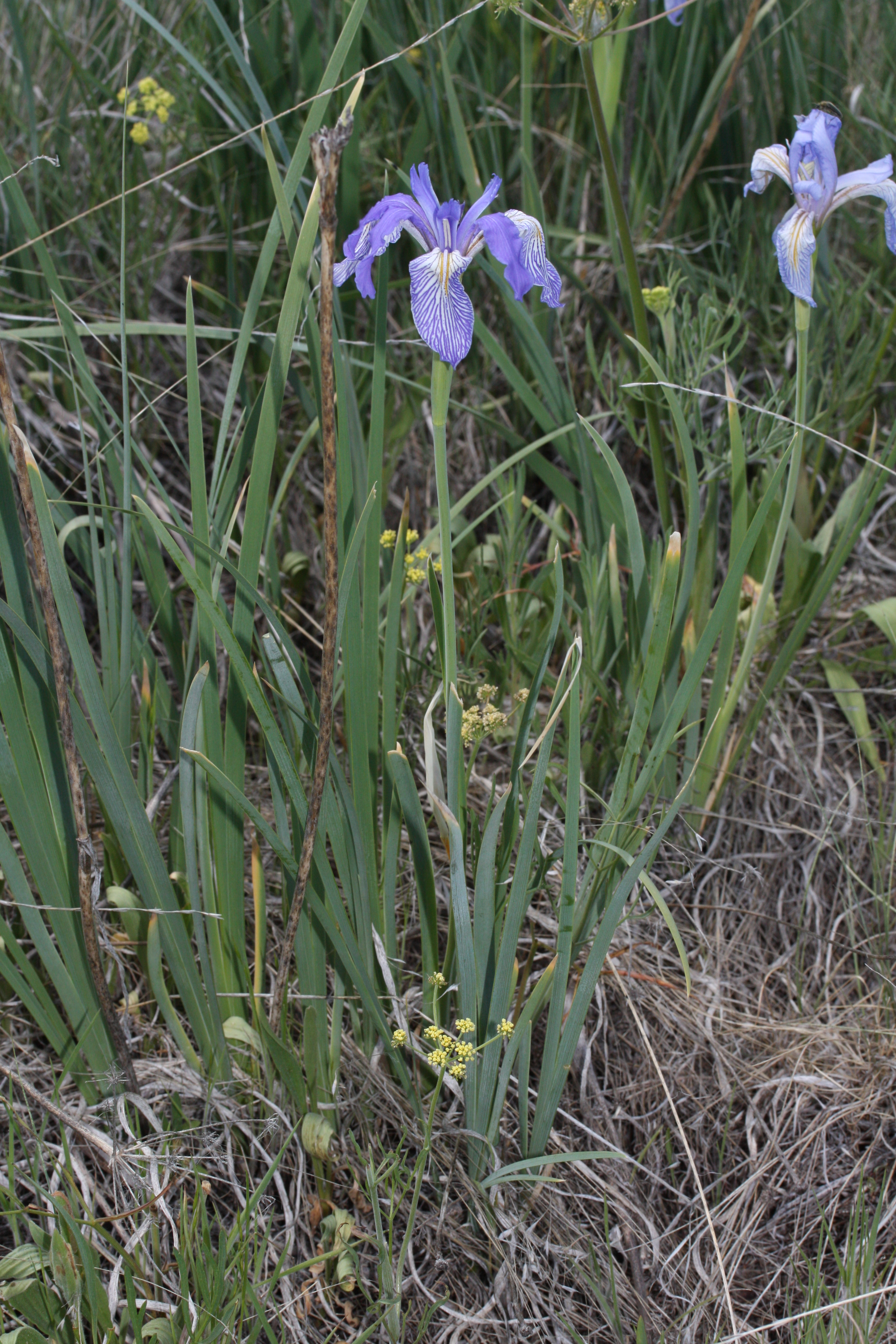
- Iris missouriensis (Wenas Wildlife Area, Washington)

Conservation status
- Least Concern (IUCN 3.1)

- Secure (NatureServe)

Scientific classification
- Kingdom: Plantae
- Clade: Tracheophytes
- Clade: Angiosperms
- Clade: Monocots
- Order: Asparagales
- Family: Iridaceae
- Genus: Iris
- Subgenus: Iris subg. Limniris
- Section: Iris sect. Limniris
- Series: Iris ser. Longipetalae
- Species: I. missouriensis

Binomial name
- Iris missouriensis Nutt., 1834

Synonyms
- List: Dielsiris arizonica (Dykes) M.B.Crespo, Mart.-Azorín & Mavrodiev (2015); Dielsiris missouriensis (Nutt.) M.B.Crespo, Mart.-Azorín & Mavrodiev (2015); Dielsiris pariensis (S.L.Welsh) M.B.Crespo, Mart.-Azorín & Mavrodiev (2015); Dielsiris pelogonus (Goodd.) M.B.Crespo, Mart.-Azorín & Mavrodiev (2015); Iris arizonica Dykes (1917); Iris haematophylla var. valametica Herb. ex Hook. (1839); Iris longipetala var. montana Baker (1892); Iris missouriensis f. alba H.St.John (1960); Iris missouriensis var. albiflora Cockerell (1889); Iris missouriensis f. angustispatha R.C.Foster (1937); Iris missouriensis var. arizonica (Dykes) R.C.Foster (1937); Iris missouriensis var. pelogonus (Goodd.) R.C.Foster (1937); Iris missuriensis M.Martens (1840); Iris montana Nutt. ex Dykes (1913); Iris pariensis S.L.Welsh (1986); Iris pelogonus Goodd. (1902); Iris tolmieana Herb. (1840); Limniris missouriensis (Nutt.) Rodion. (2007)

= Iris missouriensis =

North American species of iris

Iris missouriensis (syn. I. montana) is a hardy flowering rhizomatous species of the genus Iris, in the family Iridaceae. Its common names include western blue flag, Rocky Mountain iris, and Missouri flag.

It is native to western North America. Its distribution is varied; it grows at high elevations in mountains and alpine meadows and all the way down to sea level in coastal hills.

== Description ==
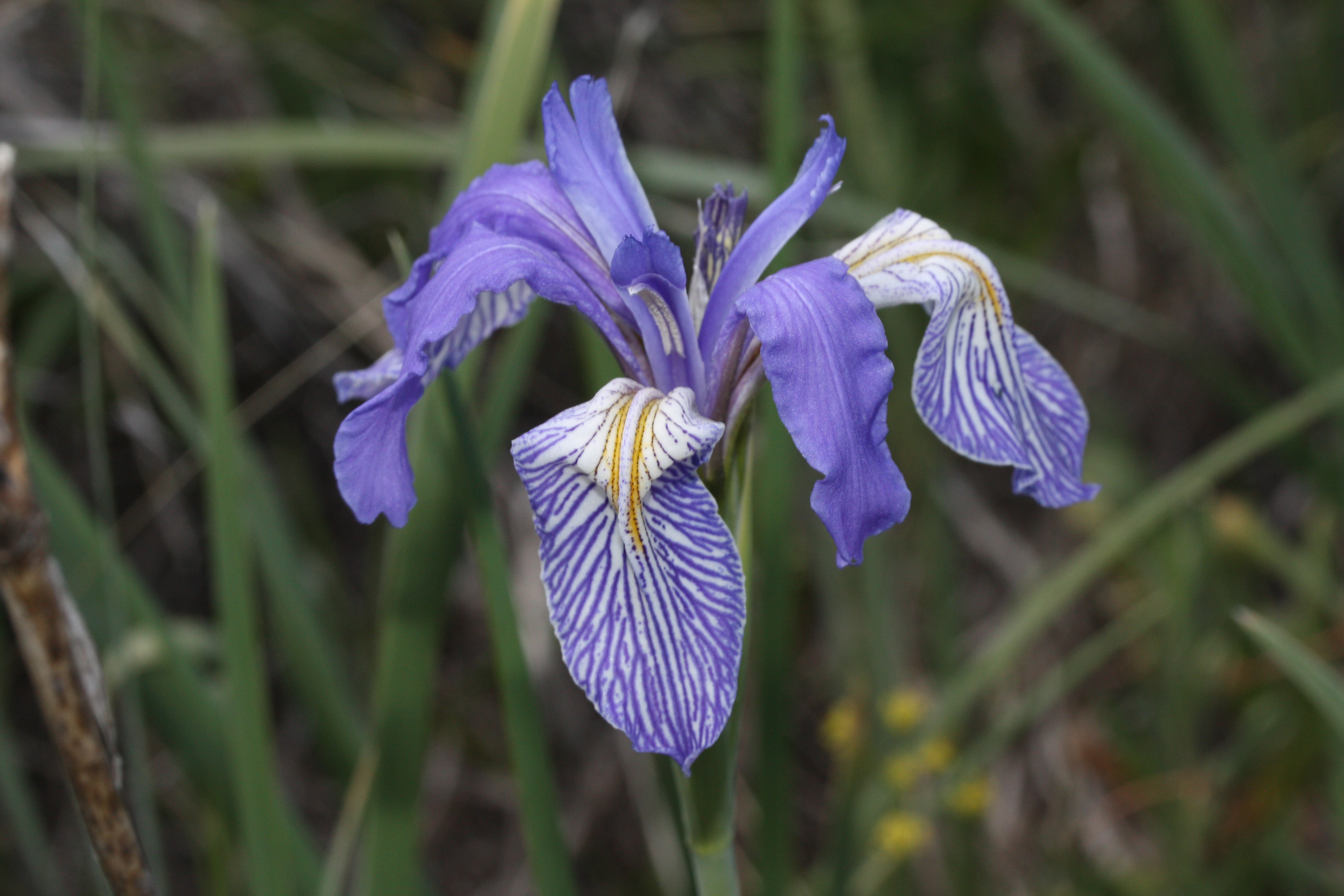
The three, usually light blue, sepals have purple lines and surround the three smaller darker-blue petals.

Iris missouriensis is an erect herbaceous rhizomatous perennial, 20 to 40 centimetres (7 7/8 to 15 3/4 in) high, with leafless unbranched scapes (flowering stems) and linear basal leaves, 5 to 10 mm wide, similar in height to the scapes. The inflorescence usually consists of one or two flowers, exceptionally three or four. Each flower has three light to dark blue, spreading or reflexed sepals lined with purple and three smaller upright blue petals. They produce a large fruit capsule.

The plant populations often spread outwards from the older plants, leaving a dead opening in the center of a growing ring.

== Uses ==
Some Native American tribes made cordage from the plant's stems and leaves. Some Plateau Indian tribes used the roots to treat toothache. The Navajo used a decoction of the plant as an emetic. Plains Indians are said to have extracted the toxin irisin (also known as iridin and irisine) from the plant to use as arrow poison. The Zuni apply a poultice of chewed root to increase the strength of newborns and infants.

This iris is listed as a weed in some areas, particularly in agricultural California. It is bitter and distasteful to livestock and heavy growths of the plant are a nuisance in pasture land. Heavy grazing in an area promotes the growth of this hardy iris.

The plant is widely cultivated in temperate regions.

== Toxicity ==
The plant is toxic, particularly the rootstalks, which contain the potentially lethal iridin.
