= Karl Wilhelm Ludwig Pappe =

(1803-1862) German-born physician and botanist

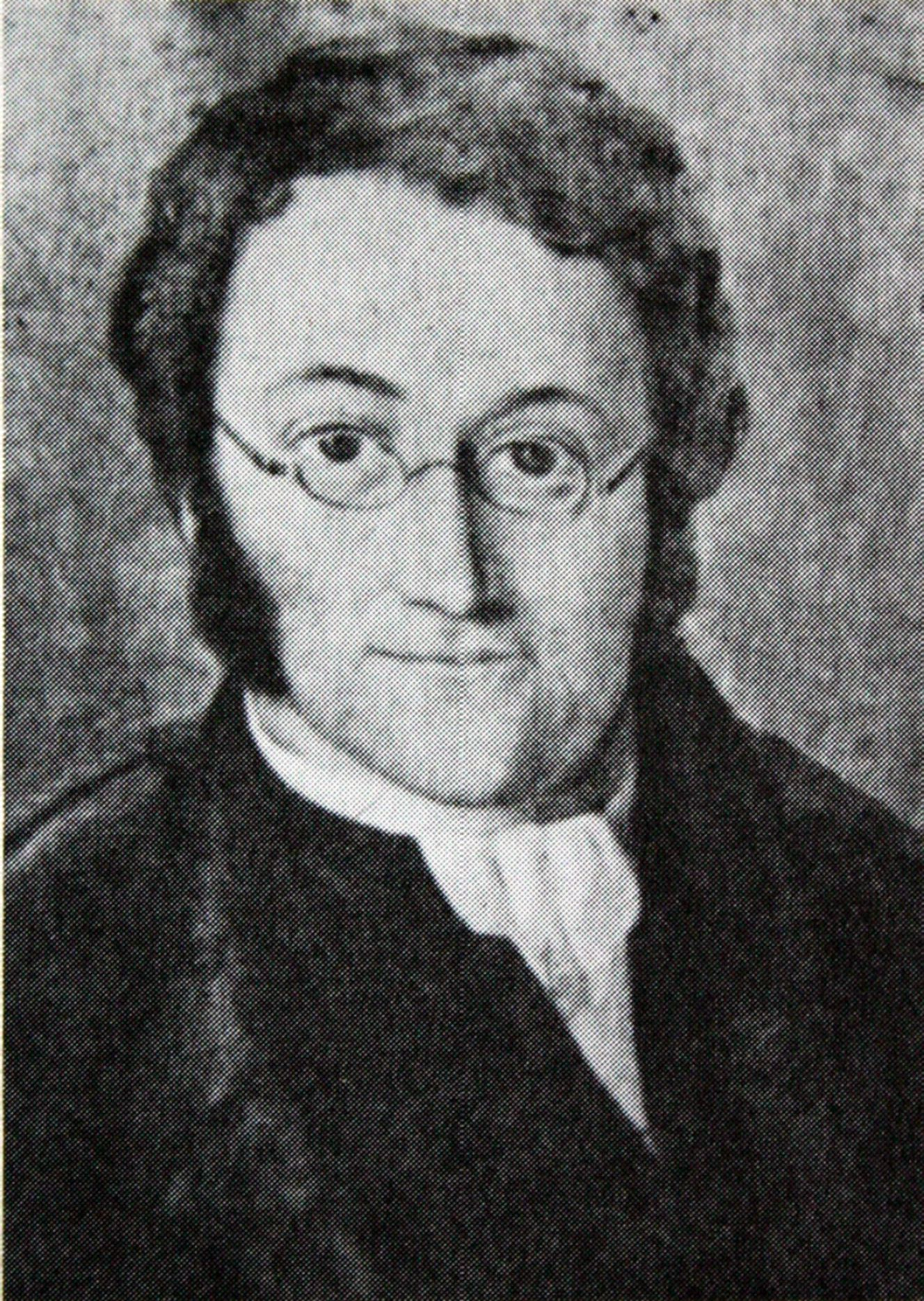
- Born: 1803; Hamburg, Germany
- Died: 1862 (aged 58–59); Cape Colony
- Citizenship: German
- Education: University of Leipzig
- Spouse: Maria Bam Mastaer (or Mestaer) (m.1839)
- Scientific career
- Fields: Medicine; Botany
- Workplaces: South African College
- Thesis: Enumerationes plantarum phaenogamarum lipsiensium specimen (1827)

Karl Wilhelm Ludwig Pappe (1803 in Hamburg – 14 October 1862) was a German-born medical doctor and botanist who lived and worked in Cape Colony. He was the first person to hold the position of government botanist and the first professor of botany at the South African College. His herbarium became the oldest surviving botanical collection in South Africa.

== Education ==
Pappe studied medicine and botany at the Leipzig University. He qualified in medicine in 1827 with a thesis on the flowering plants of Leipzig, "Enumerationes plantarum phaenogamarum lipsiensium specimen".

== Medical career ==
He travelled to Cape Town in January 1831 and was registered as a physician, surgeon and accoucheur (a male obstetrician). He joined the South African Medical Society in 1832 and was one of three doctors in charge of the temporary hospital in Cape Town during the measles epidemic of 1839. From 1855 to 1858 he served as physician to the European Sick and Burial Society and the Widows' Fund.

== Botanical career ==
Pappe started collecting plants around Cape Town from 1831 and this soon became his chief interest. He published "Systematische lijst van zoodanige Kaapse planten geslachten, als naar zulke natuurkundigen genoemd zijn die zich in de botanie vedienstelijk gemaakt hebben" (Systematic list of those Cape plants that have been named after naturalists who distinguished themselves in botany) in the Nederduitsch Zuid-Afrikaansch Tijdschrift (Dutch-German South African Magazine) in 1833.

In 1847 Pappe submitted a paper, containing 60 plant remedies, to the Cape Town Medical Gazette, entitled "A list of South African indigenous plants used as remedies by the colonists" which was based on C.P. Thunberg's "Resa uti Europa, Africa, Asia, förrättad åren 1770–1779"(Travels in Europe, Africa and Asia Made Between the Years 1770–1779). It was republished in 1847 as a pamphlet, "A list of South African indigenous plants, used as remedies by colonists of the Cape of Good Hope". This became the basis for his "Florae Capensis medicae prodromus: or, an enumeration of South African indigenous plants, used as remedies by the colonists of the cape of Good Hope" in 1850, which was to accompany a collection of Cape medication sent to the Great Exhibition of 1851 in London.

Pappe collaborated with the colonial secretary, Rawson W. Rawson in a study of 160 species of South African ferns which was published as "Synopsis filicum Africae Australis; or, an enumeration of the South African ferns" in the Cape Monthly Magazine (1957). In August 1858, Rawson appointed him as government botanist, a position he had proposed.

Pappe became the first professor of botany at the South African College later in 1858. This was an unpaid position, although he received some student fees. He started lecturing in April 1959 with introductory botany, the Linnaean taxonomy of plants, and plant physiology.

Many of the plants Pappe collected on several trips to the Eastern Cape and Namaqualand were sent to his friend W.H. Harvey in Dublin. He expanded his personal herbarium with the purchase of C.L.P. Zeyher's collection. After his death the herbarium was sold to the government and became the Cape Government Herbarium and in 1956 was transferred to the Compton Herbarium at Kirstenbosch National Botanical Garden on permanent loan.

In 1854 Pappe published "Sylva Capensis; or, a description of South African forest-trees and arborescent shrubs" which was a commentary on the 77 specimens sent to the Universal Exhibition in Paris in 1855. In 1859 he advised the United States government on indigenous plants of economic value while advising the Madras government of the value of Indian millet. He also wrote about the dangers of deforestation and suggested conservation measures.

=== Garden ===
Pappe was in favour of the establishment of a proper botanical garden in Cape Town. To this end, in 1845 he wrote several letters to the editor of The South African Commercial Advertiser describing the history of the Cape garden established by the Dutch East India Company. When subscriptions to finance the garden were started in May 1848, he subscribed £2 per annum. Harry Smith, governor of the Cape appointed him to a commission to supervise the development of the botanic garden. In 1849, he assisted in acquiring trees and shrubs from Baron von Ludwig's estate for the garden, as Pappe had been acquainted with him prior to von Ludwig's death in 1847. He also collected plants from South Africa for the garden and obtained others from overseas. In 1850, he resigned from the commission in protest when C.L.P. Zeyher, the gardener, was dismissed.

=== Select works ===
- Florae capensis medicae prodromus, or, An enumeration of South African indigenous plants : used as remedies by the colonists of the Cape of Good Hope. Cape Town: W. Brittain. 1857.
- Silva capensis; or, A description of South African forest-trees and arborescent shrubs used for technical and oeconomical purposes by the colonists of the Cape of Good Hope. London: Ward and Co. 1862.
- Synopsis Filicum Africae australis; or, an enumeration of the South African ferns hitherto known. Cape Town: Saul Solomon. 1858.

== Zoological interests ==
In 1853, Pappe published "Synopsis of the edible fishes at the Cape of Good Hope" in which 45 species were described. The work was inspired by Andrew Smith's "Illustrations of the Zoology of South Africa (1838–50)".

In 1855, he presented many specimens of Coleoptera and Hymenoptera to the South African Museum.

== Eponyms ==
The genus of small African trees Pappea (Family Sapindaceae) was named after him by C.F. Ecklon and Zeyher. He was also commemorated in the species of legume, Lessertia pappeana and the fern, Asplenium pappei.

As a taxonomist he described the genus Atherstonea Pappe (synonym Strychnos, family Loganiaceae).

== Personal life ==
Pappe married Maria Bam Mastaer (or Mestaer) in 1839 and they had five children. His library of more than 1,300 books was auctioned off after his death on 14 October 1862.
