= List of invasive plant species in West Virginia =

Numerous plants have been introduced to West Virginia in the United States, and many of them have become invasive species.

== Invasive plants ==
The following are some of invasive plant species established in West Virginia:

Picture	Scientific Name	Common Name
	Ajuga reptans	bugle
	Akebia quinata	chocolate vine
	Alliaria petiolata	garlic mustard
	Arctium minus	lesser burdock
	Bidens aristosa	bearded beggarticks
	Bromus tectorum	drooping brome
	Buddleja davidii	summer lilac
	Carduus acanthoides	spiny plumeless thistle
	Carduus crispus	curly plumeless thistle
	Carduus nutans	musk thistle
	Centaurea jacea	brown knapweed
	Cirsium arvense	Canada thistle
	Cirsium vulgare	spear thistle
	Convolvulus arvensis	field bindweed
	Dioscorea polystachya	Chinese yam
	Dipsacus fullonum	wild teasel
	Elaeagnus umbellata	autumn olive, Japanese silverberry
	Euphorbia cyparissias	cypress spurge
	Hedera helix	common ivy
	Hesperis matronalis	dame's rocket
	Inula helenium	horse-heal
	Isatis tinctoria	woad
	Lespedeza cuneata	Chinese bushclover
	Ligustrum vulgare	common privet
	Lonicera japonica	Japanese honeysuckle
	Lonicera maackii	Amur honeysuckle
	Lotus corniculatus	common bird's-foot trefoil
	Miscanthus sinensis	maiden silvergrass
	Myriophyllum spicatum	Eurasian watermilfoil
	Phragmites	
	Pyrus calleryana	callery pear
	Rhamnus cathartica	buckthorn
	Rhodotypos scandens	jetbead
	Rubus laciniatus	cutleaf evergreen blackberry
	Salix × fragilis	crack willow
	Securigera varia	crownvetch
	Solanum dulcamara	bittersweet
	Sorbus aucuparia	rowan
	Stellaria media	chickweed
	Tanacetum vulgare	common tansy
	Tussilago	coltsfoot
	Verbascum thapsus	great mullein
	Vinca minor	lesser periwinkle
	Wisteria sinensis	Chinese wisteria

== See also ==
- List of trees naturalized in West Virginia
- Invasive species in the United States
