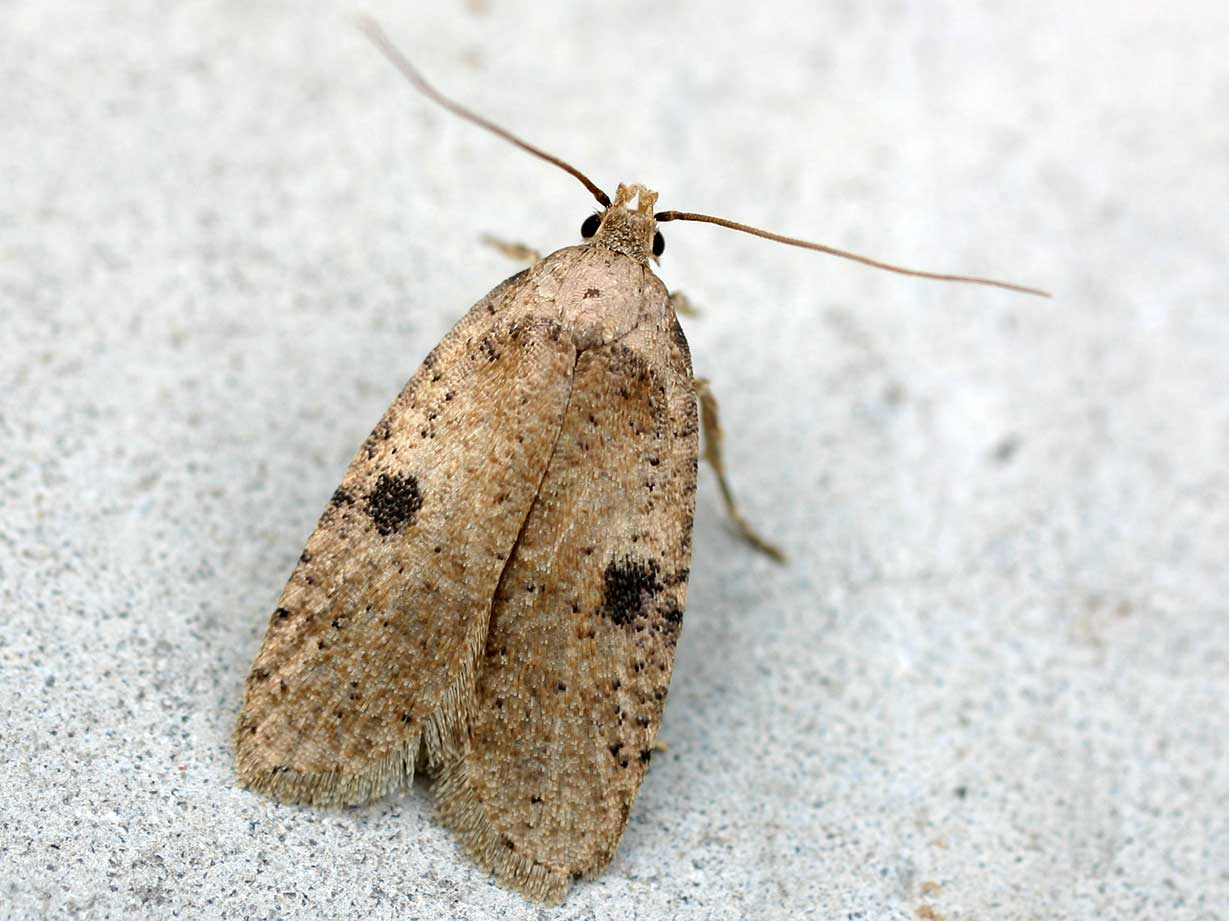

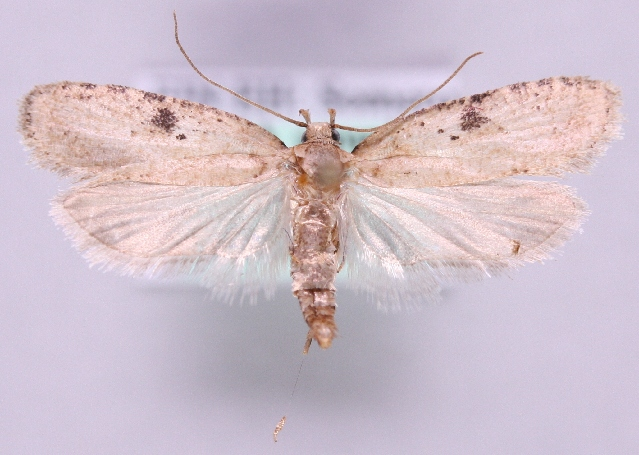

Scientific classification
- Kingdom: Animalia
- Phylum: Arthropoda
- Clade: Pancrustacea
- Class: Insecta
- Order: Lepidoptera
- Family: Depressariidae
- Genus: Agonopterix
- Species: A. propinquella

Binomial name
- Agonopterix propinquella (Treitschke, 1835)

Synonyms
- Haemylis propinquella Treitschke, 1835; Haemylis propinquella ab. minor Dufrane, 1931

= Agonopterix propinquella =

Species of moth

Agonopterix propinquella is a species of moth of the family Depressariidae. It is found in Europe.

The wingspan is 16–19 mm.Similar to Agonopterix subpropinquella. Adults are on wing from September to July depending on the location.

The larvae feed on Arctium, Carduus, Centaurea, Cirsium arvense, Cirsium vulgare, Cynara, Mycelis muralis and Serratula. They initially mine the leaves of their host plant. Larvae can be found from July to early August. They are apple green with a black head.
