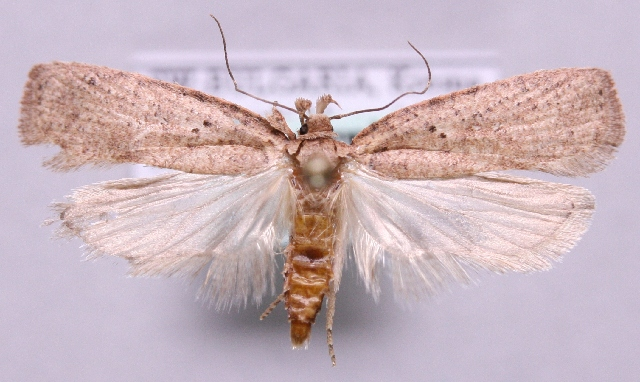

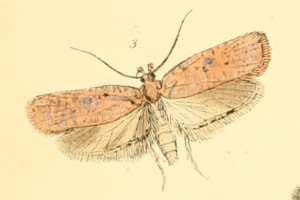

Scientific classification
- Kingdom: Animalia
- Phylum: Arthropoda
- Clade: Pancrustacea
- Class: Insecta
- Order: Lepidoptera
- Family: Depressariidae
- Genus: Agonopterix
- Species: A. subpropinquella

Binomial name
- Agonopterix subpropinquella (Stainton, 1849)

Synonyms
- Depressaria subpropinquella Stainton, 1849; Depressaria rhodochrella Herrich-Schäffer, 1854 (form); Depressaria intermediella Stainton, 1849; Haemilis heracliella Duponchel, 1838; Depressaria himmighofenella Herrich-Schäffer, 1854; Depressaria thoracica Lederer, 1855; Depressaria sublutella Staudinger, 1859; Depressaria subpropinquella ab. variabilis Heinemann, 1870; Depressaria crispella Chrétien, 1929; Depressaria keltella Amsel, 1935; Depressaria amilcarella Lucas, 1950

= Agonopterix subpropinquella =

Species of moth

Agonopterix subpropinquella is a moth of the family Depressariidae. It is found in most of Europe.

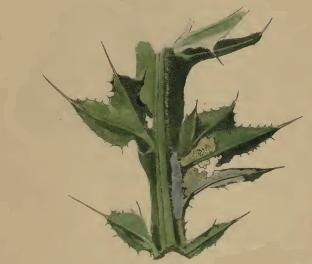
a leaf of Cirsium vulgare gnawed beneath by larva

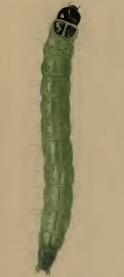
Larva

The wingspan is 16–22 mm. The thorax is sometimes dark fuscous. Forewings are light ochreous to brownish -ochreous, sometimes slightly reddish -tinged, with a few blackish scales; first discal stigma black, preceded by a similar dot obliquely above it, second blackish, often obsolete; a dark fuscous often suffused spot between and above these. Hindwings pale fuscous. The larva is green; dorsal line somewhat darker; dots grey; head and plate of 2 black. They are found throughout Europe, widespread in England, Wales and less common in Ireland and northern Scotland.

Adults are on wing from August to May.

The larvae feed on Arctium lappa, Carduus crispus, Carduus tenuiflorus, Centaurea cyanus, Centaurea jacea, Centaurea scabiosa, Cirsium acaule, Cirsium arvense, Cirsium creticum, Cirsium vulgare and Onopordum acanthium. They initially mine the leaves of their host plant. Larvae can be found from June to July.
