= Jordanita graeca =

Scientific classification
- Domain: Eukaryota
- Kingdom: Animalia
- Phylum: Arthropoda
- Class: Insecta
- Order: Lepidoptera
- Family: Zygaenidae
- Genus: Jordanita
- Species: J. graeca

Binomial name
- Jordanita graeca (Jordan, 1907)

Synonyms
- Procris graeca Jordan, 1907

Species of moth

Jordanita graeca is a moth of the family Zygaenidae. It is found from southern Slovakia through Hungary, the Balkan Peninsula, Rhodes and Cyprus to southern Russia, Ukraine, Transcaucasia, Turkey, Iran and northern Iraq.

The length of the forewings is 7.5–12.5 mm for males and 7–12 mm for females. Adults are on wing from May to July.

The larvae of subspecies graeca feed on Centaurea melitensis and Cirsium creticum, while the larvae of subspecies sultana feed on Centaurea solstitialis, Centaurea salonitana, Carduus arabicus, Carduus uncinatus, Jurinea sordida and Xeranthemum annuum.

== Subspecies ==
- Jordanita graeca graeca (from Slovakia, Hungary and Ukraine to south-western Turkey)
- Jordanita graeca sultana (Alberti, 1937) (the Crimea, central and southern Turkey and Armenia)

== Bibliography ==
- C. M. Naumann, W. G. Tremewan: The Western Palaearctic Zygaenidae. Apollo Books, Stenstrup 1999, ISBN 87-88757-15-3
- Šašić, Martina; Nahirnić, Ana; Tarmann, Gerhard M. (2016-12-31). "Zygaenidae (Lepidoptera) in the Lepidoptera collections of the Croatian Natural History Museum". Natura Croatica: Periodicum Musei Historiae Naturalis Croatici. 25 (2): 233–248. doi:10.20302/NC.2016.25.19. eISSN 1848-7386.
