= Crute (disambiguation) =

Crute may refer to:

- Crute, a surname
- CRUTE, the EPPO code of Carduus tenuiflorus
