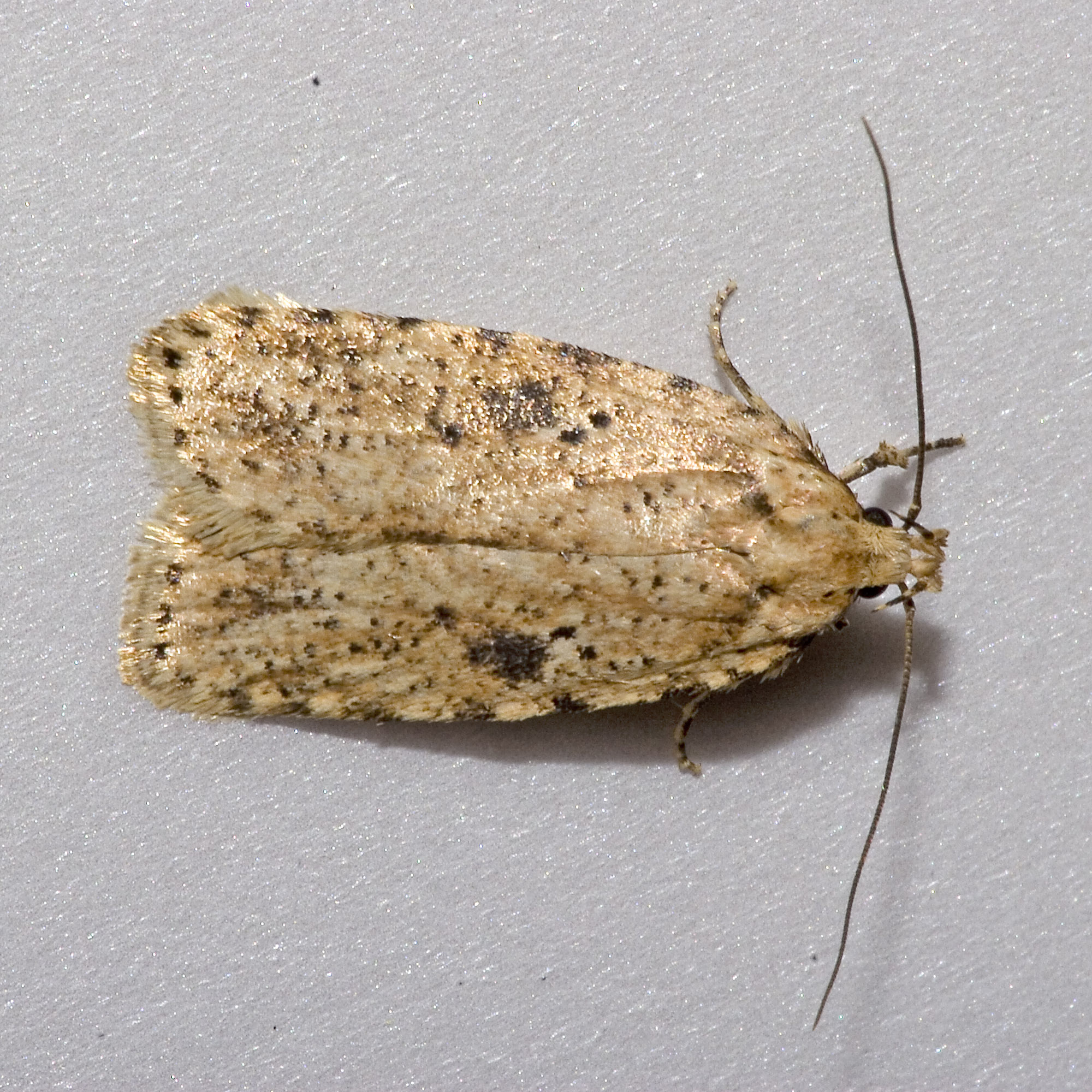

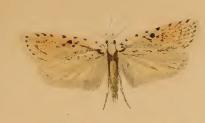

Scientific classification
- Kingdom: Animalia
- Phylum: Arthropoda
- Clade: Pancrustacea
- Class: Insecta
- Order: Lepidoptera
- Family: Depressariidae
- Genus: Agonopterix
- Species: A. arenella

Binomial name
- Agonopterix arenella (Denis & Schiffermüller, 1775)

Synonyms
- Tinea arenella Denis & Schiffermuller, 1775; Tinea gilvella Hübner, 1796; Depressaria immaculana Stephens, 1834

= Agonopterix arenella =

Species of moth

Agonopterix arenella is a species of moth of the family Depressariidae. It is found in all of Europe, except the Iberian Peninsula.

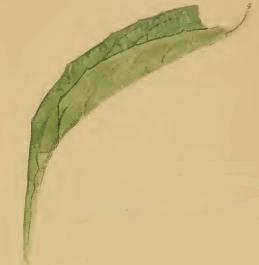
A leaf of Centaurea nigra folded by larva

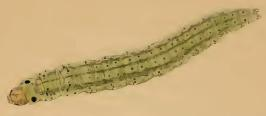
Larva

The wingspan is 19–23 mm. The forewings are whitish ochreous, more or less suffused with fuscous and sprinkled with dark fuscous; costa spotted with dark fuscous; first discal stigma and a dot obliquely before and above it black; second indistinct, dark fuscous; a dark fuscous spot between and above these; dark fuscous terminal dots. Hindwings are pale whitish-fuscous. The larva is green, paler laterally; dorsal and subdorsal lines dark green; dots blackish; head light brownish-ochreous; 2 with two blackish spots.

The larvae feed on Arctium lappa, Carduus, Carlina, Centaurea jacea, Centaurea nigra, Centaurea scabiosa, Cirsium vulgare, Knautia, Serratula tinctoria and Sonchus. They mine the leaves of their host plant. Larvae can be found from May to early August.

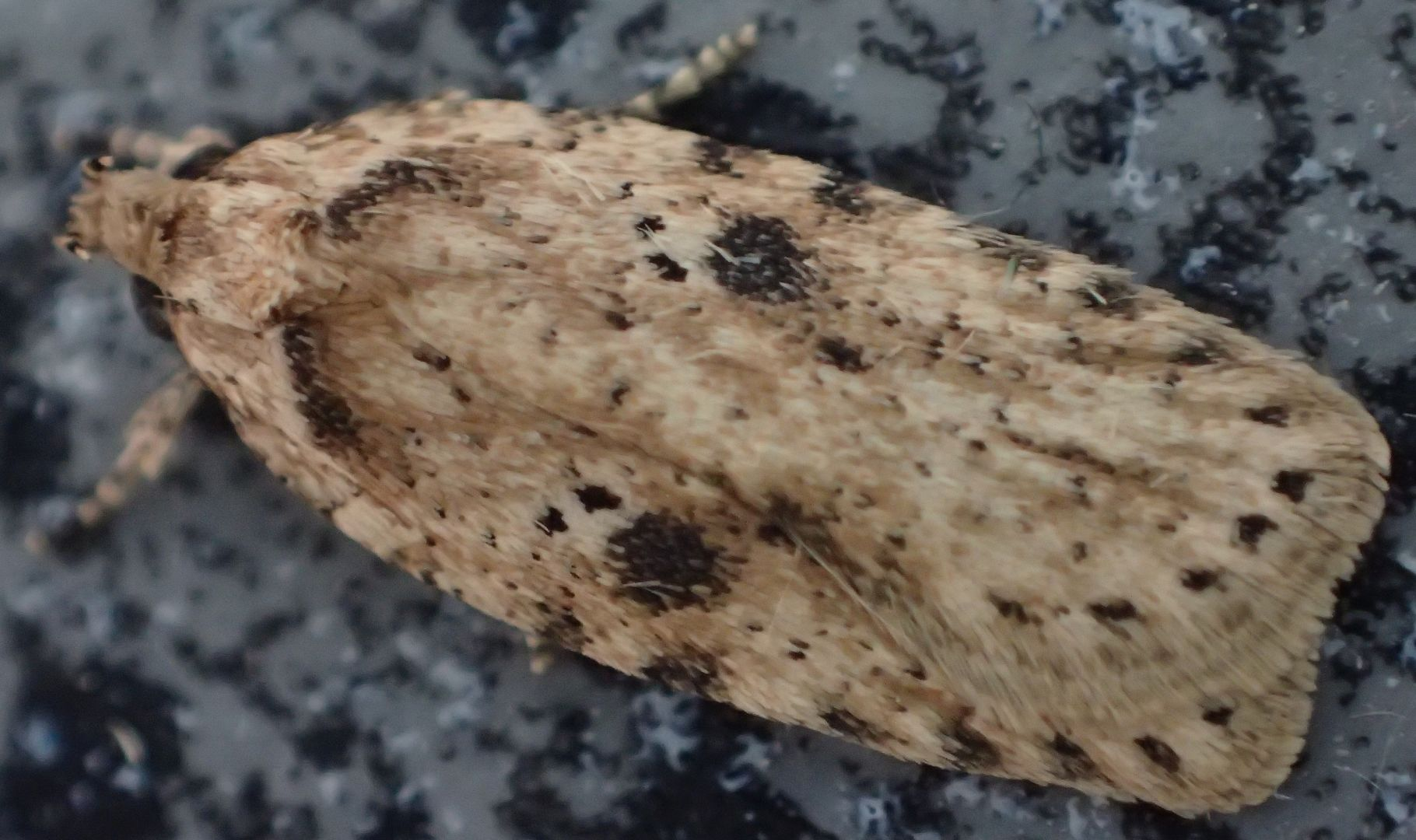

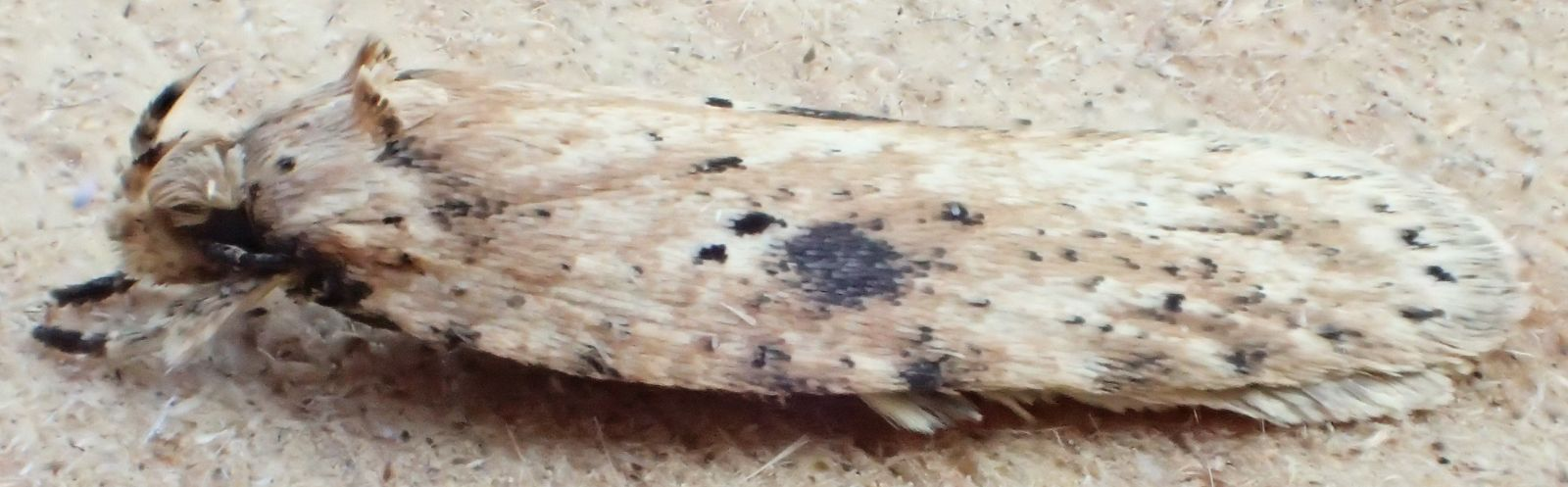
