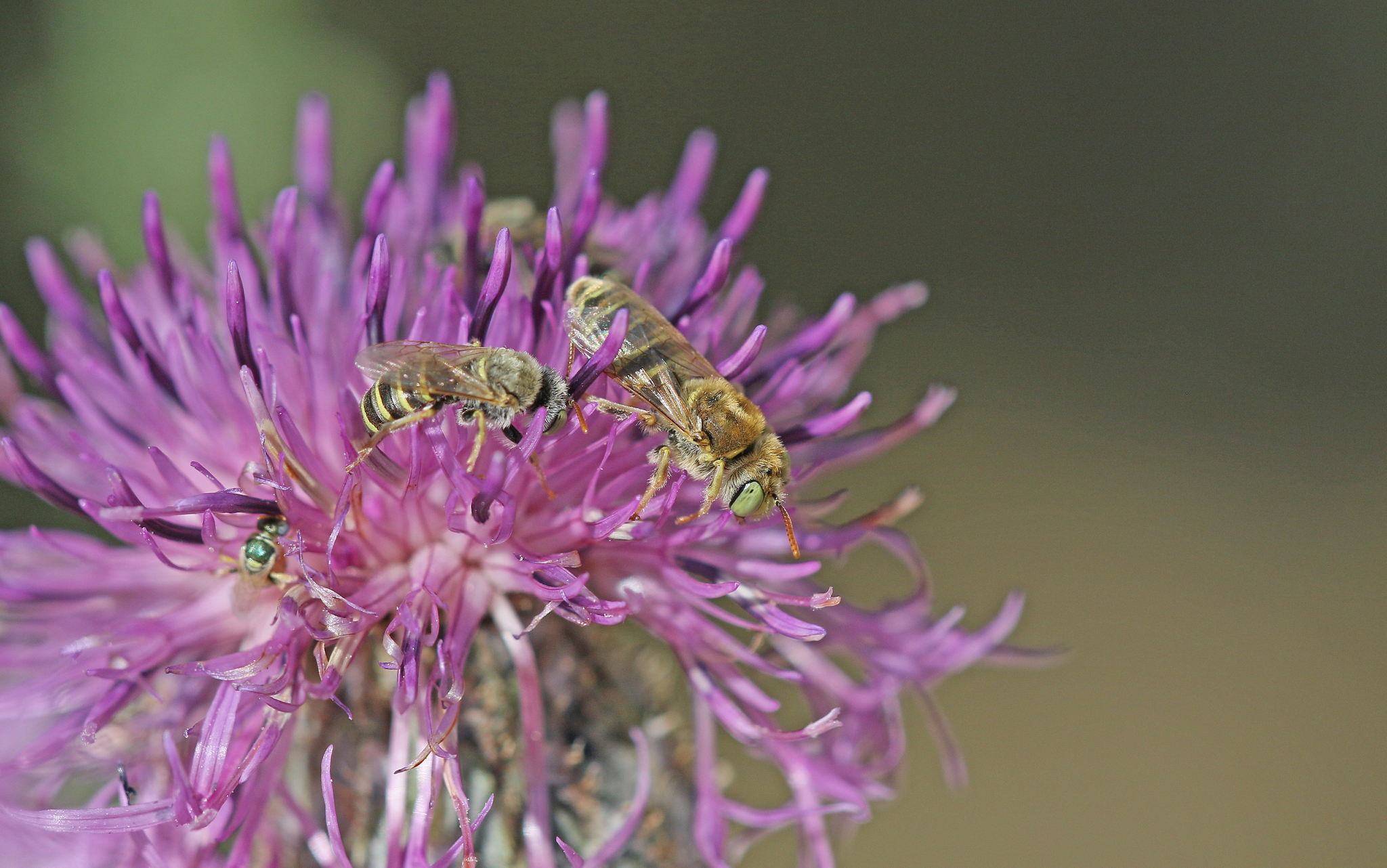
- Camptopoeum friesei Neusiedl am See, Burgenland, Austria

Scientific classification
- Kingdom: Animalia
- Phylum: Arthropoda
- Clade: Pancrustacea
- Class: Insecta
- Order: Hymenoptera
- Family: Andrenidae
- Genus: Camptopoeum
- Species: C. friesei

Binomial name
- Camptopoeum friesei Mocsary, 1894

Synonyms
- Panurgus friesei (Mocsáry, 1894); Camptopoeum friesei subinterruptum (Alfken, 1934); Camptopoeum friesei intermedium (Alfken, 1934); Camptopoeum friesei disparile (Alfken, 1934)

= Camptopoeum friesei =

Species of bee

Camptopoeum friesei is a species of bees of the genus Camptopoeum.

== Description ==
The species is 6–10 mm in size, the hairs of the male are long and dense, those of the female short and tight.

== Range ==
Central Asian-Eastern European. From Spain, southern and eastern Europe, Ukraine and southern Russia to Bashkiria and across Asia Minor and the Caucasus to western Turkmenistan and western Kazakhstan; northward to Eastern Austria and Slovakia, south to Lazio, Crete and the south coast of Turkey. In central Europe exclusively in the Lacken area of the Seewinkel area (Burgenland, Austria).

== Habitat ==
Camptopoeum friesei occurs in salt steppes from the lowlands to the colline altitude level.

== Ecology ==
Flight period is in one generation from July to September. Camptopoeum friesei is oligolectic on Asteraceae of the subfamily Carduoideae, mainly Centaurea and Carduus. When it comes to the nesting substrate, Camptopoeum friesei is extremely specialized. It only nests in salty, alternately moist soda soils (Solontschak soils), which e.g. occur in the area around Lake Neusiedl. It usually forms nest aggregations. Camptopoeum friesei is being parasited by the cuckoo bee Parammobatodes schmidti.

== Etymology ==
Dedicated to the German apidologist Heinrich FRIESE (1860-1948).
