= Crupe =

Crupe or CRUPE may refer to:

- CRUPE, the EPPO code of Carduus personata
- Jessie Wanda Crupe, an American country musician
