= Amata pseudosimplex =

Scientific classification
- Domain: Eukaryota
- Kingdom: Animalia
- Phylum: Arthropoda
- Class: Insecta
- Order: Lepidoptera
- Superfamily: Noctuoidea
- Family: Erebidae
- Subfamily: Arctiinae
- Genus: Amata
- Species: A. pseudosimplex

Binomial name
- Amata pseudosimplex de Freina, 2013

Species of moth

Amata pseudosimplex is a moth of the family Erebidae. It was described by Josef J. de Freina in 2013. It is found in South Africa.

The larvae are polyphagous and have been reared on Taraxacum, Carduus and Plantago species.
