= Crute =

Crute is a surname meaning "lump" or "dullard". Notable people with the surname include:

- Austin Crute (born 1995), American actor and singer
- Jimmy Crute (born 1996), Australian mixed martial artist
- Lawrence Crute (died 1930), state legislator in Arkansas, USA
- Sally Crute (1886–1971), American silent actress
