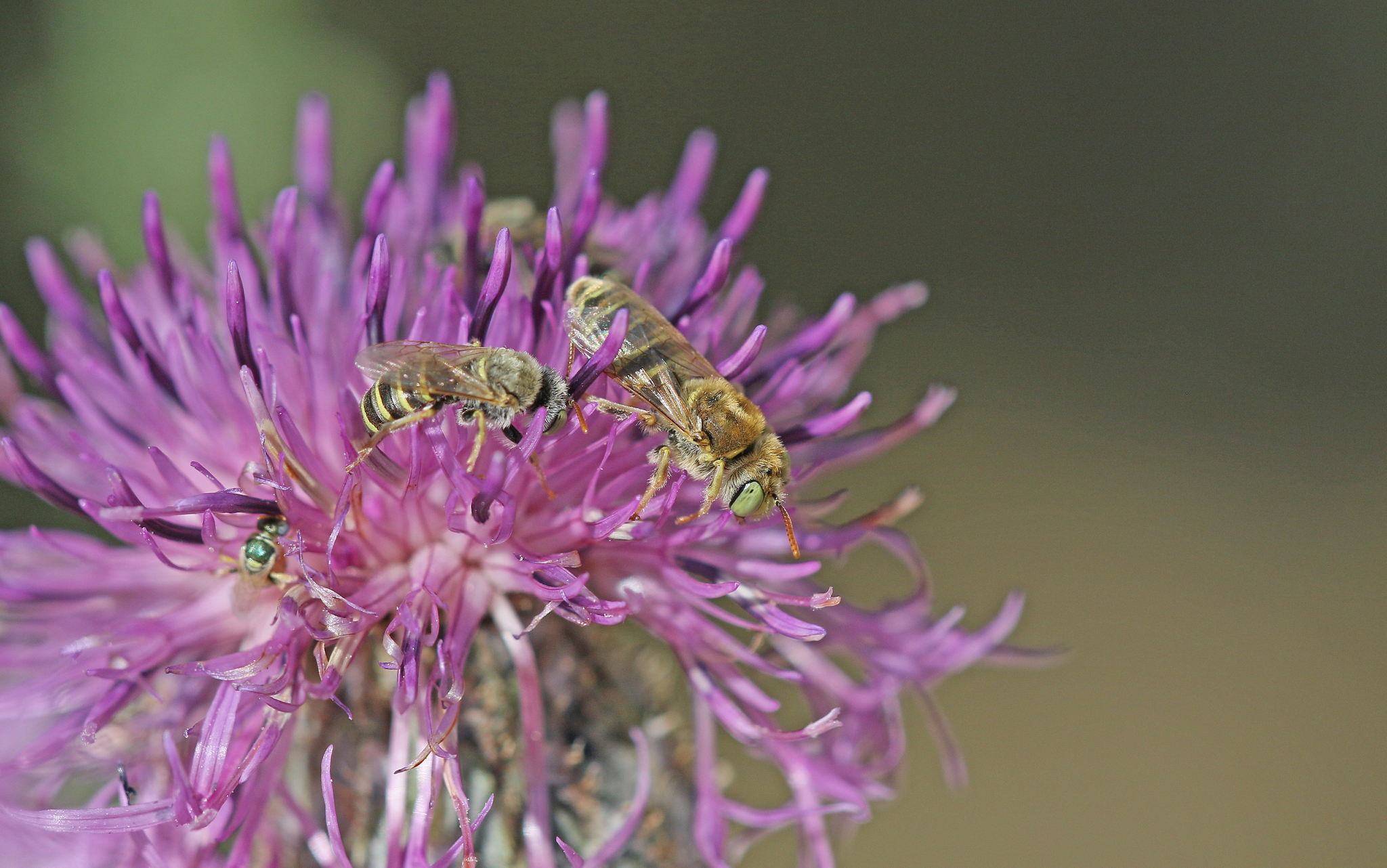
- Camptopoeum friesei at Neusiedl am See, Burgenland, Austria

Scientific classification
- Domain: Eukaryota
- Kingdom: Animalia
- Phylum: Arthropoda
- Class: Insecta
- Order: Hymenoptera
- Family: Andrenidae
- Subtribe: Camptopoeina
- Genus: Camptopoeum; Spinola, 1843

= Camptopoeum =

Genus of bee

Camptopoeum is a genus of bees of the subfamily Panurginae.

== Species ==
Catalogue of Life lists 31 species and 15 subspecies within Camptopoeum:

- Camptopoeum abbasi (Warncke, 1985)
- Camptopoeum afghanicum Patiny, 1999
- Camptopoeum altaicum Morawitz, 1891
- Camptopoeum armeniacum (Warncke, 1972)
- Camptopoeum bactrianum Popov, 1960
- Camptopoeum baldocki Wood & Cross, 2017
- Camptopoeum clypeare Morawitz, 1893
- Camptopoeum friesei Mocsáry, 1894
  - Camptopoeum friesei densum (Warncke, 1972)
  - Camptopoeum friesei euzonum (Warncke, 1972)
  - Camptopoeum friesei friesei Morawitz, 1894
- Camptopoeum frontale (Fabricius, 1804)
  - Camptopoeum frontale frontale (Fabricius, 1804)
  - Camptopoeum frontale persicum Cockerell, 1910
  - Camptopoeum frontale triticum (Warncke, 1972)
- Camptopoeum guichardi Patiny, 1999
- Camptopoeum handlirschi Friese, 1900
  - Camptopoeum handlirschi handlirschi Friese, 1900
  - Camptopoeum handlirschi verhoeffi Noskiewicz, 1962
- Camptopoeum iranellum (Warncke, 1985)
- Camptopoeum khuzestanum (Warncke, 1985)
- Camptopoeum kuznetzovi (Cockerell, 1929)
- Camptopoeum longicephalum (Warncke, 1987)
- Camptopoeum mirabile Morawitz, 1875
- Camptopoeum nadigi (Warncke, 1972)
- Camptopoeum nasutum (Spinola, 1838)
- Camptopoeum negevense (Warncke, 1972)
- Camptopoeum nigrotum (Warncke, 1987)
- Camptopoeum pictipes (Morawitz, 1876)
- Camptopoeum pseudorubrum (Warncke, 1987)
- Camptopoeum rubrum (Warncke, 1987)
- Camptopoeum rufiventre Morawitz, 1880
- Camptopoeum sacrum Alfken, 1935
- Camptopoeum samarkandum (Radoszkowski, 1871)
- Camptopoeum schewyrewi Morawitz, 1897
- Camptopoeum simile (Pérez, 1895)
  - Camptopoeum simile scutellare (Pérez, 1895)
  - Camptopoeum simile simile (Pérez, 1895)
- Camptopoeum subflavum (Warncke, 1987)
- Camptopoeum variegatum (Morawitz, 1876)
  - Camptopoeum variegatum berberum (Warncke, 1972)
  - Camptopoeum variegatum graecum (Warncke, 1972)
  - Camptopoeum variegatum israelense (Warncke, 1972)
  - Camptopoeum variegatum kilikae (Warncke, 1972)
  - Camptopoeum variegatum variegatum (Morawitz, 1876)
- Camptopoeum warnckei Patiny, 1999
