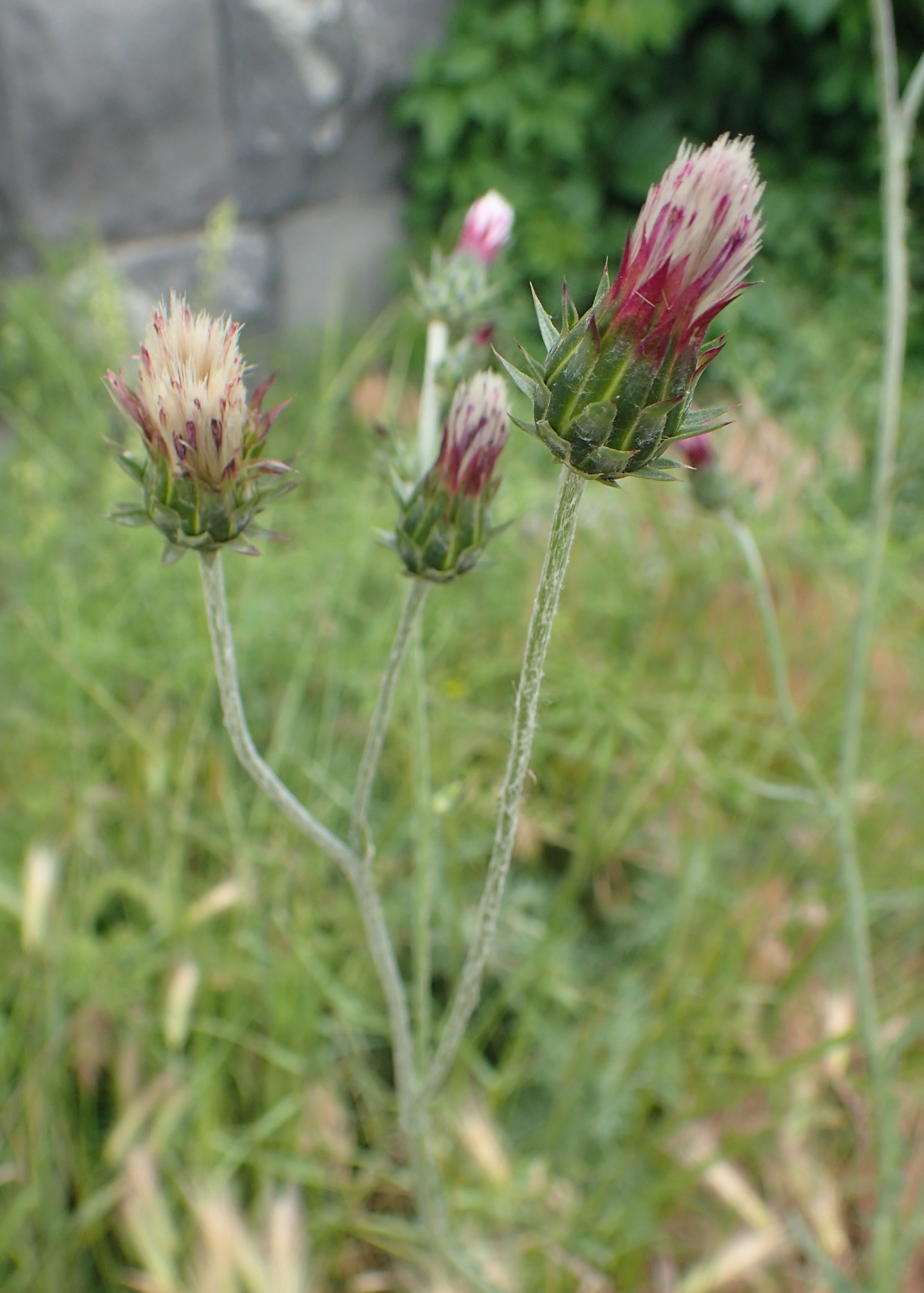
- Carduus arabicus (Arabian thistle)

Scientific classification
- Kingdom: Plantae
- Clade: Embryophytes
- Clade: Tracheophytes
- Clade: Spermatophytes
- Clade: Angiosperms
- Clade: Eudicots
- Clade: Asterids
- Order: Asterales
- Family: Asteraceae
- Genus: Carduus
- Species: C. arabicus

Binomial name
- Carduus arabicus Jacq. ex Murray

= Carduus arabicus =

Arabian thistle

Species of thistle

Carduus arabicus, known as the Arabian thistle, is a biennial plant species of thistle in the family Asteraceae.

== Habitat ==
Grows in Europe (Albania, Greece, Italy [incl. h. Sicily], Ukraine (Crimea), North Caucasus), Asia (Afghanistan, Gulf countries, Iran, Iraq, Lebanon-Syria, Oman, Pakistan, Palestine, Tajikistan, South Caucasus, Turkey [incl. h. European], Turkmenistan), Egypt [in t. h. Sinai].
