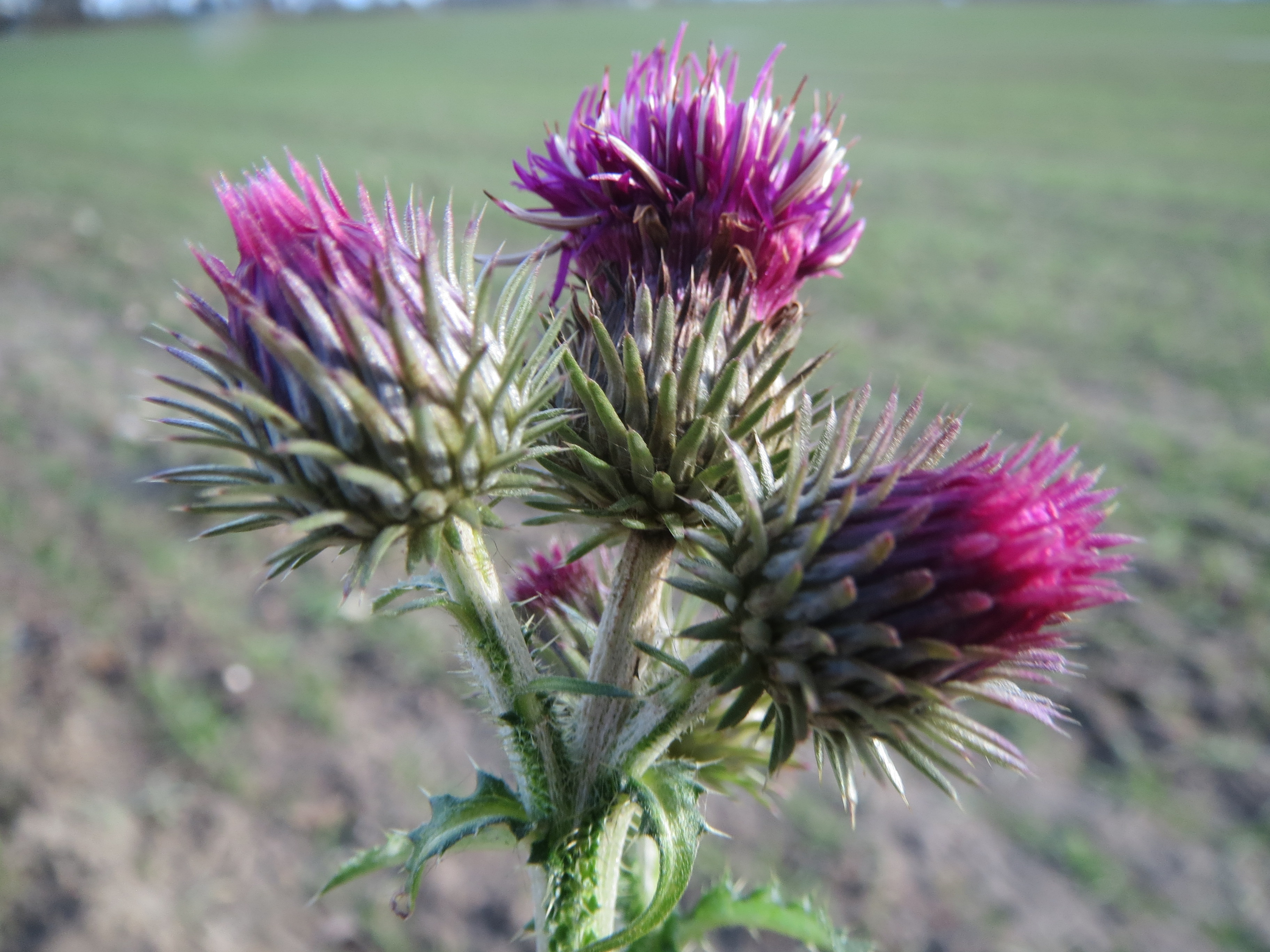
- Carduus acanthoides flower heads

Scientific classification
- Kingdom: Plantae
- Clade: Embryophytes
- Clade: Tracheophytes
- Clade: Spermatophytes
- Clade: Angiosperms
- Clade: Eudicots
- Clade: Asterids
- Order: Asterales
- Family: Asteraceae
- Genus: Carduus
- Species: C. acanthoides

Binomial name
- Carduus acanthoides L.

= Carduus acanthoides =

Species of flowering plant in the daisy family

Carduus acanthoides, known as the spiny plumeless thistle, welted thistle, or plumeless thistle, is a biennial plant species of thistle in the family Asteraceae. The plant is native to Europe and Asia and introduced in many other areas, where it is sometimes considered an invasive species.

== Description ==
Carduus acanthoides may exceed 2 metres (6.6 ft) in height and can form weedy monotypic stands. The stem and foliage are spiny and sometimes woolly. The specific epithet acanthoides refers to its spiny foliage. The plant starts from a flat, basal rosette and then bolts an erect stem with occasional toothed, wrinkled, spiny leaves. The leaves are 4–8 in (10–20 cm) long with lobed or pinnately-divided edges. The abaxial surface (underside) of the leaf is somewhat hairy.

At the top of each branch of the stem is an inflorescence of one to several flower heads, each rounded, covered in spiny phyllaries, and bearing many threadlike, purple or pink disc florets. Each flowerhead is around 0.5–1 in (13–25 mm) across. It flowers throughout the summer and early fall. The achenes are 2–3 mm long, four-angled, with faint lengthwise stripes. The fluffy pappus bristles are 11–13 mm long. After flowering and setting seed, it dies.

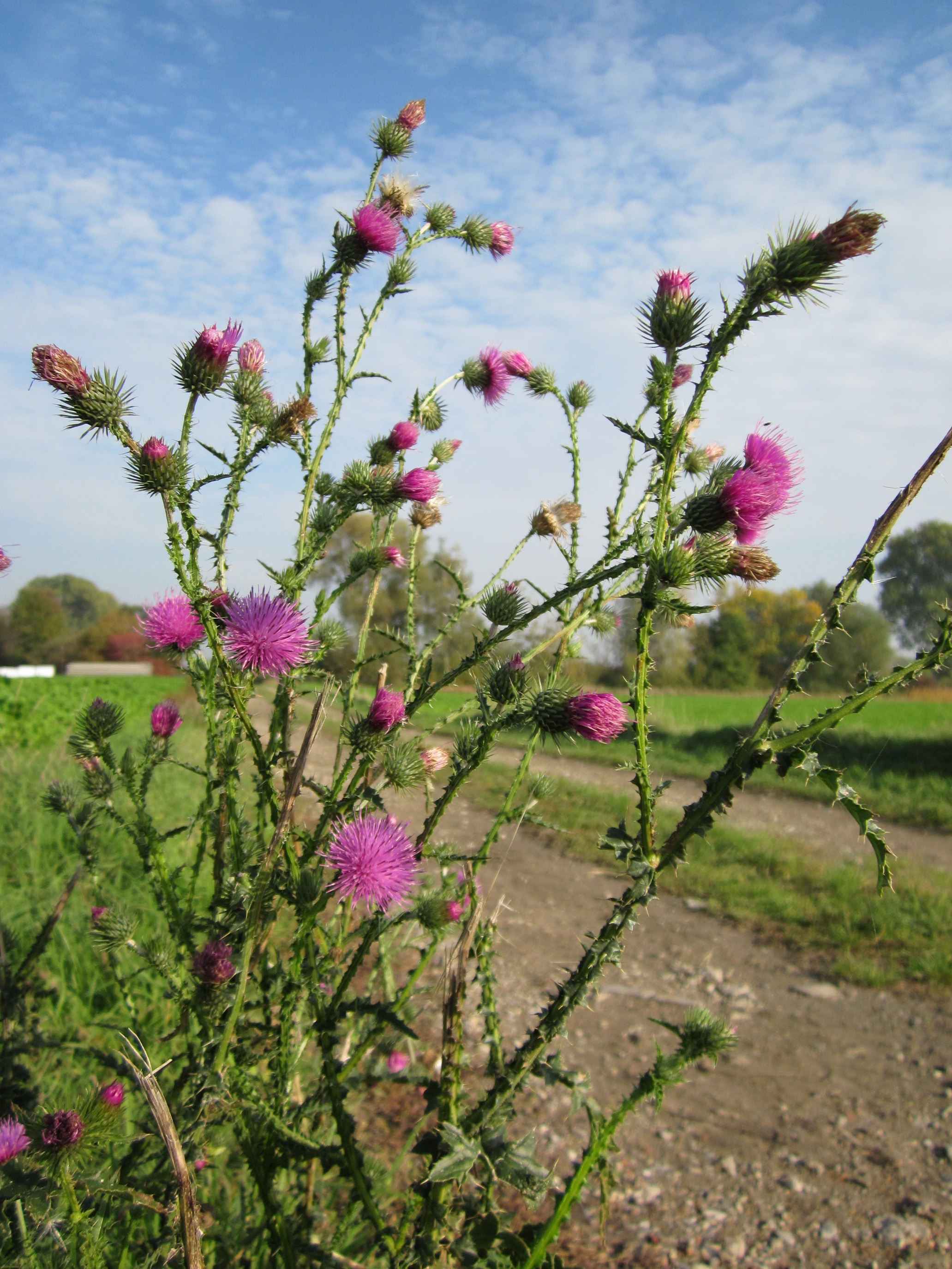
Carduus acanthoides in Germany

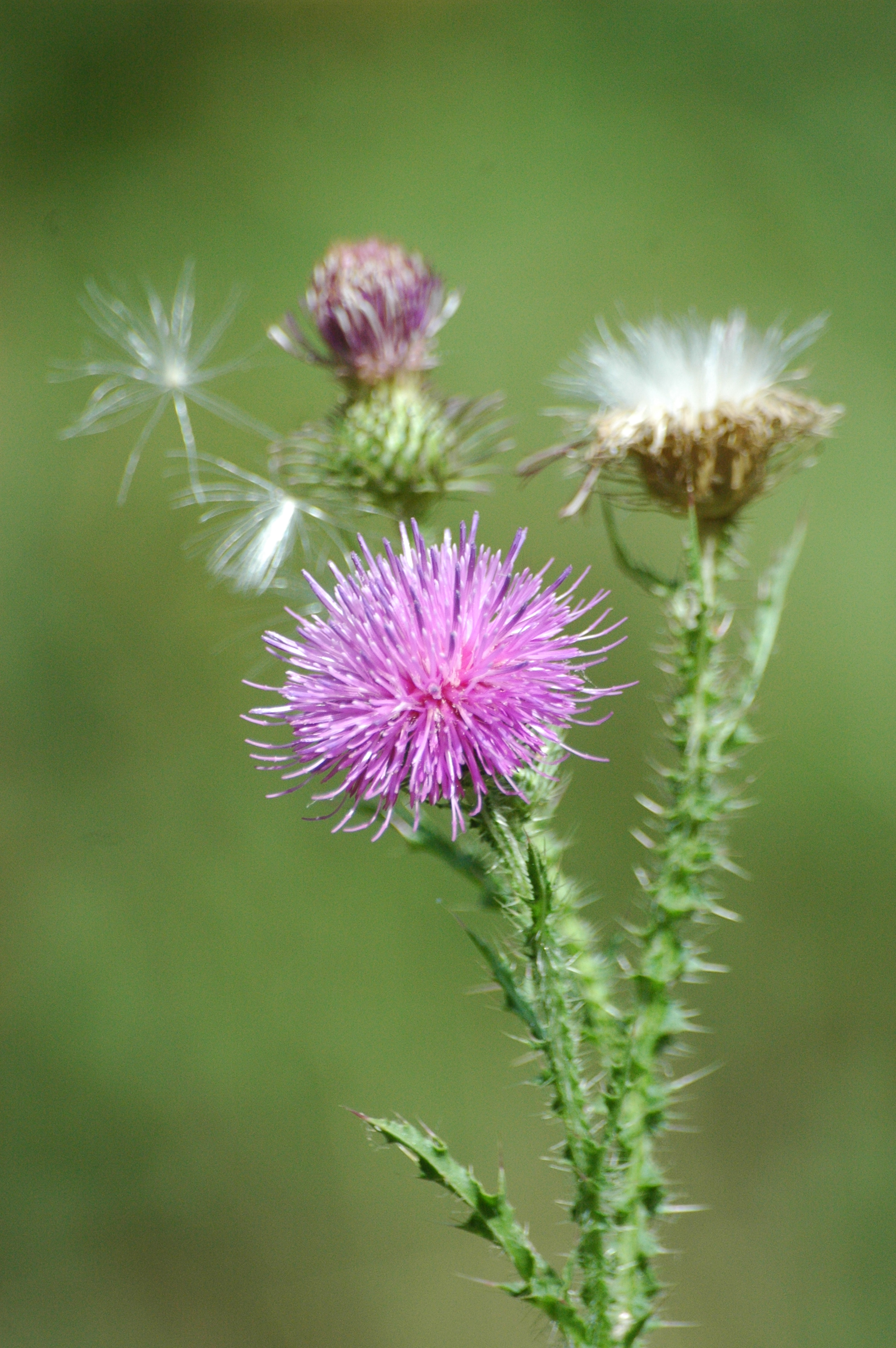
Flowering and fruiting

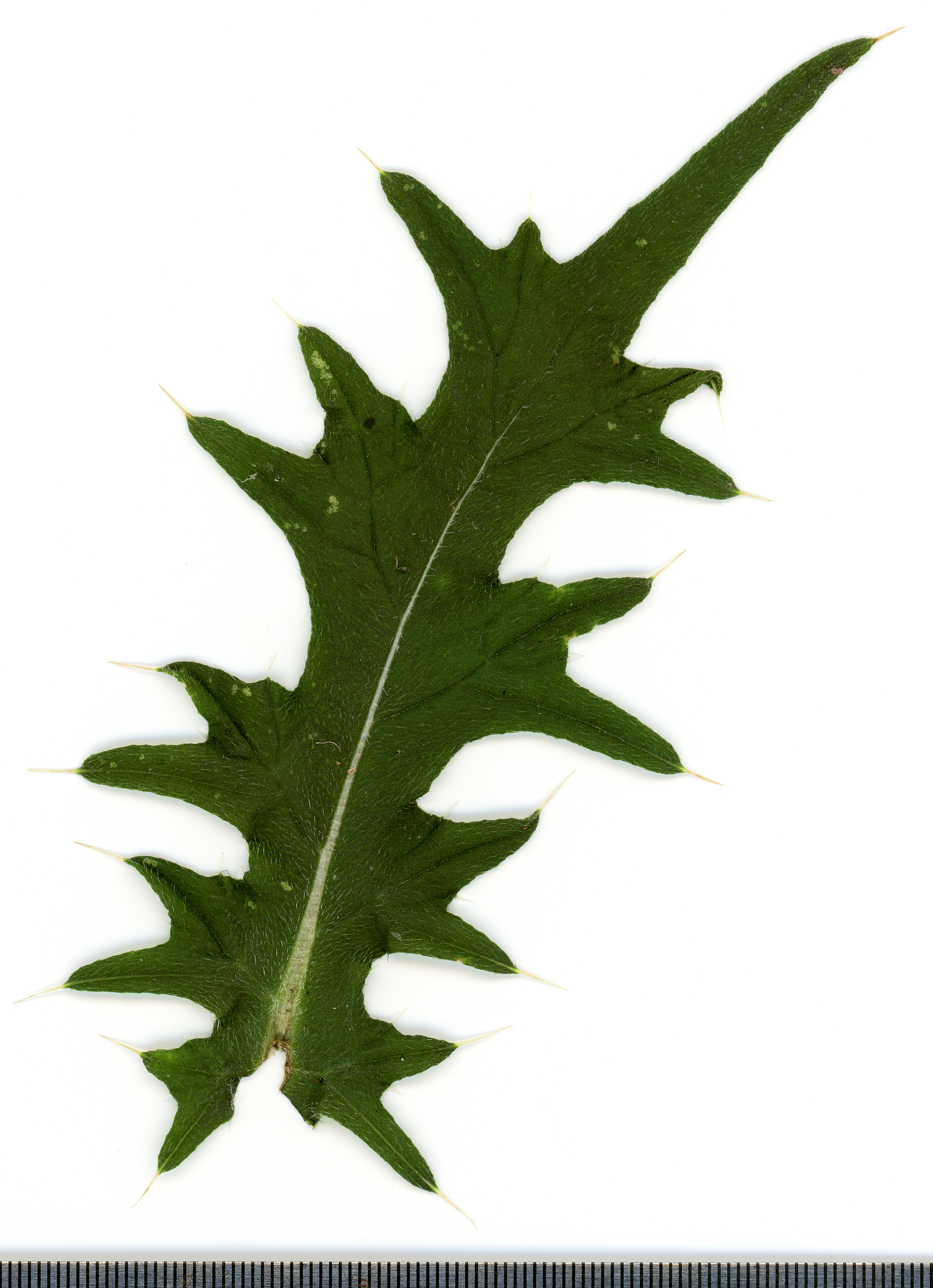
Leaf adaxial side

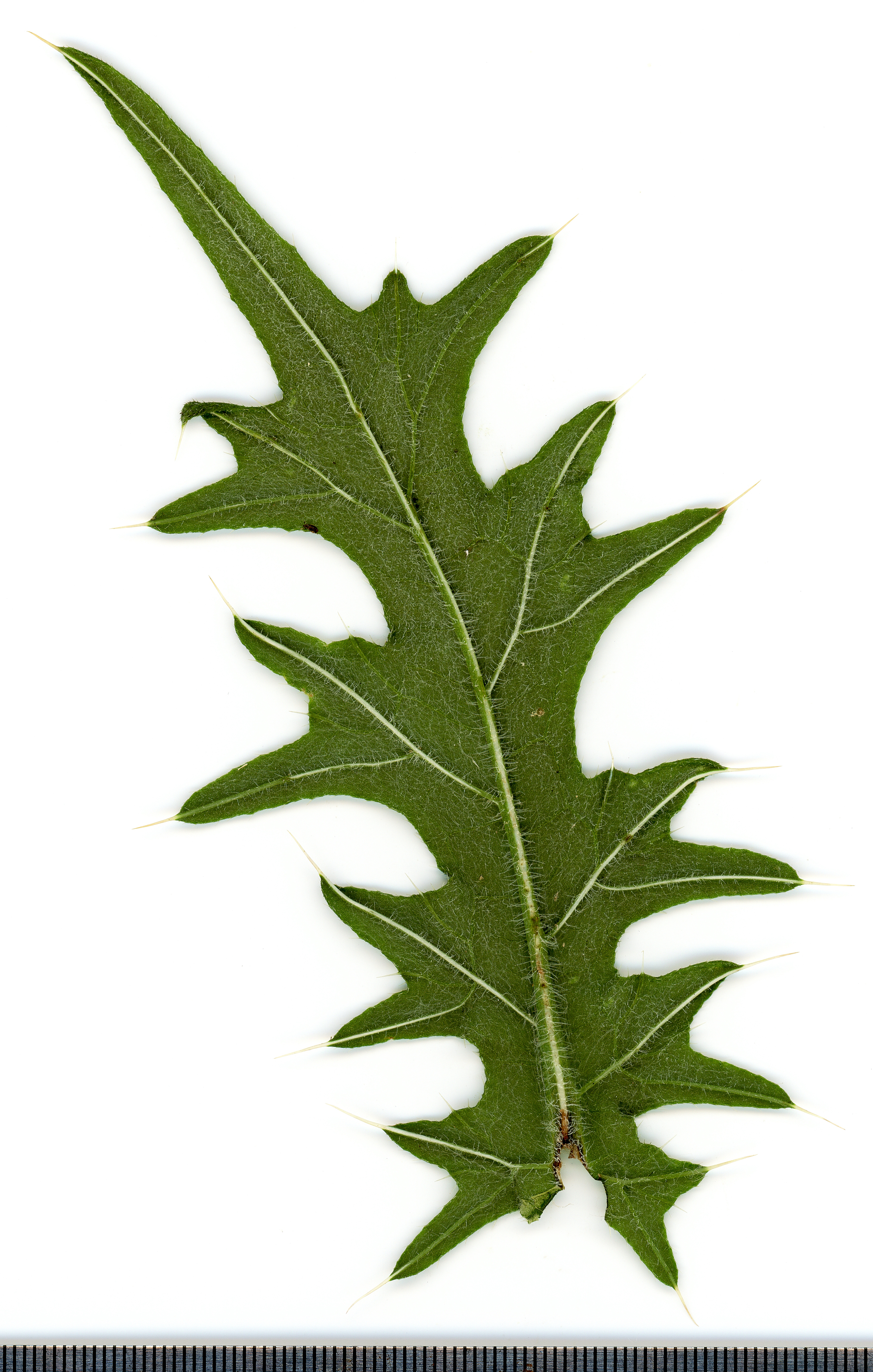
Leaf abaxial side

== Distribution and habitat ==
Carduus acanthoides is native from France, Italy, and western Turkey; through Russia and Kazakhstan; to China. In its native range the plant is found in open grasslands and disturbed areas, and in non-native ranges it is a weed of annual grasslands, roadsides, fields and pastures, and disturbed areas.

The plant has introduced broadly across much of North America where it is sometimes considered a noxious weed or invasive species. The California Department of Food and Agriculture has an active program to control known populations. It spreads through its seeds. Each plant creates around 1,000 seeds. However, the plant has beneficial impacts on the native bees in North America.

Although first noted in 1962 in the Chicago region, it has not been seen since 1985. In Michigan and Wisconsin, it does not occur in remnant, native habitats, but rather those with a history of disturbance, such as railroad right-of-ways, roadsides, and farm fields.
