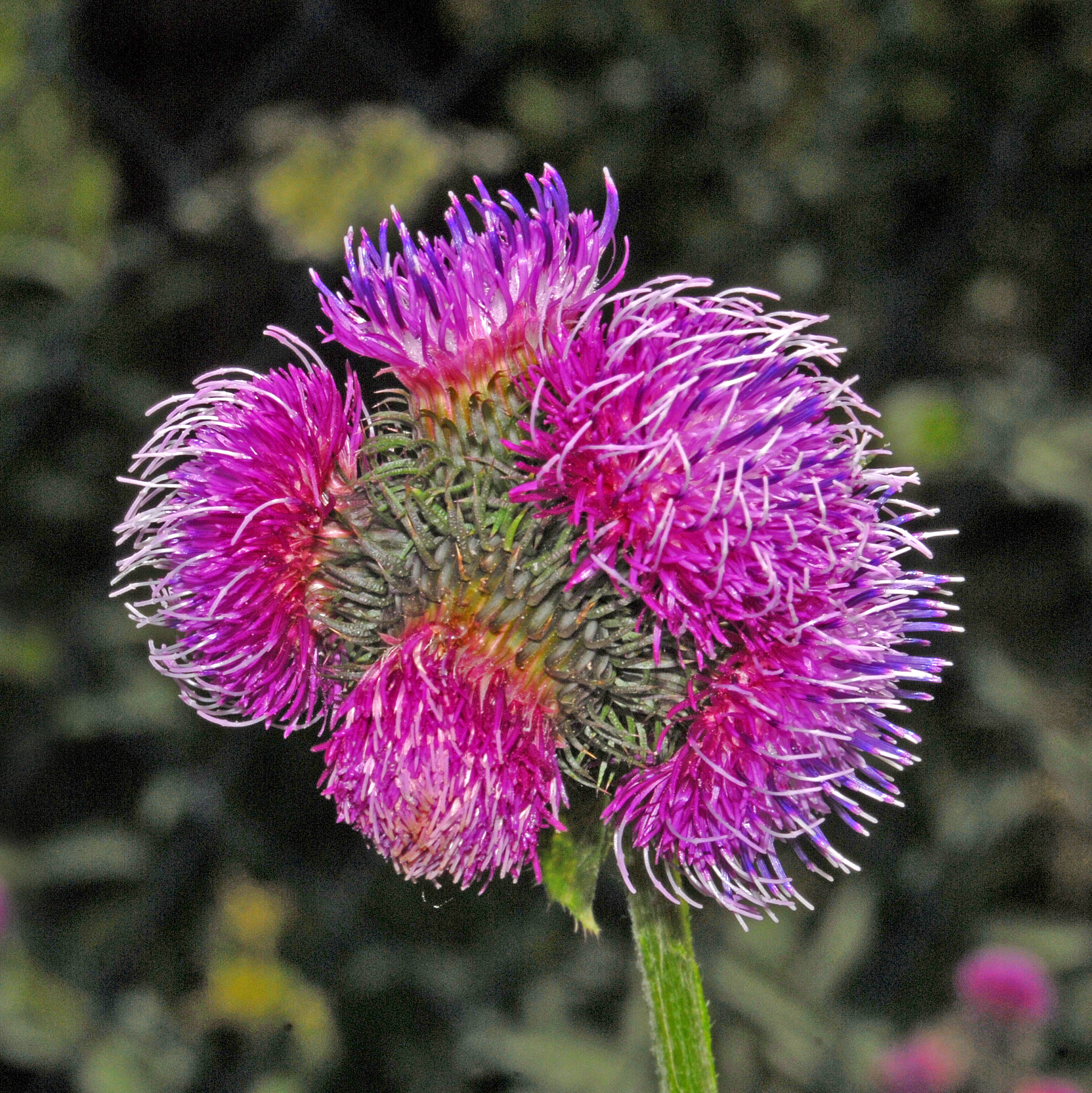
- Close-up on flowers of Carduus personata

Scientific classification
- Kingdom: Plantae
- Clade: Embryophytes
- Clade: Tracheophytes
- Clade: Spermatophytes
- Clade: Angiosperms
- Clade: Eudicots
- Clade: Asterids
- Order: Asterales
- Family: Asteraceae
- Genus: Carduus
- Species: C. personata

Binomial name
- Carduus personata (L.) Jacq., 1776

Synonyms
- Arctium personata L.; Carduus arctioides Vill.; Carduus leucanthemos Schur; Carduus simplicifolius Sanguin

= Carduus personata =

Species of flowering plant in the daisy family

Carduus personata is a perennial herbaceous plant in the family Asteraceae.

== Etymology ==
The genus name Carduus is the classical Latin name for "thistle", also the species name (personata) derives from Latin (personatus = masked).

== Distribution and habitat ==
This species mainly occurs in the mountains of Central Europe, in the Alps, the Apennines, in the Carpathians, in the Sudetes and in the Balkans. These plants prefer various moist and fertile soils (meadows, wet woodlands of mountains, etc.) and environments with debris, in partial shade. They can also be found on the banks of the streams. In the Alps, they can be found at altitudes of 500–2,300 metres (1,600–7,500 ft).

== Description ==
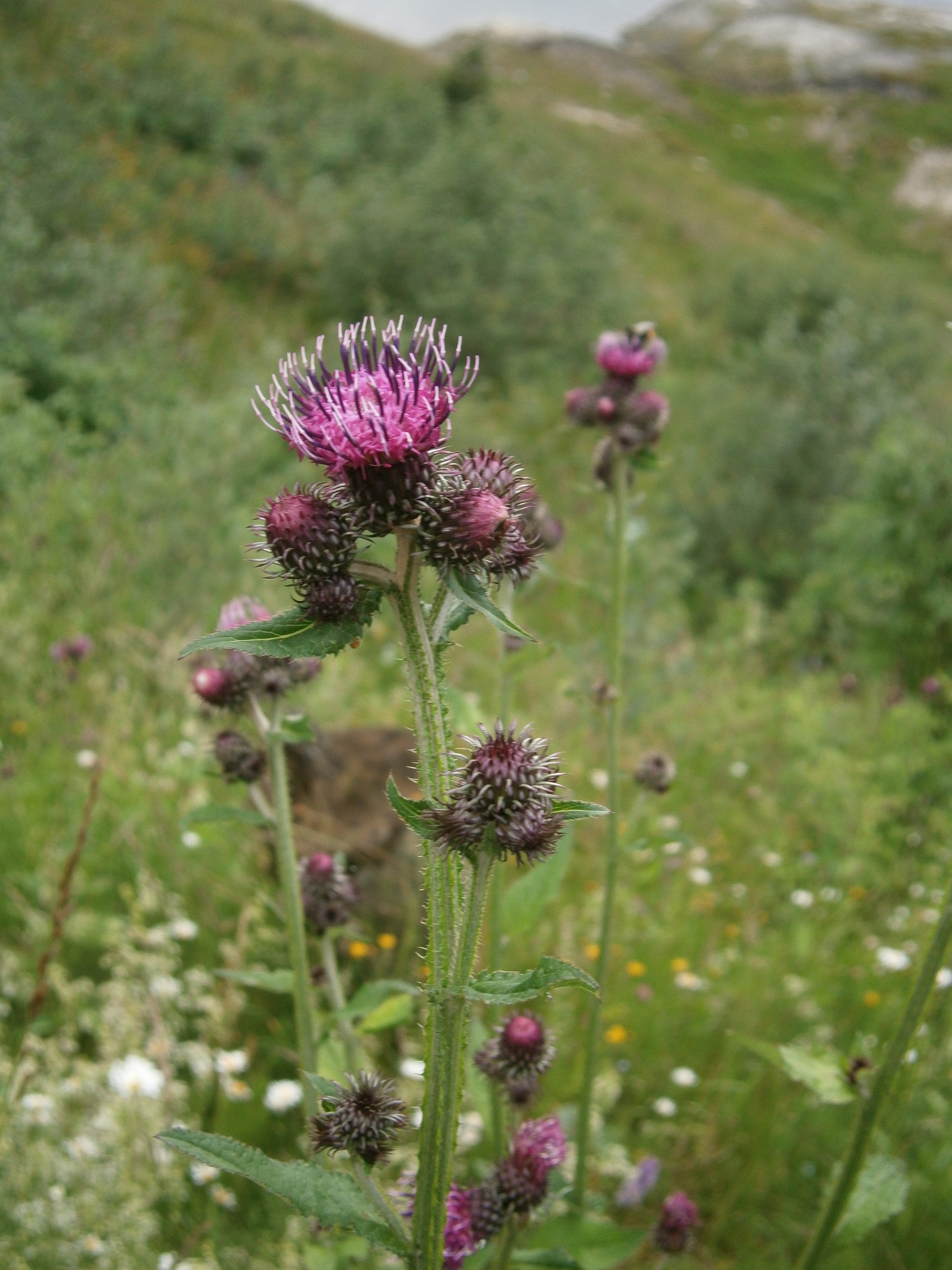
Plant of Carduus personata

Carduus personata has a sturdy stem with short spines and it is approximately 40–160 centimetres (16–63 in) tall. The aerial part of the stem is erect and widely branched upwards. The shape is tubular, striated and ribbed with wings up to the inflorescence. In these plants the thorns are soft and present both on the stem and on the leaves.

Leaves are all cauline and are arranged alternately. They are soft, rather narrow and curly, feather-like, the lower ones broadly-shaped and narrowed in the petiole. Middle and upper leaves cover the stem and are lanceolate or ovate-lanceolate, sessile, serrated on the edges. The upper side of the leaves is bare or slightly pubescent, where as the lower side is grayish-felted. Lower leaves reach a width of 1–2 decimetres (3.9–7.9 in) and a length of 3–4 decimetres (12–16 in), where as the width of the median leaves is of 6–10 centimetres (2.4–3.9 in), with a length of 12–15 centimetres (4.7–5.9 in).

A few sessile flowers (from two to five) are gathered in an inflorescences very close together and even agglomerated, at the top of the stems. The flower heads show a short, leafy peduncle that supports a hemispheric to ovoidal structure, composed of several bracts. Flowers are violet-purple and 2–2.5 centimetres (0.79–0.98 in) in diameter. Both the chalice and the corolla are composed of five elements). Fruits are bright-brown achenes, with a glabrous surface, about 4 mm long.

== Biology ==
These biennial or perennial plants bloom from June to September. Flowers are hermaphroditic. Pollination occurs through insects (entomophily). The seeds fallen to the ground are transported for some meters by the wind due to the pappus (anemochory) are subsequently dispersed by insects, especially by ants (myrmecochory).

== Sources ==
- Funk V.A., Susanna A., Stuessy T.F. and Robinson H., Classification of Compositae-volution-and-Biogeography-of-Compositae.pdf Systematics, Evolution, and Biogeography of Compositae, Vienna, International Association for Plant Taxonomy (IAPT), 2009.
- Joachim W. Kadereit, Charles Jeffrey, Flowering plants: Eudicots; Asterales, New York, Springer, 2007, p. 129, ISBN 3-540-31050-9.
- Giacomo Nicolini, Enciclopedia Botanica Motta., Milano, Federico Motta Editore. Volume 1, 1960, p. 457.
- Sandro Pignatti, Flora d'Italia. Volume 3, Bologna, Edagricole, 1982, p. 146, ISBN 88-506-2449-2.
- D.Aeschimann, K.Lauber, D.M.Moser, J-P. Theurillat, Flora Alpina. Volume 2, Bologna, Zanichelli, 2004, p. 574.
- Alfio Musmarra, Dizionario di botanica, Bologna, Edagricole.
- Strasburger E, Trattato di Botanica. Volume secondo, Roma, Antonio Delfino Editore, 2007, ISBN 88-7287-344-4.
- Judd S.W. et al, Botanica Sistematica - Un approccio filogenetico, Padova, Piccin Nuova Libraria, 2007, ISBN 978-88-299-1824-9.
