= List of trees naturalized in West Virginia =

This is a list of trees naturalized in West Virginia.

- Norway maple (Acer platanoides)
- Sycamore maple (Acer pseudoplatanus)
- Horse-chestnut (Aesculus hippocastanum)
- Tree of heaven (Ailanthus altissima)
- Northern catalpa (Catalpa speciosa)
- European larch (Larix decidua)
- Siberian larch (Larix sibirica)
- Osage orange (Maclura pomifera)
- White mulberry (Morus alba)
- Empress tree (Paulownia tomentosa)
- Norway spruce (Picea abies)
- Blue spruce (Picea pungens)
- Mountain pine (Pinus mugo)
- Black pine (Pinus nigra)
- Scots pine (Pinus sylvestris)
- Chinese elm (Ulmus parvifolia)
