= Lawrence Crute =

American politician

Lawrence C. Crute (died 1930) was a state legislator in Arkansas. He served in the Arkansas House of Representatives in 1873 representing Chicot County.

He is listed in the Arkansas State Land Records in June 1871.

He was elected in a special election November 4, 1873. He donated to the Baptist Home Mission in 1885.

== See also ==
- African American officeholders from the end of the Civil War until before 1900
