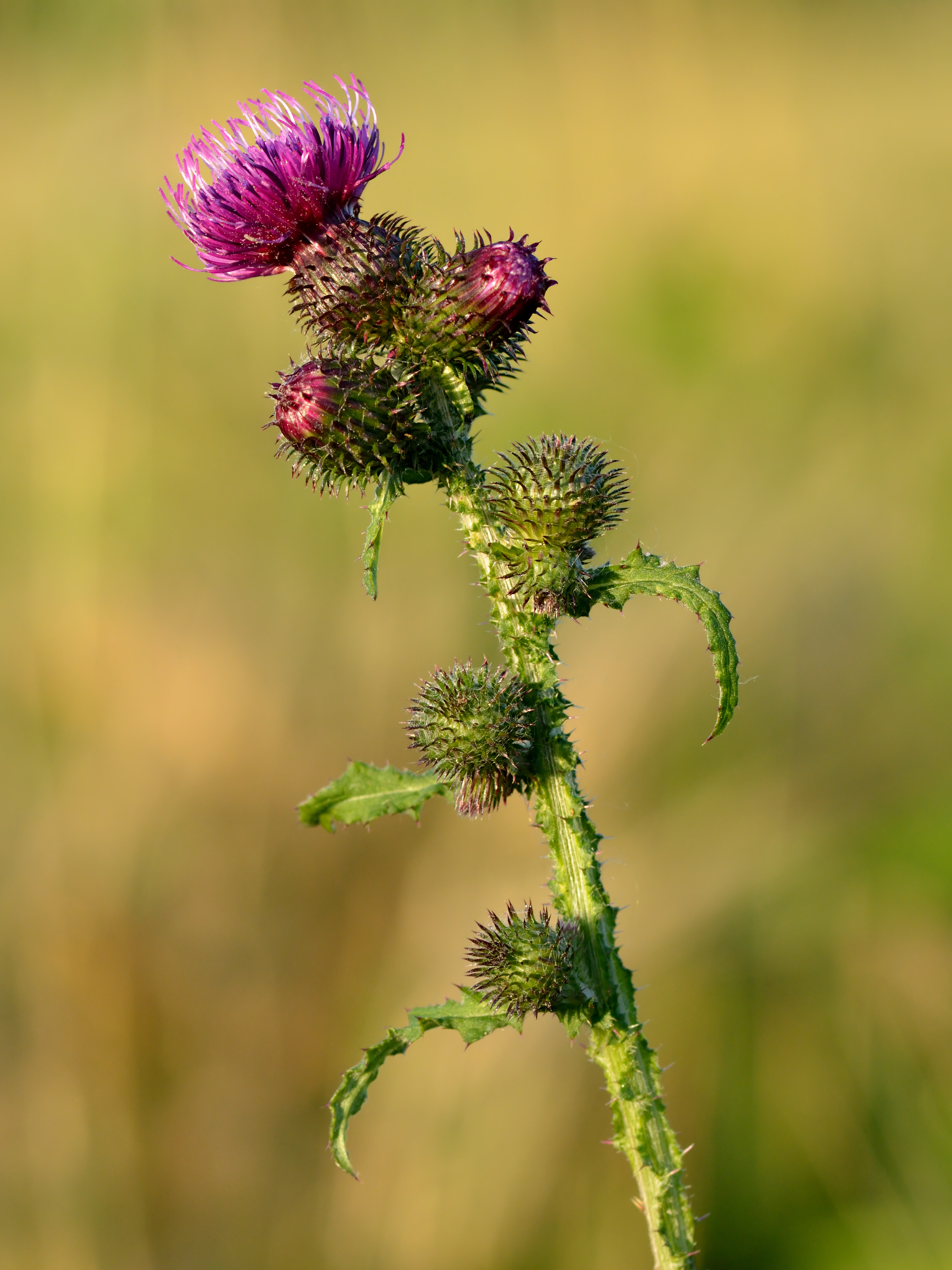

Scientific classification
- Kingdom: Plantae
- Clade: Tracheophytes
- Clade: Angiosperms
- Clade: Eudicots
- Clade: Asterids
- Order: Asterales
- Family: Asteraceae
- Genus: Carduus
- Species: C. crispus

Binomial name
- Carduus crispus L.

= Carduus crispus =

Species of flowering plant in the daisy family

Carduus crispus, the curly plumeless thistle or welted thistle, is a biennial herb in the daisy family Asteraceae. It is native to Eurasia and has been naturalized in North America and India.

== Description ==
Carduus crispus has upright growth, and individuals can grow up to 3 metres (10 ft) tall, with the typical height being 50–180 centimetres (19 1/2–71 in). This species flowers from May and seeds ripen in July. Its main form of seed dispersal is by wind.

The leaves of this plant are simple, alternate and they start at the base of the pant. The leaves cannot be in leaflets, but they can vary between being lobed and unlobed. The blade edges of the leaves can either be toothed, have lobes, or have both. The top of the leaves does not have a lot of hair, while the underside of the leaves has white hair. The size of the leaf blades varies from 10–20 centimetres (4–8 in) in length, and the petioles are winged at the base of the leaves.

Unlike most other members of Asteraceae, this plant does not have any ray-shaped flowers, only disk-shaped flowers, with the head width reaching 15 to 18 millimetres (5/8 to 3/4 in). The colours of the flowers can range from purple to pink and white. The flowers are hermaphrodite, as they have both male and female parts. The flowers are pollinated by insects such as bees.

The type of fruit this species produces is called achenes, and they are yellow or slightly gray and brown in colour. The round-shaped fruit is flattened, and attached to one end are long unbranched hairs that aid wind dispersal.

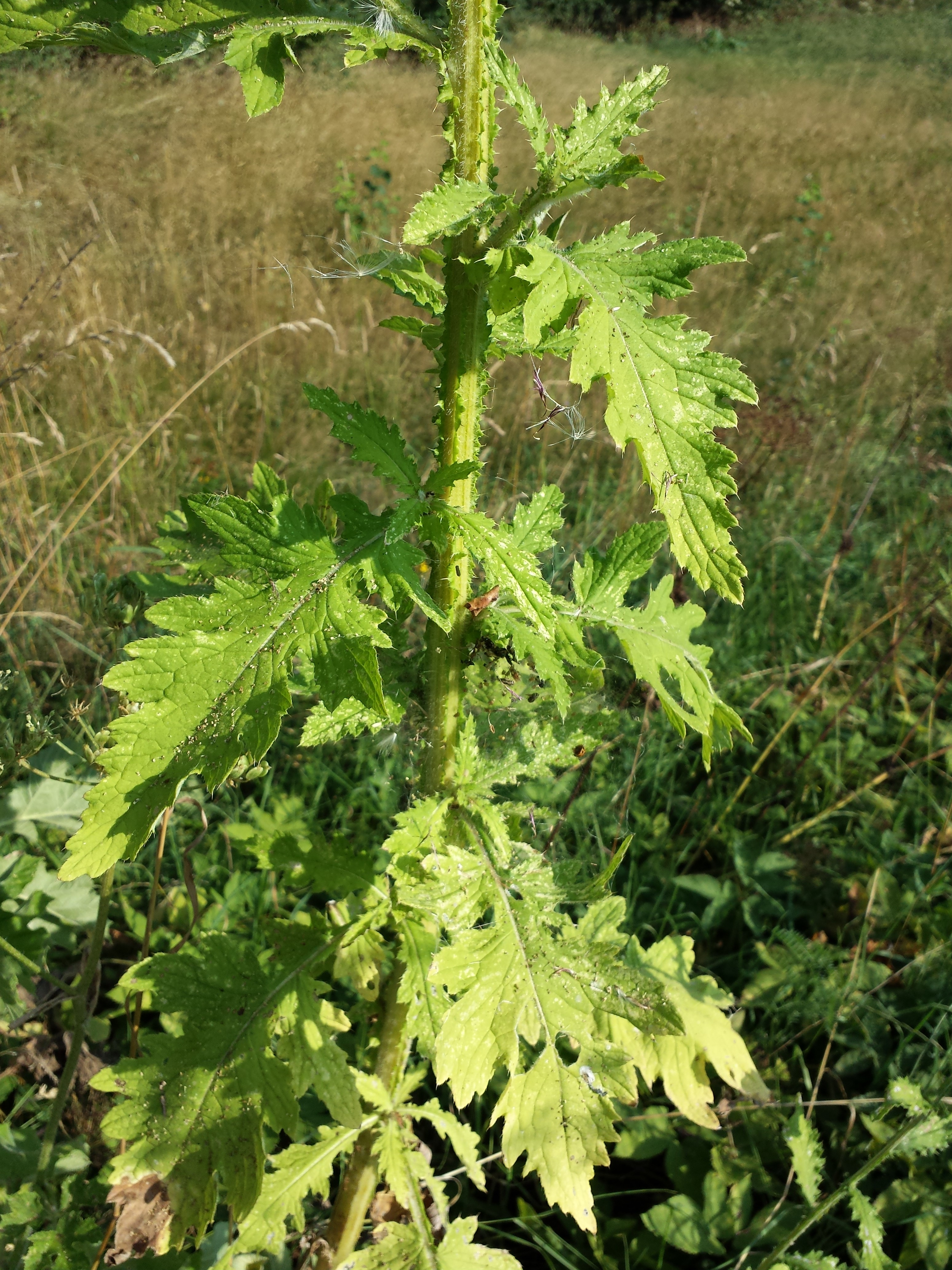
Leaves

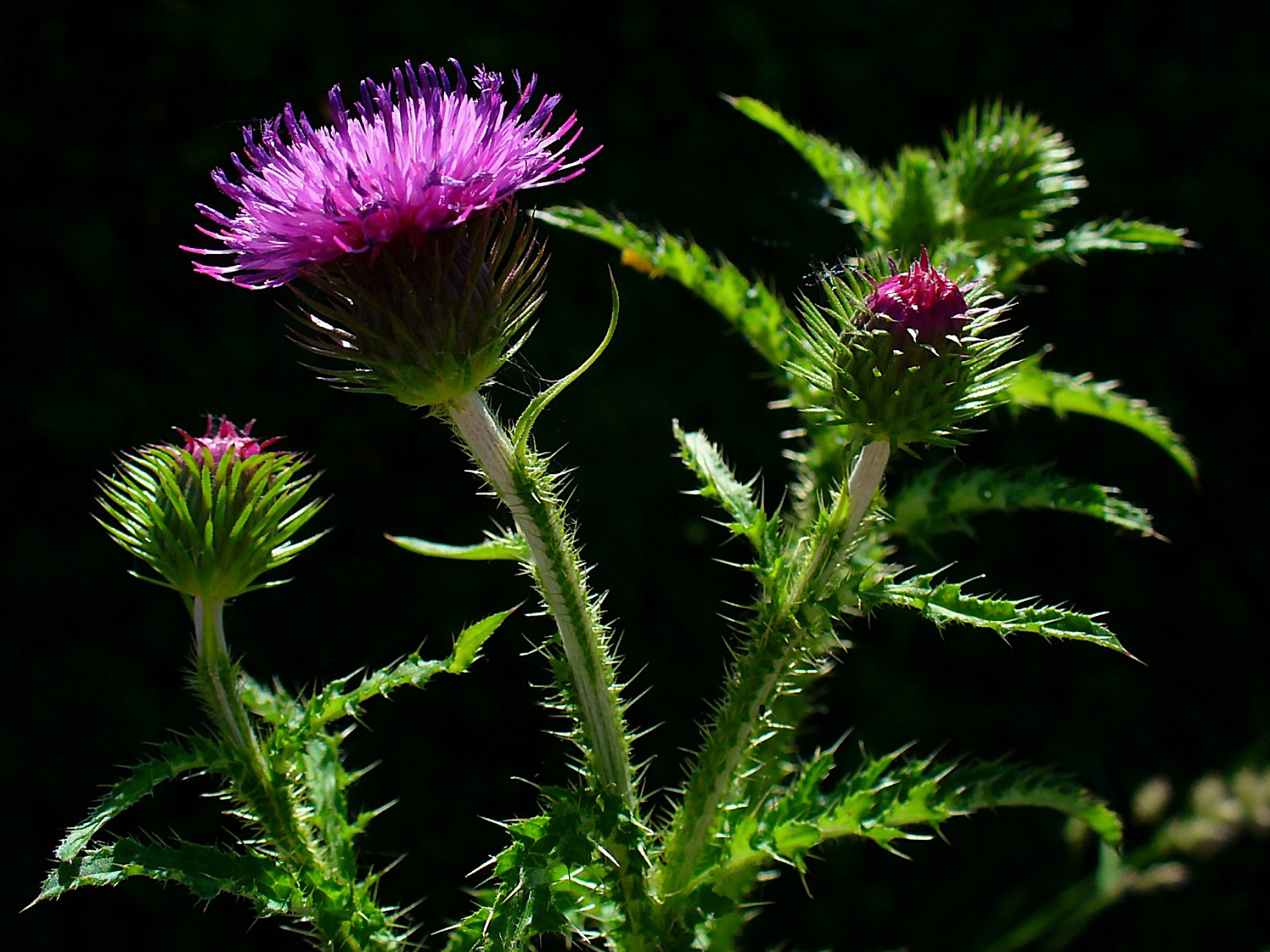
Foliage and flowers

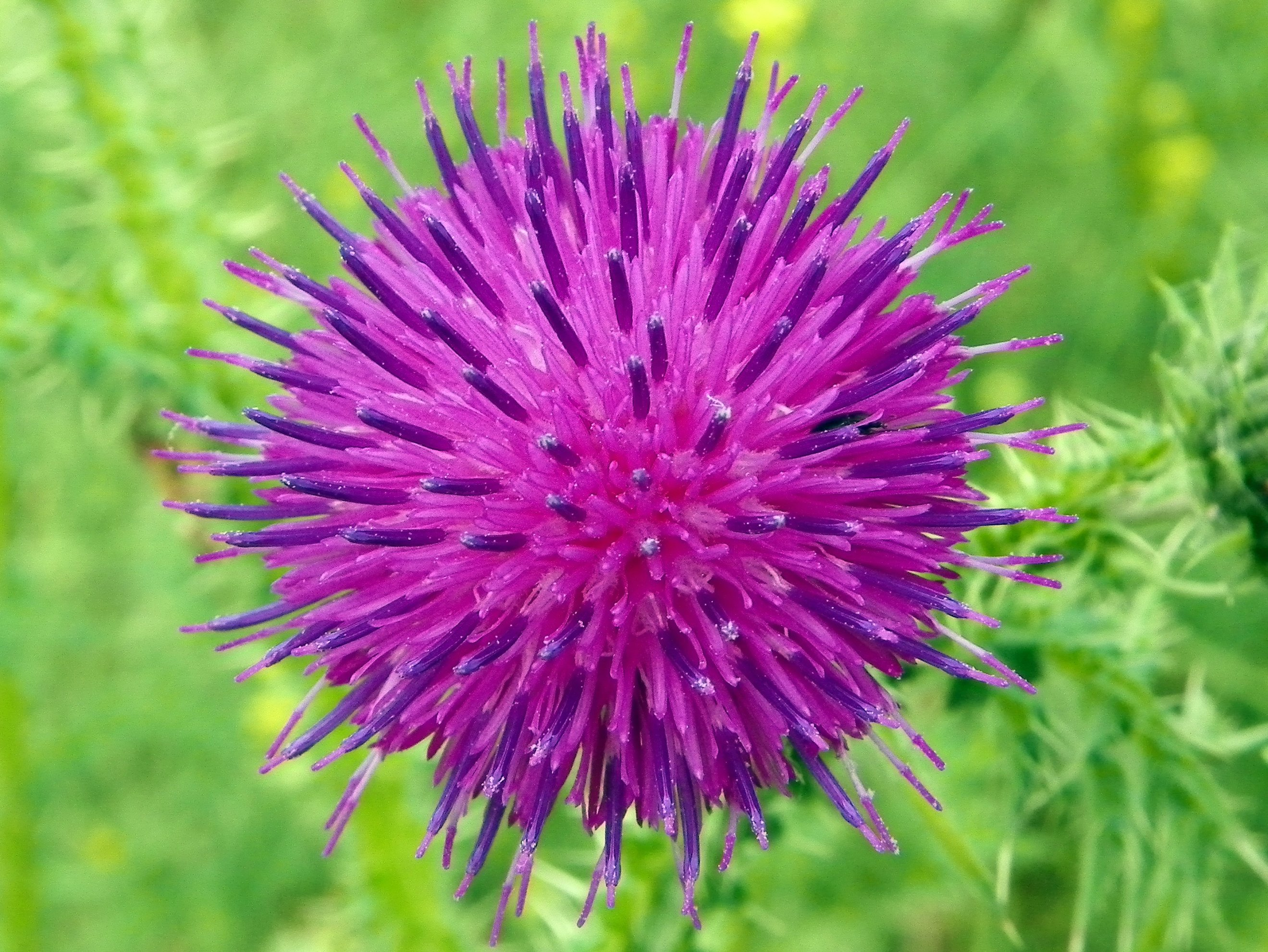
Flower close-up

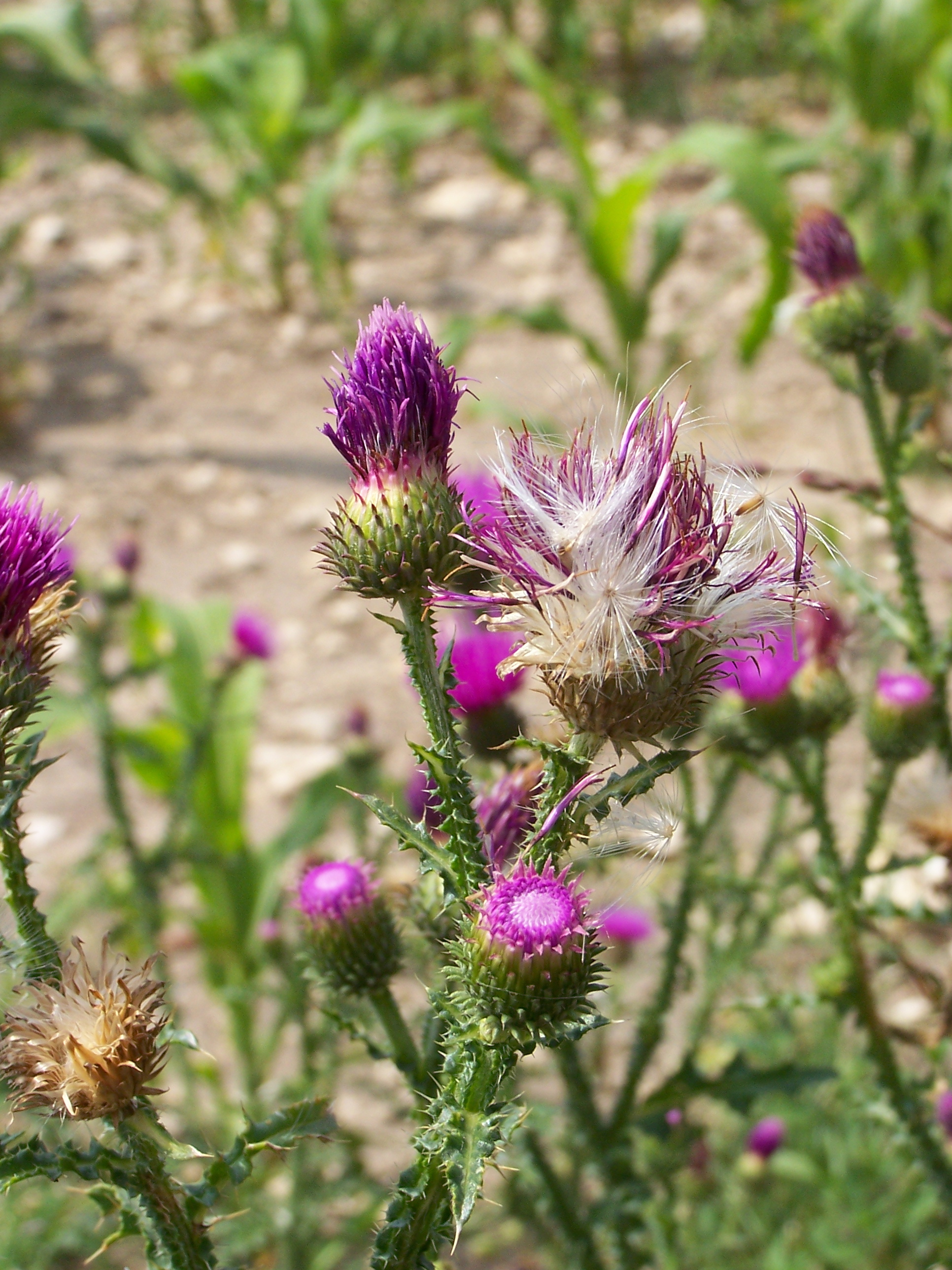
Plant with seed heads

== Etymology ==
The genus Carduus comes from the Latin language, and it means "a kind of thistle", or "thistlelike plant". The specific epithet, crispus, has a Latin origin meaning "curly" or "wavy".

== Distribution ==
Carduus crispus is native to Europe and Asia. Some of the countries in Asia include Armenia, China, and Hebei. C. crispus is naturalized in Greenland, parts of the United States and Canada, and India

== Ecology ==
It needs a lot of sunlight, and therefore is not shade tolerant. The soil must be wet, and have the proper pH for the plant to grow and thrive. This species can also be called a noxious weed in North America, and can be found in areas such as pastures and along the sides of the road.

The species and genus is a favorite food plant of caterpillars of the painted lady butterfly (Vanessa cardui), which derives its specific epithet, cardui, from their preference for Carduus thistles. It is also used by bees for honey production.

== Uses ==
This plant has been found to have anti-tumour properties, the active ingredient is Crispine B, an alkaloid that has cytotoxic properties, meaning that Crispine B is toxic enough to prevent cancer cells from replicating.

The roots of C. crispus are said to have anodyne properties which are pain-killing properties that lessen the pain an organism is experiencing.

== Invasive species ==
Carduus crispus is an introduced species in North America, and a noxious weed in several U.S. states, including West Virginia.
