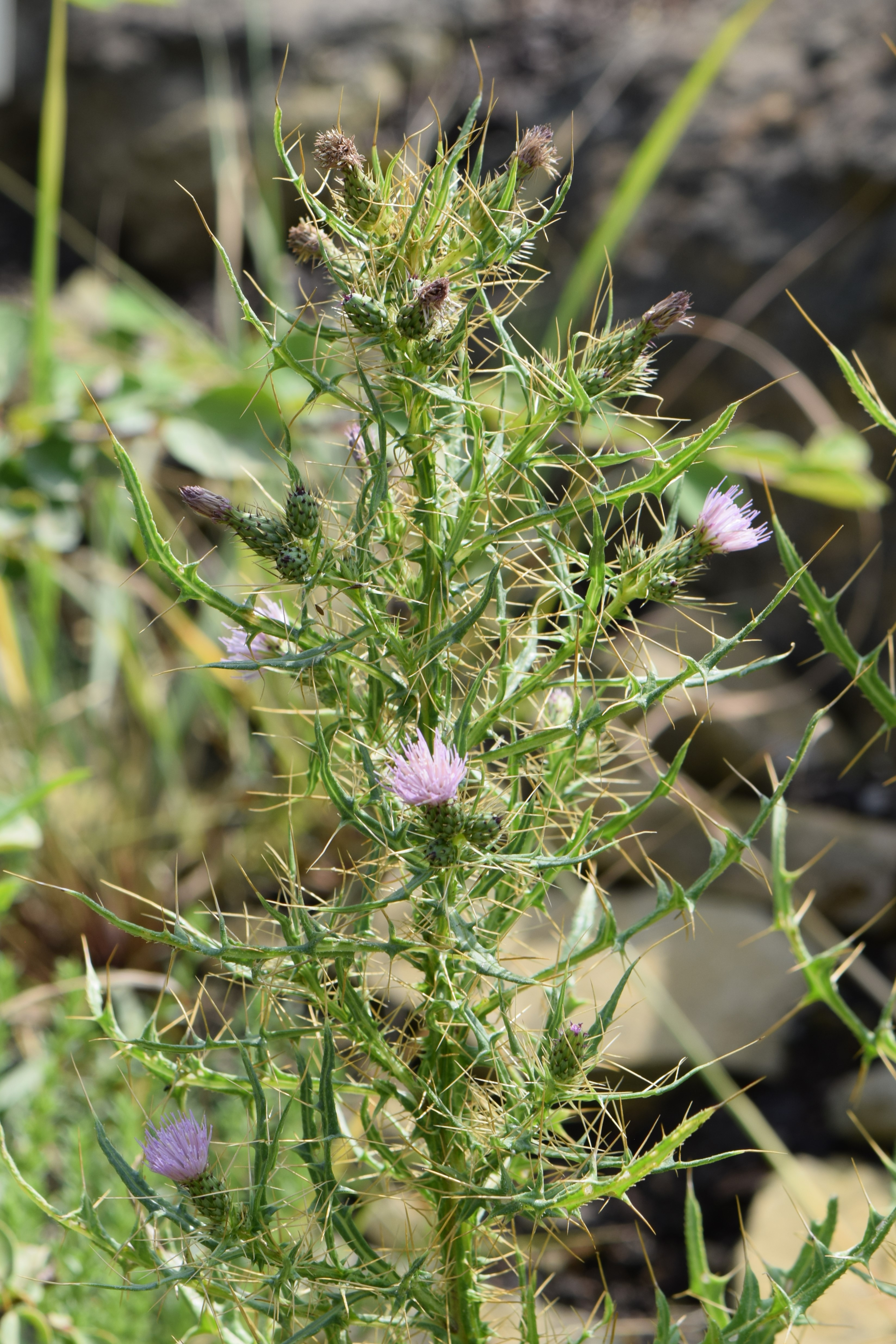

Scientific classification
- Kingdom: Plantae
- Clade: Tracheophytes
- Clade: Angiosperms
- Clade: Eudicots
- Clade: Asterids
- Order: Asterales
- Family: Asteraceae
- Genus: Cirsium
- Species: C. creticum

Binomial name
- Cirsium creticum (Lam.) d'Urv.

Synonyms
- Carduus creticus; Cnicus creticus

= Cirsium creticum =

Species of plant

Cirsium creticum is a species of plant native around the Mediterranean and the Middle East.

== Distribution ==
The species is present to the following places:

- Albania
- Bosnia and Herzegovina
- Bulgaria
- Metropolitan France
  - Occitania(close to Toulouse)
  - Corsica
- Italy (geographical region)
  - Sicily
  - Italian Peninsula
    - Italy
    - San Marino
    - Vatican City
- North Macedonia
- Iran
- Turkey
- Romania
- Greece
- Libya

== Subspecies ==
The species has the following subspecies.

- Cirsium creticum subsp. creticum
- Cirsium creticum subsp. gaillardotii
- Cirsium creticum subsp. triumfettii
