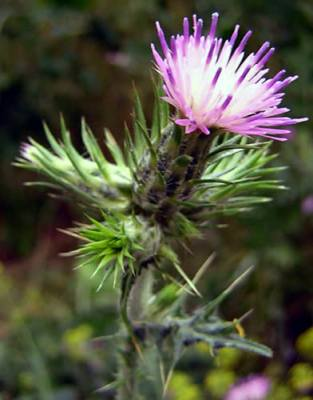

Scientific classification
- Kingdom: Plantae
- Clade: Tracheophytes
- Clade: Angiosperms
- Clade: Eudicots
- Clade: Asterids
- Order: Asterales
- Family: Asteraceae
- Genus: Carduus
- Species: C. tenuiflorus

Binomial name
- Carduus tenuiflorus Curtis

= Carduus tenuiflorus =

Species of flowering plant in the daisy family

Carduus tenuiflorus is a species of flowering plant in the family Asteraceae. It is known variously as slender-flower thistle, sheep thistle, shore thistle, slender thistle, winged plumeless thistle, winged slender thistle and winged thistle. It is native to western Europe and Northwest Africa, and is an introduced species elsewhere.

== Description ==
Carduus tenuiflorus may exceed 2 metres (6.6 ft) in height. Its tall stem is ridged with wings and has long spines which may be several centimeters in length. The dull olive-green leaves are lobed and wrinkled and may fold and crease themselves.

The inflorescences may hold up to 20 flower heads which are somewhat rounded, covered in wide, spiny phyllaries, and packed with pale pink to bright purple long-tubed disc florets. This is a tenacious weed of roadsides, fields, and disturbed areas.

== Distribution ==
Carduus tenuiflorus is native to western North Africa in: northern Algeria, Morocco, and Tunisia; Macaronesia; and much of western Europe in: Belgium, France, including Corsica, Ireland, Italy including Sardinia and Sicily, the Netherlands, Portugal, Spain including the Balearic Islands, and the United Kingdom.

=== Introduced species ===
It has become naturalised in South Africa, India, Australasia, Southern South America, regions of the United States, and elsewhere. It is an invasive species in California.
