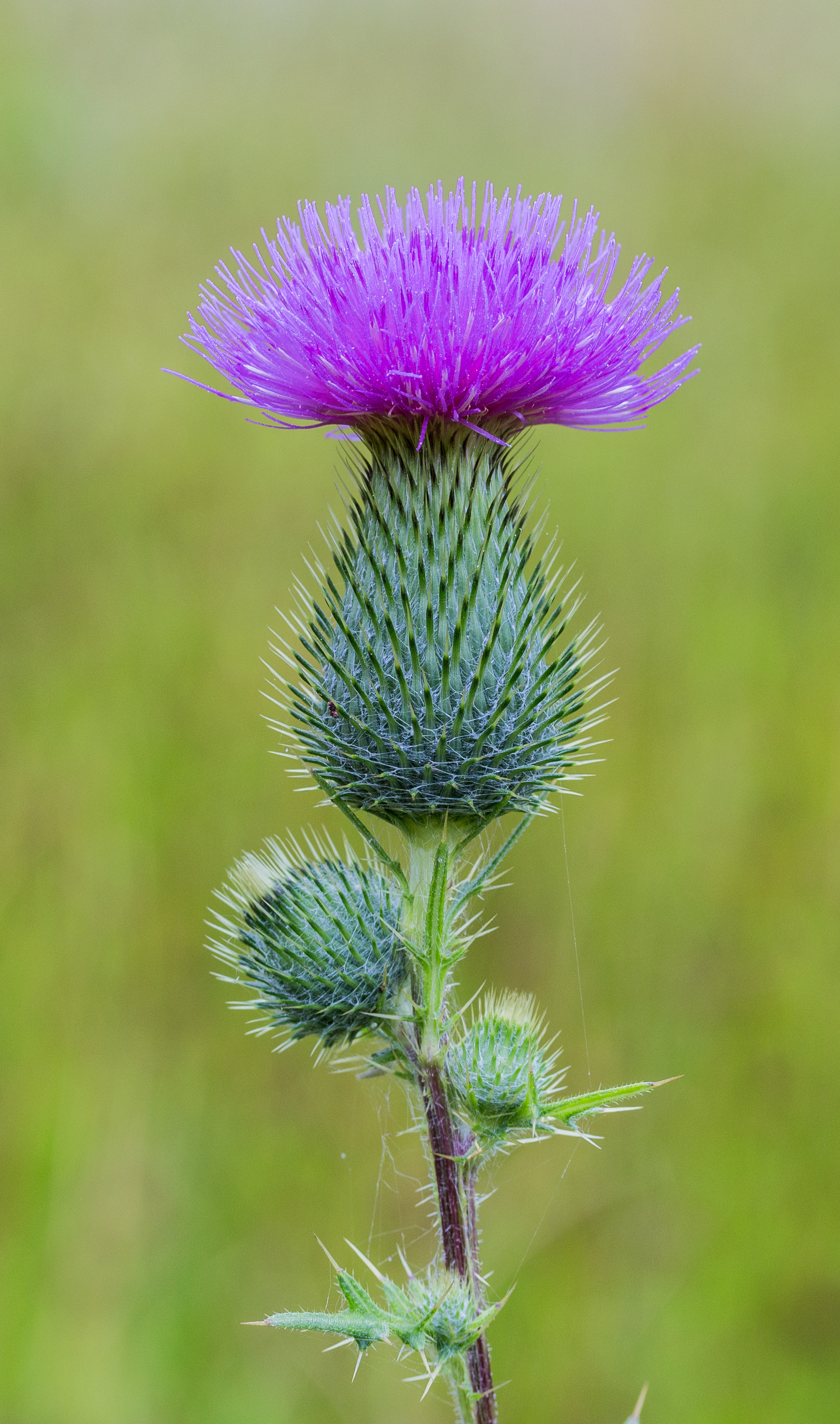
- Plant in flower, Joure, Netherlands
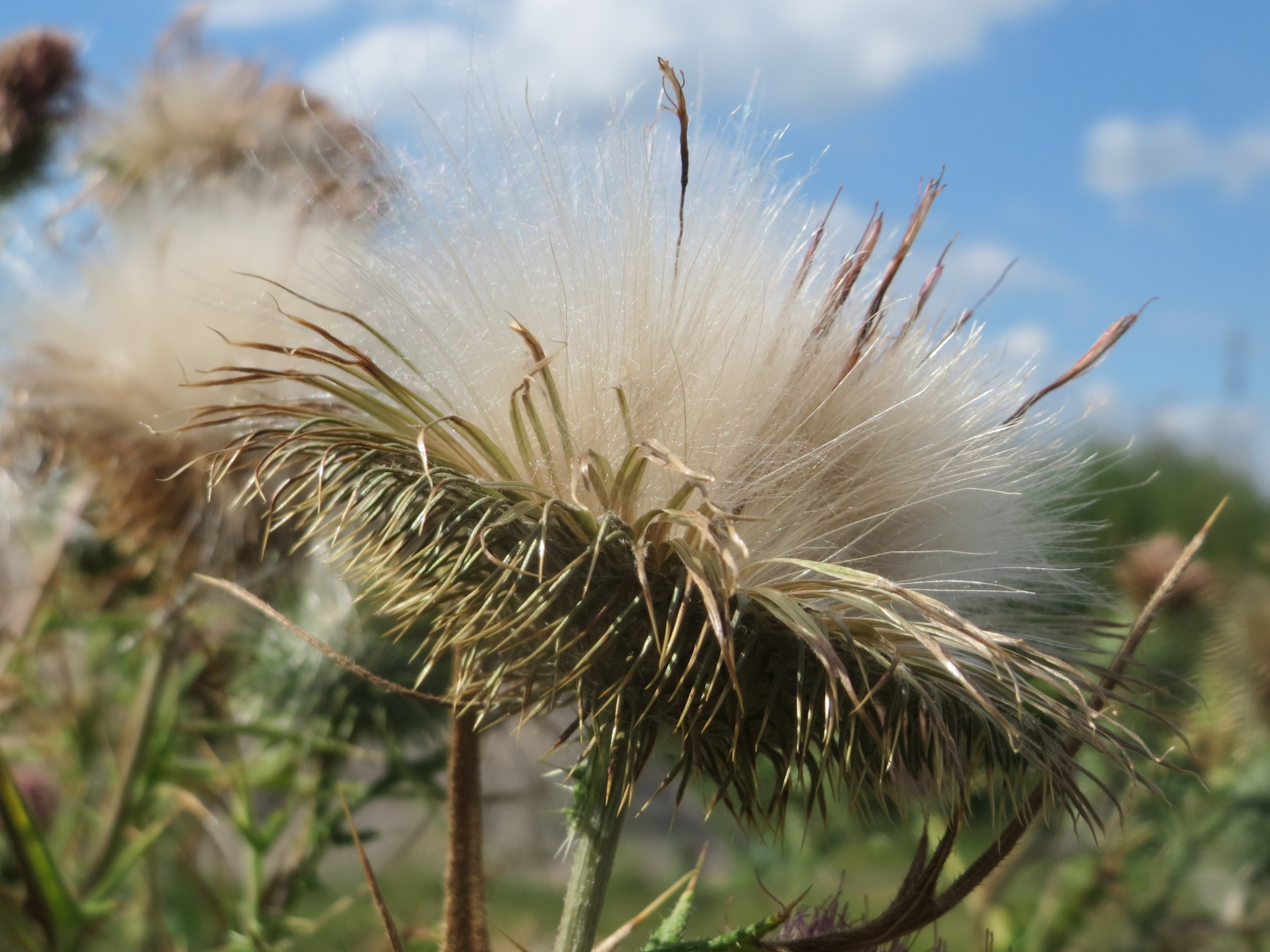
- Seedhead

Scientific classification
- Kingdom: Plantae
- Clade: Embryophytes
- Clade: Tracheophytes
- Clade: Spermatophytes
- Clade: Angiosperms
- Clade: Eudicots
- Clade: Asterids
- Order: Asterales
- Family: Asteraceae
- Genus: Cirsium
- Species: C. vulgare

Binomial name
- Cirsium vulgare (Savi) Ten.

Subspecies and varieties
- Cirsium vulgare subsp. crinitum (Boiss. ex DC.) Arènes; Cirsium vulgare var. litorale P.D.Sell; Cirsium vulgare subsp. silvaticum (Tausch) Arènes; Cirsium vulgare subsp. vulgare

Synonyms
- Synonymy: Ascalea lanceata Hill; Ascalea lanceolata (L.) Hill; Carduus divaricatus Gllib.; Carduus firmus Steud.; Carduus lanceolatus L.; Carduus vulgaris Savi; Chamaepeuce firma DC.; Cirsium abyssinicum Sch.Bip. ex A.Rich.; Cirsium auriculatum Camus ex Beleze; Cirsium balearicum Willk.; Cirsium britannicum Scop.; Cirsium dubium Lojac.; Cirsium firmum (C.Presl) Arcang.; Cirsium fraternum DC.; Cirsium lanceolatum (L.) Scop.; Cirsium lanigerum Nägeli; Cirsium leucanicum Lojac.; Cirsium linkii Nyman; Cirsium longespinosum Tod. ex Nyman; Cirsium microcephalum Lange; Cirsium mielichhoferi Saut.; Cirsium misilmerense Ces., Pass. & Gibelli; Cirsium nemorale Rchb.; Cirsium spurium Delastre; Cirsium strigosum (Hoffmanns. & Link) Cout.; Cnicus firmus J.Presl & C.Presl; Cnicus lanceolatus (L.) Willd.; Cnicus misilmerensis Tineo ex Ces., Pass. & Gibelli; Cnicus strigosus Hoffmanns. & Link; Cynara lanceata Stokes; Eriolepis lanceolata (L.) Cass.; Lophiolepis dubia Cass.; Cirsium atticum Sch.Bip. ex Nyman; Cirsium balearicum (Willk.) Porta; Cirsium crinitum Boiss. ex DC.; Carduus nemoralis E.H.L.Krause; Cirsium silvaticum Tausch

= Cirsium vulgare =

Species of flowering plant in the daisy family

Cirsium vulgare, commonly known as spear thistle, bull thistle, or common thistle, is a species of the Asteraceae genus Cirsium, native throughout most of Europe (north to 66°N, locally 68°N), Western Asia (east to the Yenisei Valley), and northwestern Africa (Atlas Mountains). It is also naturalised in North America, Africa, and Australia and is an invasive weed in several regions. It is the national flower of Scotland.

The plant provides a great deal of nectar for pollinators. It was rated in the top 10 for most nectar production (nectar per unit cover per year) in a UK plants survey conducted by the AgriLand project which is supported by the UK Insect Pollinators Initiative. Marsh thistle, Cirsium palustre, was ranked in first place while this thistle was ranked in sixth place. It also was a top producer of nectar sugar in another study in Britain, ranked third with a production per floral unit of (2300 ± 400 μg).

== Description ==
It is a tall biennial or short-lived monocarpic thistle, forming a rosette of leaves and a taproot up to 70 cm (28 in) long in the first year, and a flowering stem 1–1.5 m (3 ft 4 in – 4 ft 11 in) tall in the second (rarely third or fourth) year. It can grow up to 1.8 metres (5 ft 11 in) tall. It sometimes will function as an annual, flowering in the first year. The stem is winged, with numerous longitudinal spine-tipped wings along its full length. The leaves are stoutly spined, grey-green, deeply lobed; the basal leaves grow up to 30 centimetres (12 in) long, with smaller leaves on the upper part of the flower stem; the leaf lobes are spear-shaped (from which the English name derives). The inflorescence is 2.5–5 centimetres (1–2 in) diameter, pink-purple, with all the florets of similar form (no division into disc and ray florets). The seeds are 5 millimetres (0.2 in) long, with a downy pappus, which assists in wind dispersal. As in other species of Cirsium (but unlike species in the related genus Carduus), the pappus hairs are feathery with fine side hairs.

== Ecology ==
Spear thistle is often a ruderal species, colonising bare disturbed ground, but also persists well on heavily grazed land as it is unpalatable to most grazing animals. Nitrogen-rich soils help increase its proliferation. The flowers are a rich nectar source used by numerous pollinating insects, including honey bees, wool-carder bees, and many butterflies. The seeds are eaten by goldfinches, linnets and greenfinches. The seeds are dispersed by wind, mud, water, and possibly also by ants; they do not show significant long-term dormancy, most germinating soon after dispersal and only a few lasting up to four years in the soil seed bank. Seed is also often spread by human activity such as hay bales.

=== Weed status ===
Spear thistle is designated an "injurious weed" under the UK Weeds Act 1959, and a noxious weed in Australia and in nine US states. Spread is only by seed, not by root fragments as in the related creeping thistle C. arvense. It is best cleared from land by hoeing and deep cutting of the taproot before seeds mature; regular cultivation also prevents its establishment.

Despite this label, the plant has beneficial qualities beyond its very high nectar production. It produces seeds eaten by the American goldfinch, down from seed pods that is used by those birds for nesting material. However, despite this serving generalist pollinators and animals, in America it is highly recommended to plant native thistles and other plants as it can wreak havoc on natural ecosystems.

== Other names ==
Common names include bull thistle, Scots, Scottish, or Scotch thistle, and common thistle.

== Uses ==
The stems can be peeled (removing their spiny surfaces) and then steamed or boiled. They are often pickled in cajun cuisine. The tap roots can be eaten raw or cooked, but are only palatable on young thistles that have not yet flowered. The dried florets steeped in water are used in rural Italy for curdling goats' milk in preparation for making cheese. In Iran, cleaned stems are used in the dish Khoresh-e-Kangar (thistle stem stew).

== In culture ==
The plant features in some Scottish ceremonies such as the "Riding of the Marches", held annually in Langholm in July. The 1992 specimen measured six feet in length.

Spear thistle is also the emblem of Newton Regis in England.
