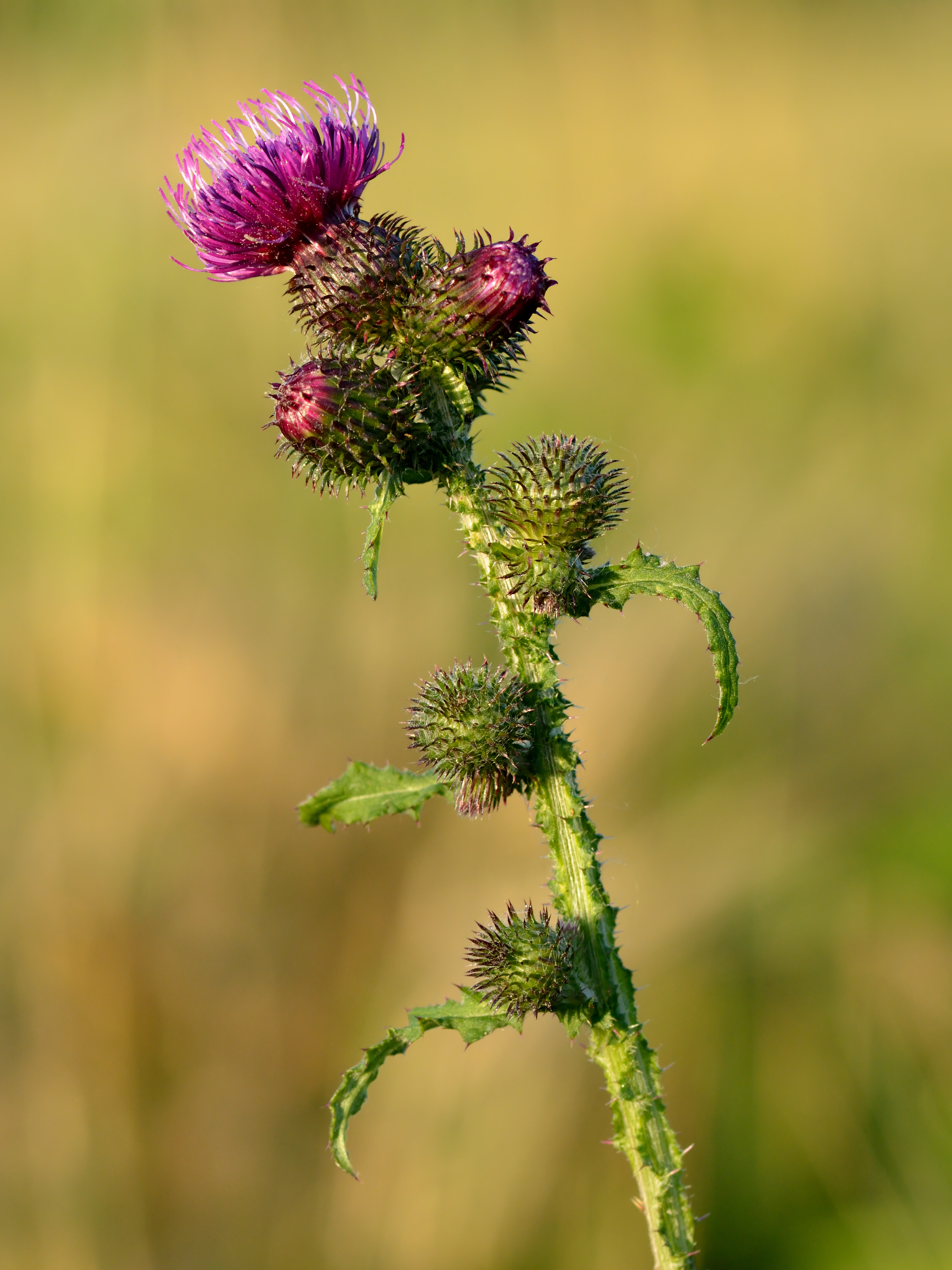
- Carduus crispus

Scientific classification
- Kingdom: Plantae
- Clade: Embryophytes
- Clade: Tracheophytes
- Clade: Spermatophytes
- Clade: Angiosperms
- Clade: Eudicots
- Clade: Asterids
- Order: Asterales
- Family: Asteraceae
- Subfamily: Carduoideae
- Tribe: Cardueae
- Subtribe: Carduinae
- Genus: Carduus; L.

Species
- 90+, see text

Synonyms
- Clavena DC. (1838); Clomium Adans. (1763); Onopyxus Bubani (1899), nom. superfl.; Orthocentron Cass. (1825); Polycantha Hill (1762); Pternix Hill (1762)

= Carduus =

Genus of flowering plants in the daisy family

Carduus is a genus of flowering plants in the family Asteraceae, and the tribe Cardueae, one of two genera considered to be true thistles, the other being Cirsium. Plants of the genus are known commonly as plumeless thistles. They are native to temperate Eurasia and North Africa, and several are known elsewhere as introduced species. This genus is noted for its disproportionately high number of noxious weeds compared to other flowering plant genera.

== Etymology ==
The genus name Carduus is from the Latin for "a kind of thistle" or "thistlelike plant". It is related to the word Cardonnacum ("a place of chardons or thistles"), which is the origin of Chardonnay, the name of the grape variety. It is also related to the word card, which as a noun means a device (often a stiff-bristled brush) for aligning and cleaning fibers, and as a verb means the action of processing fibers in that way.

== Description ==
These are usually annual or biennial herbs, sometimes perennial. Species often grow 2 meters in height but are known to reach 4 meters. The erect stems are winged and spiny, and usually have woolly hairs. The leaf blades are hairy to hairless and entire or divided into lobes, and they have spine-toothed edges. The flower heads are solitary or borne in inflorescences of up to 20. The head is spherical to cylindrical and covered in several layers of spreading or curving spine-tipped phyllaries. It contains long, tubular disc florets in shades of white, pink, or purple. The fruit is a cypsela tipped with a pappus of barbed bristles or scales.

== Ecology ==
Several Carduus are notorious invasive plants outside their native range, for example, in Australia and the United States. Species such as C. acanthoides, C. nutans, C. pycnocephalus, and C. tenuiflorus easily become weedy in disturbed habitat, such as overgrazed pasture. C. nutans is allelopathic, producing compounds that inhibit the growth and development of other plants.

Agents of biological pest control that have been used against weedy Carduus thistles include the thistle head weevil (Rhinocyllus conicus), thistle crown weevil (Trichosirocalus horridus), and thistle crown fly (Cheilosia corydon). The musk thistle rust (Puccinia carduorum), a fungus, may also be used against C. nutans.

== Species ==
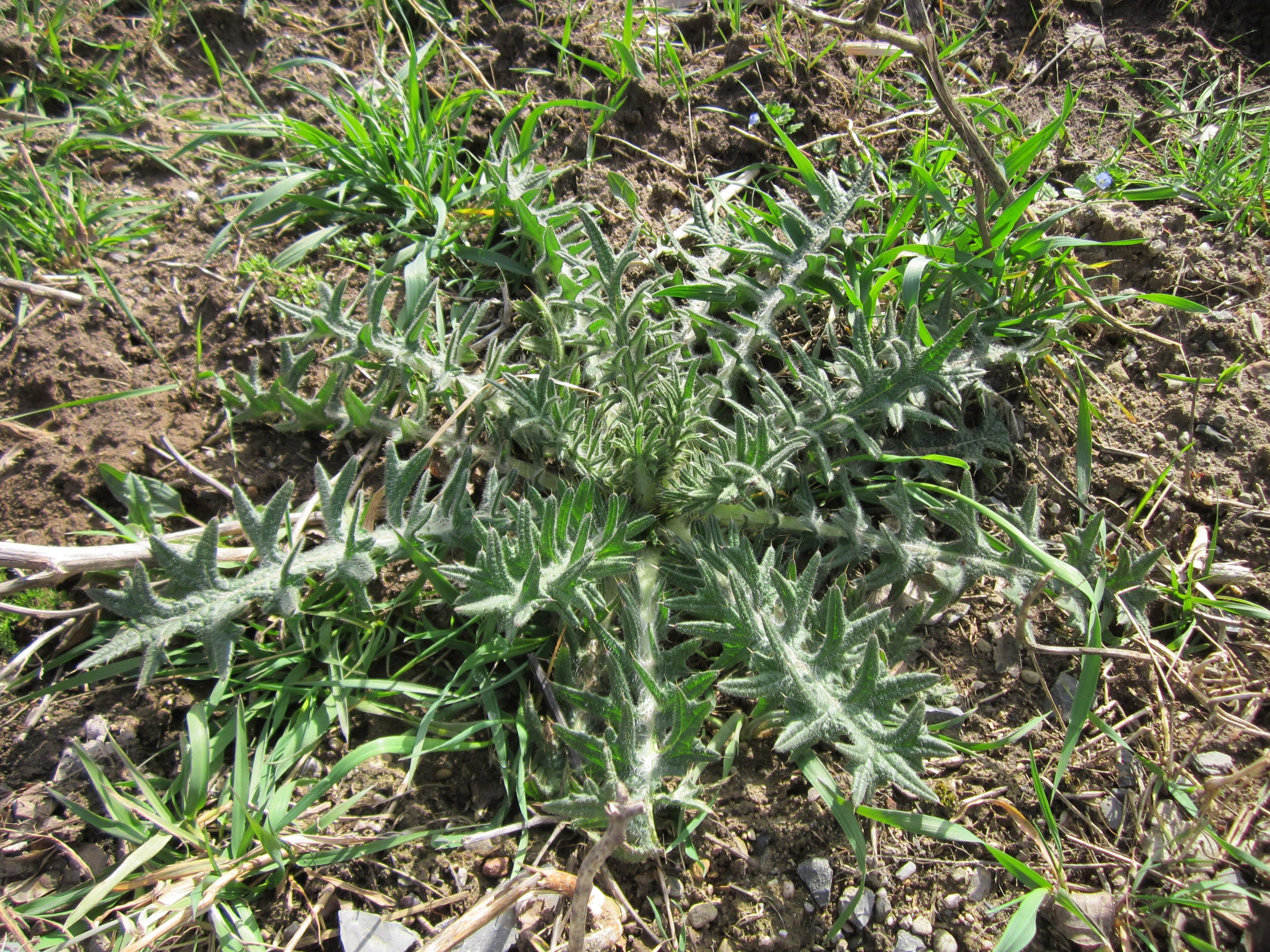
Carduus acanthoides

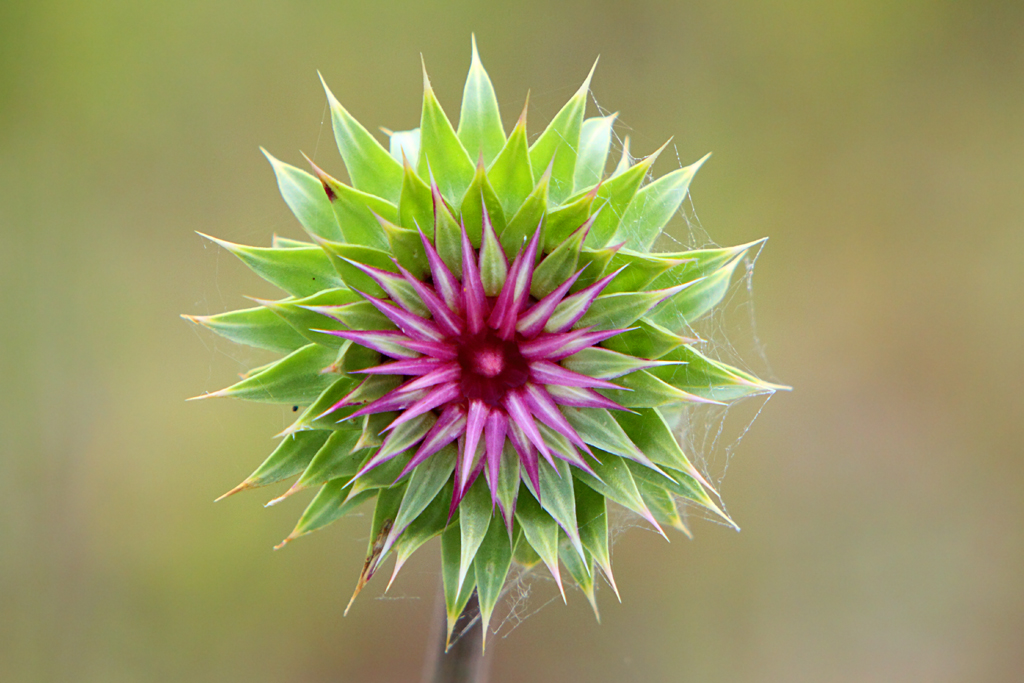
Carduus nutans

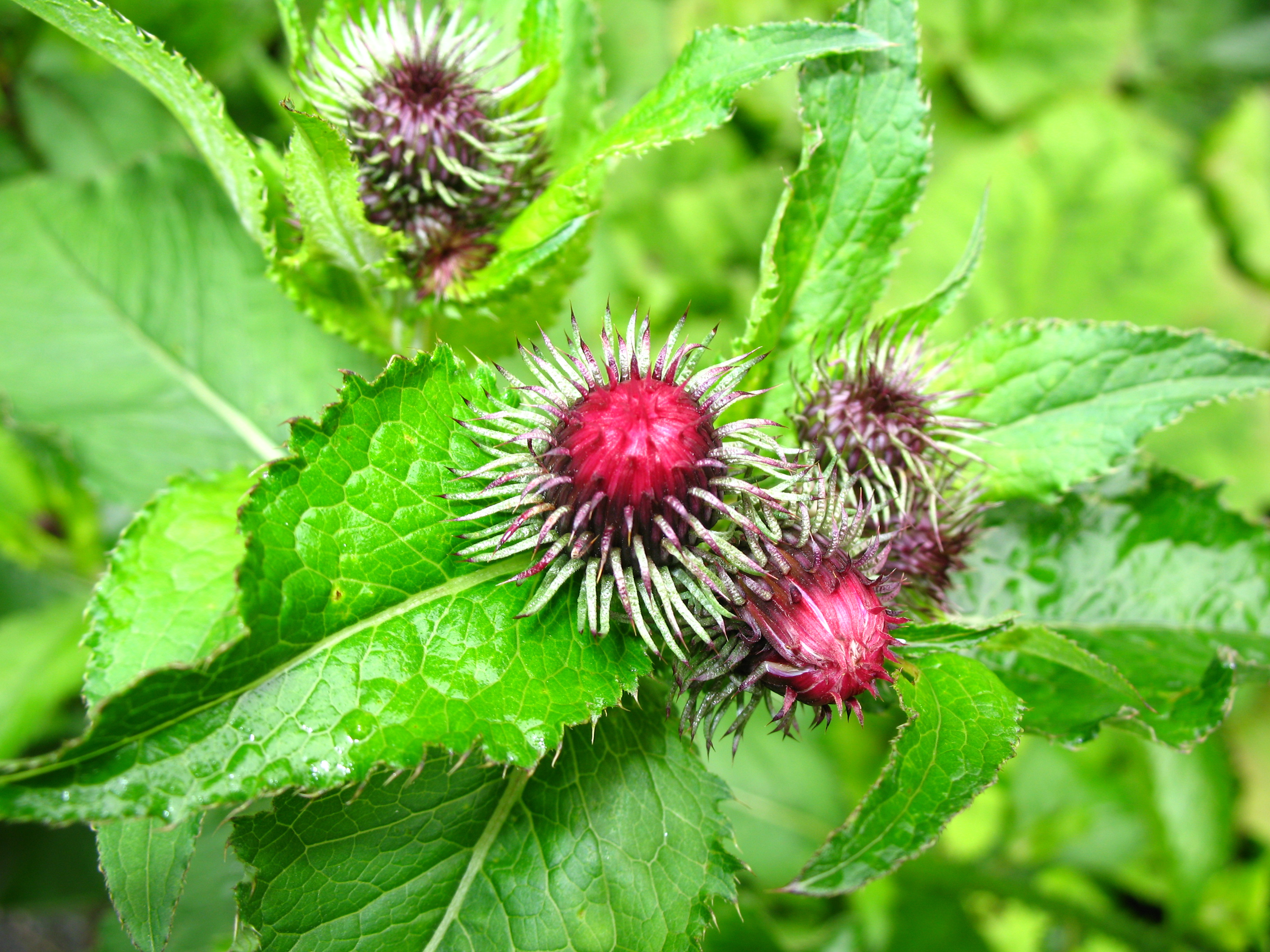
Carduus personata

The genus includes 82 accepted species, and several natural hybrids.

- Carduus acanthocephalus C.A.Mey.
- Carduus acanthoides L. – spiny plumeless thistle
- Carduus acicularis Bertol.
- Carduus adpressus C.A.Mey.
- Carduus affinis Guss.
- Carduus amanus Rech.f.
- Carduus angusticeps H.Lindb.
- Carduus × aragonensis Devesa & Talavera
- Carduus argentatus L.
- Carduus argyroa Biv.
- Carduus × arvaticus Font Quer & Rothm.
- Carduus asturicus Franco
- Carduus × atacinus (Arènes) B.Bock
- Carduus aurosicus Vill.
- Carduus axillaris Gaudin
- Carduus baeocephalus Webb
- Carduus ballii Hook.f.
- Carduus × bergadensis Sennen
- Carduus bourgaei Kazmi
- Carduus bourgeanus Boiss. & Reut.
- Carduus broteroi Welw. ex Cout.
- Carduus × brunneri Döll
- Carduus budaianus Jáv.
- Carduus × camplonensis Devesa & Talavera
- Carduus candicans Waldst. & Kit.
- Carduus × cantabricus Devesa & Talavera
- Carduus carduelis (L.) Gren.
- Carduus carlinoides Gouan
- Carduus carpetanus Boiss. & Reut.
- Carduus cephalanthus Viv.
- Carduus chevallieri Baratte ex Chevall.
- Carduus chrysacanthus Ten.
- Carduus clavulatus Link
- Carduus collinus Waldst. & Kit.
- Carduus corymbosus Ten.
- Carduus crispus L. – curly plumeless thistle, curled thistle, welted thistle
- Carduus dahuricus (Arènes) Kazmi
- Carduus defloratus L.
- Carduus edelbergii Rech.f.
- Carduus × estivali Arènes
- Carduus × fallax Borbás
- Carduus fasciculiflorus Viv.
- Carduus fissurae Nyár.
- Carduus getulus Pomel
- Carduus × gillotii Rouy
- Carduus × grassensis Briq. & Cavill.
- Carduus × grenieri Sch.Bip. ex Nyman
- Carduus hamulosus Ehrh.
- Carduus hazslinszkyanus Budai
- Carduus hohenackeri Kazmi
- Carduus ibicensis (Devesa & Talavera) Rosselló & N.Torres
- Carduus × intercedens Hausskn.
- Carduus × ipe Boros
- Carduus × jordanii Arènes
- Carduus kerneri Simonk.
- Carduus kirghisicus Sultanova
- Carduus kumaunensis (Arènes) Kazmi
- Carduus lanuginosus Willd.
- Carduus × leptocephalus Peterm.
- Carduus leptocladus Durieu
- Carduus litigiosus Nocca & Balb.
- Carduus lobulatus Borbás
- Carduus lusitanicus Rouy
- Carduus macrocephalus Desf.
- Carduus malyi Greuter
- Carduus maroccanus (Arènes) Kazmi
- Carduus martinezii Pau
- Carduus membranaceus Lojac.
- Carduus meonanthus Hoffmanns. & Link
- Carduus × meratii Arènes
- Carduus × mixtus Corb.
- Carduus modestii Tamamsch.
- Carduus × montis-majoris Teyber
- Carduus × moritzii Brügger
- Carduus myriacanthus Salzm. ex DC.
- Carduus nawaschini Bordz.
- Carduus nervosus K.Koch
- Carduus nigrescens Vill.
- Carduus numidicus Coss. & Durieu
- Carduus nutans L. – musk thistle, nodding thistle
- Carduus olympicus Boiss.
- Carduus onopordioides Fisch. ex M.Bieb.
- Carduus × orthocephalus Wallr.
- Carduus peisonis Teyber
- Carduus personata (L.) Jacq.
- Carduus poliochrus Trautv.
- Carduus × puechii H.J.Coste
- Carduus pumilus D.Don
- Carduus × pycnocephaloformis Arènes
- Carduus pycnocephalus – Italian thistle, Italian plumeless thistle, compact-headed thistle
  - Carduus pycnocephalus subsp. albidus (M.Bieb.) Kazmi
  - Carduus pycnocephalus subsp. arabicus (Jacq. ex Murray) Nyman (synonym Carduus arabicus Jacq. ex Murray) – Arabian thistle
  - Carduus pycnocephalus subsp. breviphyllarius P.H.Davis
  - Carduus pycnocephalus subsp. cinereus (M.Bieb.) P.H.Davis
  - Carduus pycnocephalus subsp. intermedius (Lojac.) Giardina & Raimondo
  - Carduus pycnocephalus subsp. pycnocephalus
- Carduus quercifolius F.K.Mey.
- Carduus ramosissimus Pančić
- Carduus rechingerianus Kazmi
- Carduus rivasgodayanus Devesa & Talavera
- Carduus santacreui (Devesa & Talavera) Devesa
- Carduus × schulzeanus Ruhmer
- Carduus seminudus M.Bieb.
- Carduus × sepincola Hausskn.
- Carduus × septentrionalis Devesa & Talavera
- Carduus solteszii Budai
- Carduus spachianus Durieu
- Carduus squarrosus DC. ex Lowe
- Carduus × stangii H.Buek
- Carduus tenuiflorus Curtis – sheep thistle, shore thistle, slender thistle
- Carduus × theriotii Rouy
- Carduus thracicus (Velen.) Hayek
- Carduus tmoleus Boiss.
- Carduus transcaspicus Gand.
- Carduus × turocensis Margittai
- Carduus uncinatus M.Bieb.
- Carduus × veronensis Arènes
- Carduus × vigoi Mateo
- Carduus volutarioides Reyes-Bet.
- Carduus × weizensis Hayek

=== Formerly placed here ===
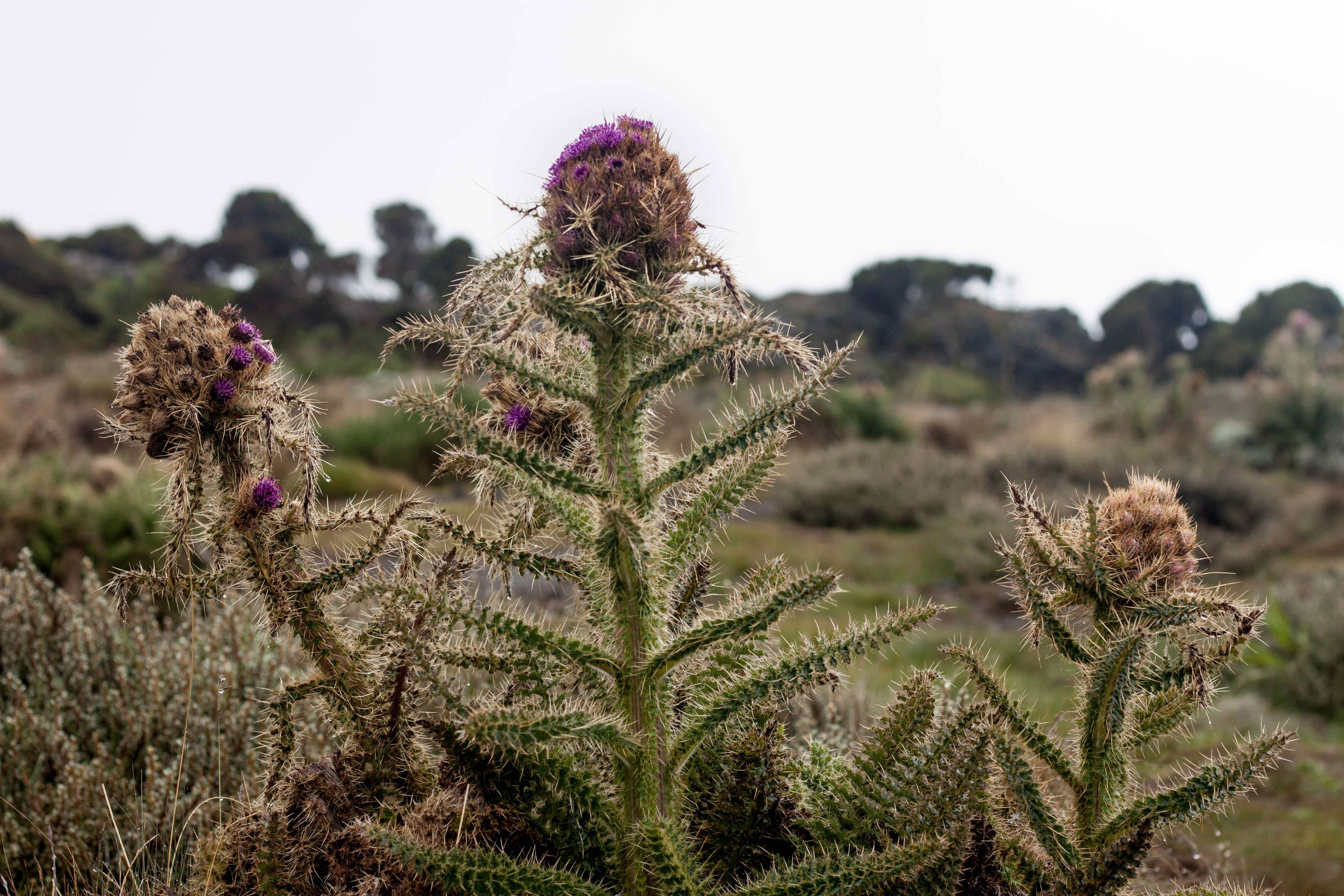
Afrocarduus keniensis

- Afrocarduus afromontanus (R.E.Fr.) N.Garcia, Moreyra & Susanna (as Carduus afromontanus R.E.Fr.)
- Afrocarduus keniensis (R.E.Fr.) N.Garcia, Moreyra & Susanna (as Carduus keniensis R.E.Fr.)
- Carduus keniensis × C. platyphyllus
- Afrocarduus kikuyorum (R.E.Fr.) N.Garcia, Moreyra & Susanna (as Carduus kikuyorum R.E.Fr.)
- Afrocarduus leptacanthus (Fresen.) N.Garcia, Moreyra & Susanna (as Carduus leptacanthus Fresen.)
- Afrocarduus macracanthus (Kazmi) N.Garcia, Moreyra & Susanna (as Carduus macracanthus Kazmi)
- Afrocarduus millefolius (R.E.Fr.) N.Garcia, Moreyra & Susanna (as Carduus millefolius R.E.Fr.)
- Afrocarduus nyassanus (S.Moore) N.Garcia, Moreyra & Susanna (as Carduus nyassanus (S.Moore) R.E.Fr.)
- Afrocarduus ruwenzoriensis (S.Moore) N.Garcia, Moreyra & Susanna (as Carduus ruwenzoriensis S.Moore)
- Afrocarduus schimperi (Sch.Bip.) N.Garcia, Moreyra & Susanna (as Carduus schimperi Sch.Bip.)
- Afrocarduus silvarum (R.E.Fr.) N.Garcia, Moreyra & Susanna (as Carduus silvarum R.E.Fr.)
