= Introduced species of the British Isles =

Ecological issue

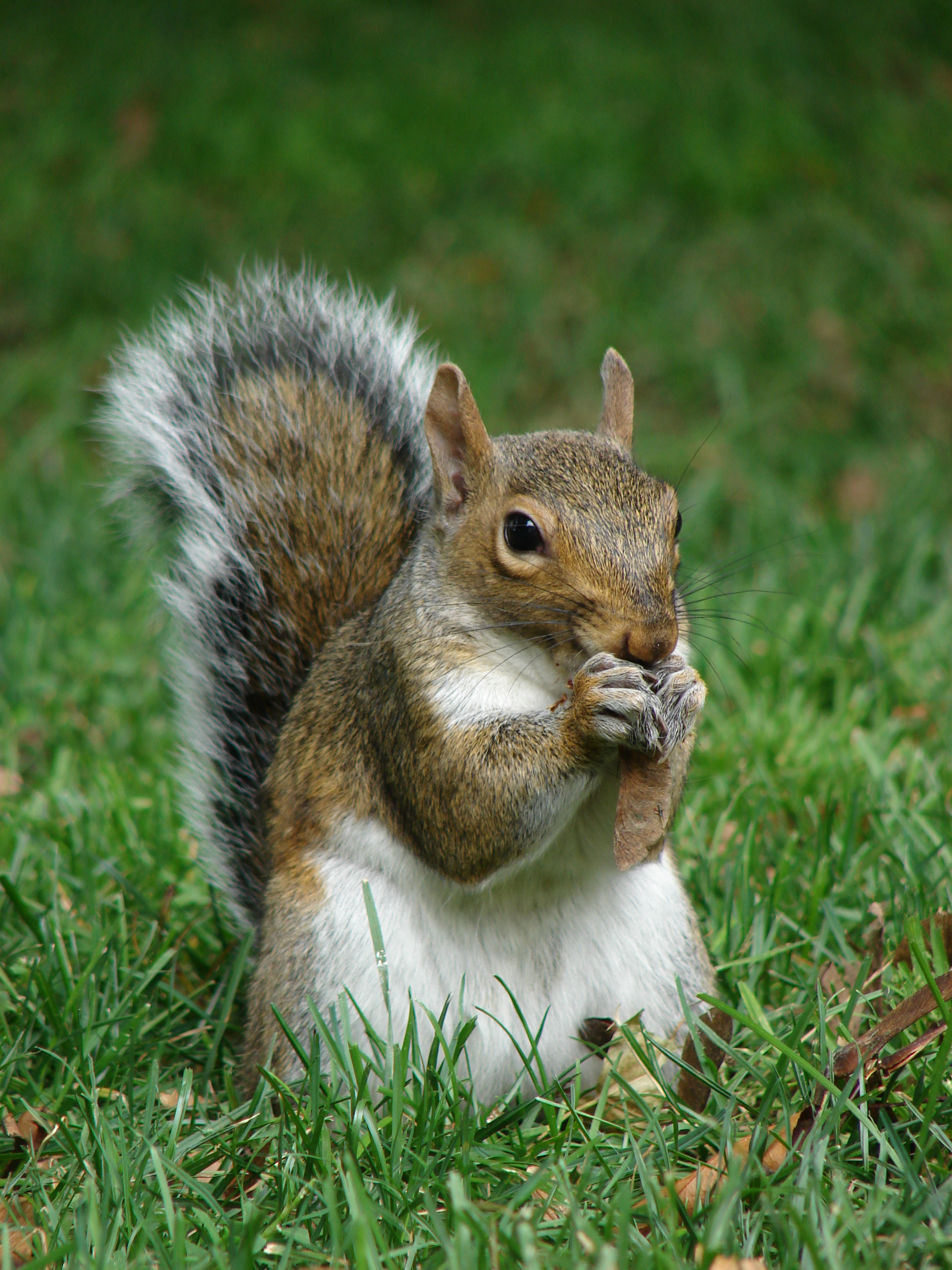
The grey squirrel is an introduced species in Great Britain, where it threatens the country's native red squirrel population.

Islands, such as the British Isles, can be adversely affected by the introduction of non-native species. Often an island will have several distinct species not present on the nearest mainland, and vice versa. The native flora and fauna of islands which have been isolated for a longer period of time such as New Zealand or Hawaii (which have been isolated for millions of years) are more vulnerable than islands such as Great Britain and Ireland, which became isolated more recently (8,000 years ago at the end of the Last Glacial Period).

Many species have been introduced to Britain during historical times. Some species such as the midwife toad (Alytes), rainbow trout (Oncorhynchus mykiss), sweet chestnut (Castanea sativa) and horseradish (Armoracia rusticana) have been introduced with few adverse consequences. However, others such as the grey squirrel (Sciurus carolinensis), signal crayfish (Pacifastacus leniusculus), and Japanese knotweed (Fallopia japonica) have had a severe impact both economically and ecologically.

== Problems caused ==
=== Economics ===
In 2010 CABI (Centre for Agricultural Bioscience International) estimated that introduced species in United Kingdom cost £2 billion annually. The most costly species were listed as being the European rabbit and Japanese knotweed. The European rabbit, introduced to Britain by the Romans in 1AD, eats and therefore damages a wide variety of crops and cost the UK £263 million. Japanese knotweed, introduced as an ornamental garden plant in the late 19th century, the roots of which spread by underground rhizomes, can undermine and damage buildings, pavements and roads, cost £179 million. In fact, most mortgage lenders in the UK will demand proof of the plant's eradication from a home owner's property (if signs of it being present are noticed), for it can cause potential physical damage to one's estate. In 2023, it was confirmed that the number of non-native plant species introduced to the UK outnumbered the number of native UK plant species

=== Ecology ===
==== Displacement of native species ====
In addition to the economic costs incurred by management, some introduced fauna displace native species. This can occur by predation, competition for resources, or the spread of disease.

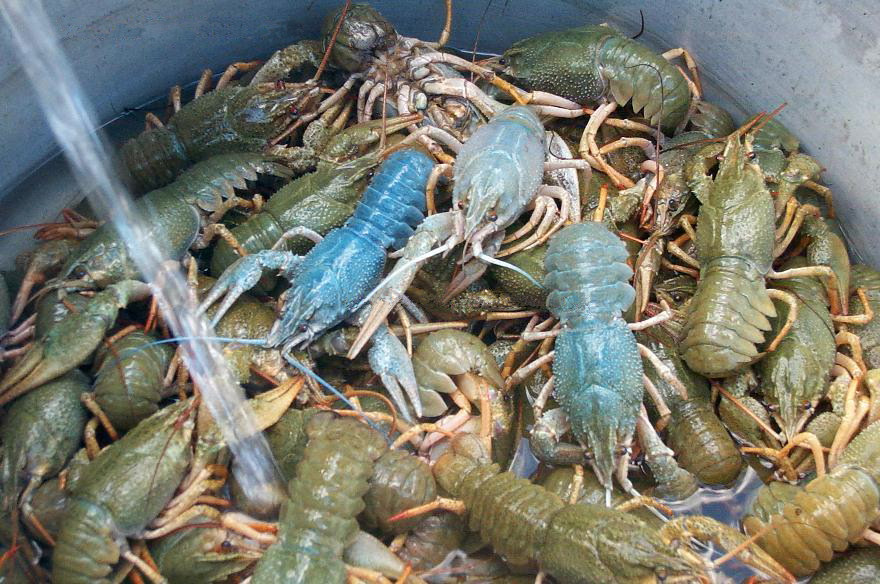
The native European crayfish

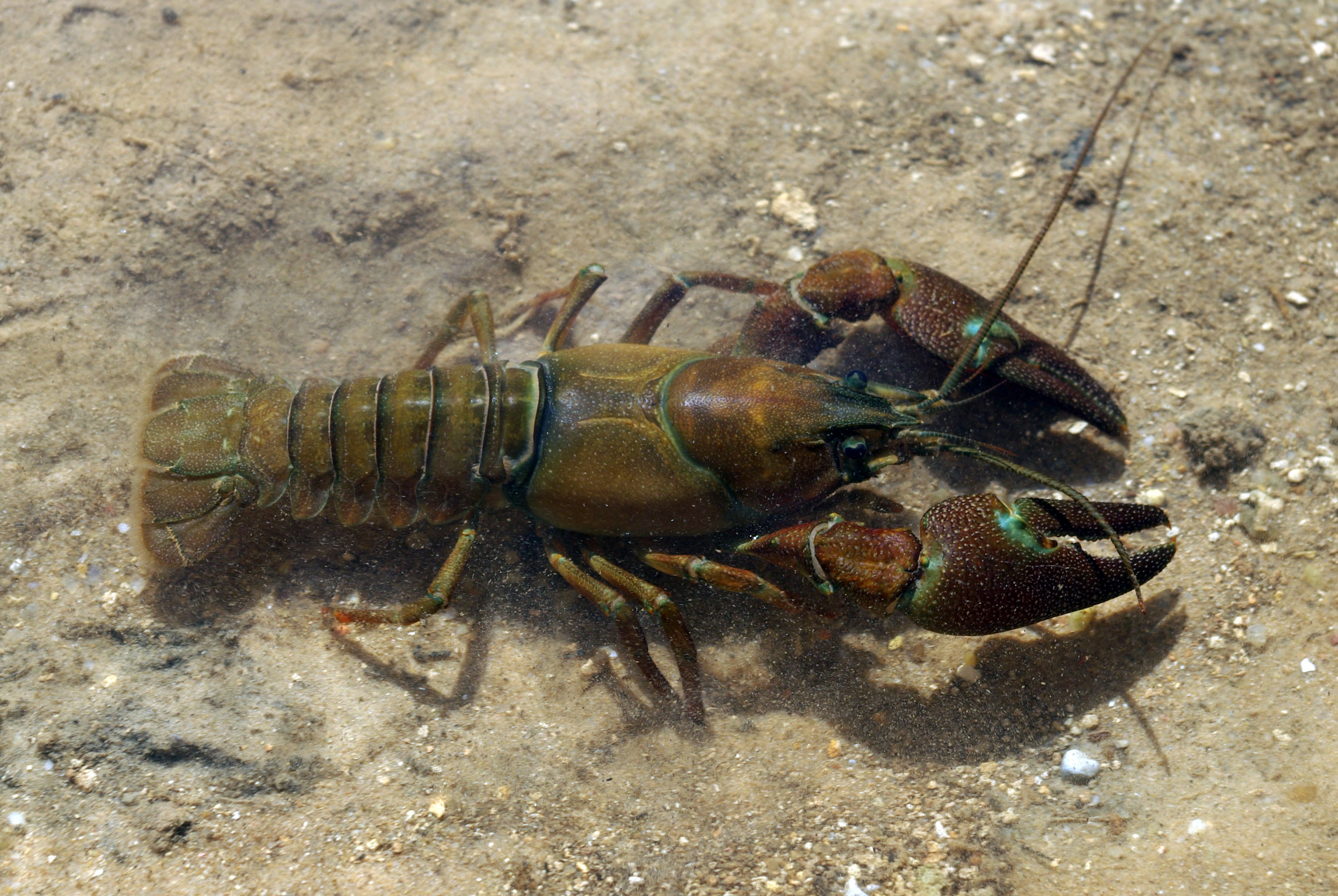
The introduced signal crayfish

Predation: American mink (Neogale vison), which either escaped or were released from fur farms, prey on native European water voles (Arvicola amphibius) and are drastically reducing their numbers. It was reported that since the late 1980s, 90% of the UK population of the European water vole has been lost, primarily due to displacement and predation by the American mink.

Resource competition: The introduced grey squirrel is larger and more aggressive than the native red squirrel (Sciurus vulgaris) and displaces the native squirrel by competing for food and habitat. Rose-ringed parakeet (Psittacula krameri) populations, originally an Afro-Asian parakeet, have become established in Britain from introduced and escaped birds. There are two main populations: the largest is based around south London, where they can be regularly seen in places such as Battersea Park, Richmond Park, and Greenwich Park; the smaller population can be seen in Surrey and Berkshire, and by 2005 consisted of many thousands of birds, known as the Kingston parakeets. These large parakeets displace native birds species by competing for roosts and nest sites.

Disease: Some introduced species carry diseases to which native species are susceptible. The grey squirrel is a carrier of the squirrel pox virus which kills red squirrels but not grey squirrels. The European crayfish is susceptible to crayfish plague which is spread by the introduced signal crayfish.

Unlike some other environmental problems such as pollution, the effect of an introduced species is not a single event. Once a species has been introduced to an island, the problems may persist and escalate as the species spreads further.

==== Environmental damage ====
Coypus (Myocastor coypus), large semi-aquatic rodents native to South America, were introduced to the British Isles in 1929 when fur farms were set up in Sussex, Hampshire, Devon and Norfolk. The farms were sited mainly in lowland areas rich in rivers and streams. During the 1930s coypus escaped from captivity and despite repeated attempts to control them, they adapted well to the British habitat, breeding successfully in the countryside of East Anglia. Their habit of building large burrows in river banks caused great erosion damage and threatened the tourism industry where boating is a popular recreation, and caused great damage to drainage works. Coypu were declared to have been successfully eradicated in December 1989 but in 2012 a "giant rat" was killed in County Durham, and authorities suspected that the animal was, in fact, a coypu.

== Management of introduced species ==
Some species have adapted harmoniously into the ecology of the British Isles. For example, the little owl is not native to the British Isles but was first introduced in 1842, by Thomas Powys and is now naturalised there. However, the presence of some introduced species has proved disastrous for native flora and fauna. There is often a link between how well a species can integrate with an existing ecosystem, and the distance from their local range; i.e. species sourced closer to the sink site tend to cause less damage.

Case studies of impact examples can be found at the Non-native Species Secretariat website.

Information on control methods for aquatic species can be found at the GB Non-native Species Secretariat website.

=== Example: grey squirrel ===
One notable example of a species introduced to the British Isles is the grey squirrel from North America, which out-competes the smaller native red squirrel, as well as carrying a virus that is fatal to the reds. The cost of attempting eradication was reported in 2010 to be £14 million. These attempts have been deemed unsuccessful and priority is now being given to preserving the remaining red squirrel habitats.

The following is a partial list of introduced species. Species marked with a dagger (†) are controlled by The Invasive Alien Species (Enforcement and Permitting) Order 2019, which is the latest legislation.

== Vertebrates ==
=== Mammals ===
- American mink
- Black rat
- Brown rat
- Chinese water deer
- Coypu or Nutria from South America (subsequently eradicated)
- Grey squirrel† from North America
- Edible dormouse from Europe
- European rabbit from Continental Europe
- Fallow deer from Continental Europe
- Feral cat from the Middle East
- Feral goat
- House mouse
- Red-necked wallaby from Australia
- Reeves's muntjac† deer from China
- Sika deer from Asia

=== Birds ===
- Canada goose
- Common pheasant
- Egyptian goose† from Africa
- Golden pheasant from Asia
- Indian Peafowl
- Lady Amherst's pheasant
- Little owl from mainland Europe
- Mandarin duck from Asia
- Red-legged partridge
- Rose-ringed parakeet from Asia, see Feral parakeets in Great Britain
- Ruddy duck† from America
- Silver pheasant

=== Reptiles ===
- Aesculapian snake
- Common wall lizard
- European pond terrapin
- 22 species of terrapin especially slider†
- Western green lizard

=== Amphibians ===
- Alpine newt
- American bullfrog (not established)
- Edible frog
- European tree frog
- Marsh frog
- Midwife toad
- Pool frog (southern clade alien; northern clade reintroduced)
- Yellow-bellied toad

=== Fish ===
- Bitterling
- Black bullhead (subsequently eradicated)
- Bluegill
- Brook trout
- Common carp
- Fathead minnow (subsequently eradicated)
- Goldfish
- Grass carp
- Orfe
- Pacific humped back salmon
- Pumpkinseed
- Rainbow trout
- Sunbleak
- Topmouth gudgeon
- Walleye (subsequently lost)
- Wels
- Zander

== Invertebrates ==
=== Molluscs ===
- Asian gold clam (Corbicula fluminea)
- "Durham" slug (Arion flagellus)
- New Zealand mud snail (Potamopyrgus antipodarum)
- Spanish slug (Arion vulgaris)
- Zebra mussel (Dreissena polymorpha), invasive

=== Crustaceans ===
- Chinese mitten crab†
- Killer shrimp
- Red swamp crayfish†
- Signal crayfish†
- Spiny-cheek crayfish†

=== Insects ===
==== Ants ====
- Pharaoh ant from the United States
- List of non-endemic ant species introduced to Great Britain

==== Beetles ====
- Asian long-horned beetle (Anoplophora glabripennis) subsequently eradicated.
- Chrysolina americana
- Citrus long-horned beetle (Anoplophora chinensis) invasive
- Colorado potato beetle (Leptinotarsa decemlineata) not established, eradicated at least 163 times.
- Harlequin ladybird

==== Butterflies and moths ====
- Adoxophyes orana summer fruit tortrix moth
- Argyresthia cupressella moth from United States
- Argyresthia cupressella moth from United States
- Blastobasis adustella moth
- Blastobasis lacticolella moth
- Box tree moth (Cydalima perspectalis) from east Asia
- Brown house moth from Asia
- Carnation tortrix
- Codling moth
- Coleotechnites piceaella moth from United States
- Common forest looper (Pseudocoremia suavis) a New Zealand endemic found west Cornwall in 2007, possibly not established.
- Cotoneaster webworm moth from United States
- Geranium bronze butterfly from South Africa via Southern Europe on geranium (not established)
- Horse-chestnut leaf miner
- Large chequered skipper butterfly from continental Europe to Channel Islands (subsequently lost)
- Large copper butterfly (Lycaena dispar batavus) from The Netherlands (subsequently lost)
- Large copper butterfly (Lycaena dispar rutilus) from Continental Europe (subsequently lost)
- Light brown apple moth (Epiphyas postvittana) from Australia
- Map butterfly (subsequently eradicated)
- Musotima nitidalis, from Australia and New Zealand and first found in Dorset in 2009. It has since spread across southern England to Essex and is thought to have been originally imported with tree ferns.
- Oak processionary moth (Thaumetopoea processionea)
- Psychoides filicivora moth from the Far East
- Simacauda dicommatias, a South American moth found in Cornwall in 2020, but probably here since the introduction of the larval food plant Chilean myrtle (Luma apiculata) over a hundred years ago.
- Tachystola acroxantha moth from Australia

==== Planarians ====
Two species that prey on earthworms:

- Arthurdendyus triangulatus - from New Zealand
- Australoplana sanguinea - from Australia

==== Stick insects ====
- Prickly stick insect (Acanthoxyla prasina) from New Zealand
- Unarmed stick insect (Acanthoxyla inermis) from New Zealand

==== Termites ====
- Reticulitermes grassei - identified in 1994 in Saunton, Devon. Declared eradicated in 2021

=== Arachnids ===
- Euscorpius flavicaudis (European yellow-tailed scorpion) invasive; probably originating from Italy; there is a thriving colony in Kent
- Redback spider from Australia - recorded but without evidence of a breeding population
- Steatoda nobilis (noble false widow) - thought to originate from Madeira and the Canary Islands.
- Wasp spider from northern Europe

== Plants ==
- American skunk-cabbage
- American willow herb
- Autumnal crocus
- Bermuda buttercup
- Canadian pond weed
- Common field speedwell
- Cotoneaster
- Curly waterweed†
- Epilobium brunnescens
- Evening primrose
- Fanwort†
- Floating pennywort†
- Floating water primrose†
- Fox and cubs
- Giant hogweed†
- Giant rhubarb†
- Guernsey fleabane
- Himalayan balsam†
- Hottentot fig
- Japanese knotweed
- Jewelweed
- Least duckweed
- Leycesteria formosa
- Nuttall's waterweed†
- Oxford ragwort
- Parrot's feather†
- Pigmy weed
- Piri-piri burr
- Purple dewplant
- Purple pitcher
- Rhododendron
- Russian vine
- Spanish bluebell
- Water fern
- Water hyacinth†
- Water primrose†
- White butterbur
- Myriophyllum verticillatum, whorled water milfoil, invasive to Ireland

== See also ==
- List of invasive non-native species in England and Wales
- List of introduced species
- Lists of invasive species
- Invasive species in Australia
- Invasive species in New Zealand

== Resources ==
- GB Non-native Species Secretariat
- Scottish Invasive Species Initiative
