= List of invasive non-native species in England and Wales =

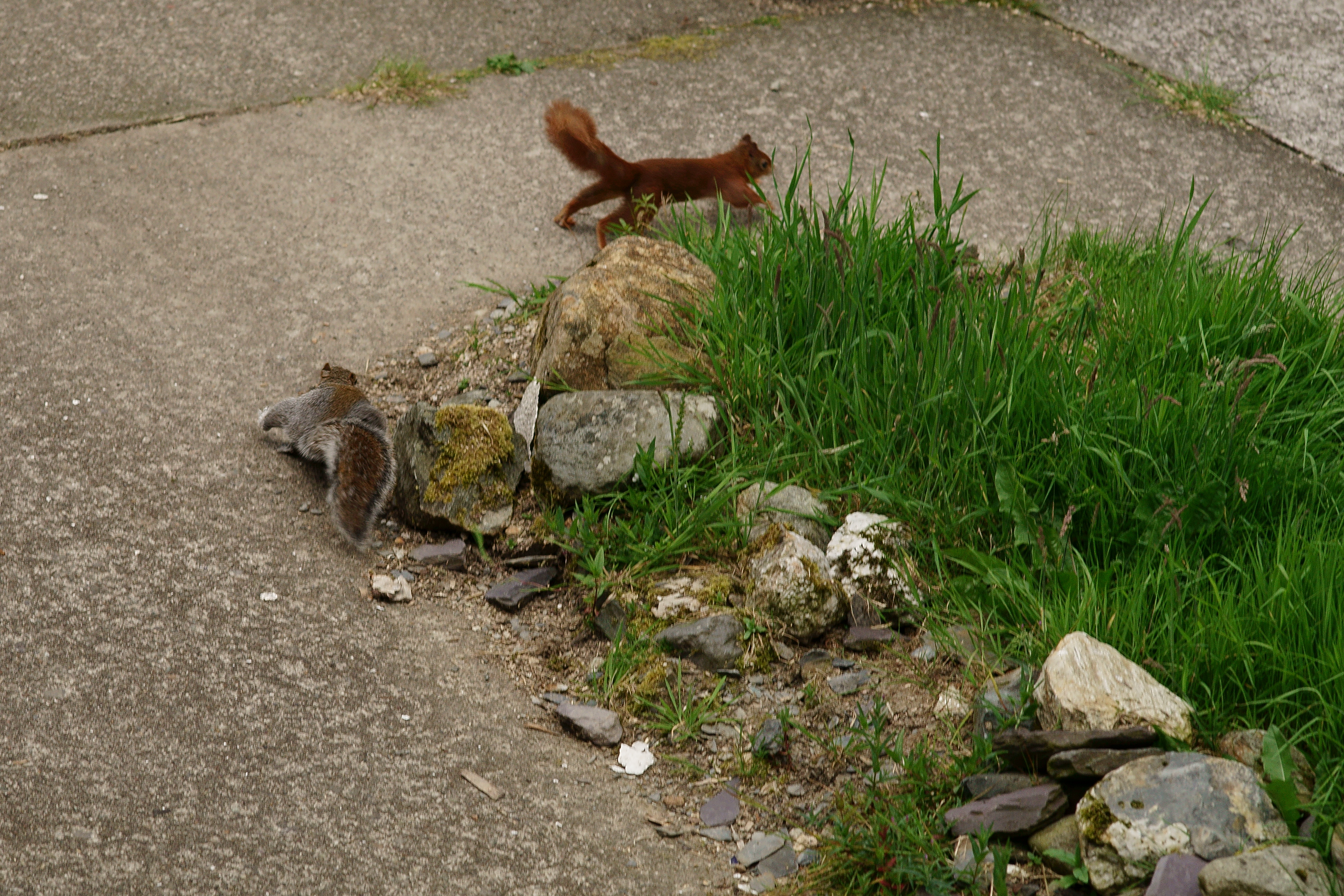
A non-native grey squirrel chases a native red squirrel in Betws Garmon, Wales.

There are regulations that aim to prevent and minimise the impact of the introduction and spread of invasive species that are not native to England and Wales.

The Invasive Alien Species (Enforcement and Permitting) Order 2019 gives effect to EU regulations on the prevention and management of the spread of invasive alien species; they list 66 species which are of special concern, of which 14 are found in England and Wales.

== Widely spread ==
The 14 species that have been identified as being widely spread in both England and Wales, and thus requiring management, are:

=== Animals ===
Common name	Scientific name	When it was listed	Image
Chinese mitten crab	Eriocheir sinensis	3 August 2016	
Egyptian goose	Alopochen aegyptiacus	2 August 2017	
Grey squirrel	Sciurus carolinensis	3 August 2016	
Muntjac deer	Muntiacus reevesi	3 August 2016	
Signal crayfish	Pacifastacus leniusculus	3 August 2016	
Pond slider (all subspecies)	Trachemys scripta	3 August 2016	

=== Plants ===
Common name	Scientific name	Listing	Image
American skunk cabbage	Lysichiton americanus	3 August 2016	
Chilean rhubarb	Gunnera tinctoria	2 August 2017	
Curly waterweed	Lagarosiphon major	3 August 2016	
Floating pennywort	Hydrocotyle ranunculoides	3 August 2016	
Giant hogweed	Heracleum mantegazzianum	2 August 2017	
Himalayan balsam	Impatiens glandulifera	2 August 2017	
Nuttall’s waterweed	Elodea nuttallii	2 August 2017	
Parrot’s feather	Myriophyllum aquaticum	3 August 2016	

== Non-widely spread ==
=== Animals ===
Common name	Scientific name	When it was listed
Asian hornet	Vespa velutina nigrithorax	3 August 2016
Chinese sleeper/Amur sleeper	Percottus glenii	3 August 2016
Coati	Nasua nasua	3 August 2016
Common myna	Acridotheres tristis	15 August 2019
Coypu	Myocastor coypus	3 August 2016
Fox squirrel	Sciurus niger	3 August 2016
Indian house crow	Corvus splendens	3 August 2016
Marbled crayfish	Procambarus fallax f. virginalis (Procambarus virginalis)	3 August 2016
Muskrat	Ondatra zibethicus	2 August 2017
New Zealand flatworm	Arthurdendyus triangulatus	15 August 2019
North American bullfrog	Lithobates (Rana) catesbeianus	3 August 2016
Pallas’s squirrel	Callosciurus erythraeus	3 August 2016
Pumpkinseed	Lepomis gibbosus	15 August 2019
Raccoon	Procyon lotor	3 August 2016
Raccoon dog	Nyctereutes procyonoides	2 February 2019
Red swamp crayfish	Procambarus clarkii	3 August 2016
Ruddy duck	Oxyura jamaicensis	3 August 2016
Sacred ibis	Threskiornis aethiopicus	3 August 2016
Siberian chipmunk	Tamias sibiricus	3 August 2016
Small Asian mongoose / Javan mongoose	Herpestes javanicus	3 August 2016
Spiny-cheek crayfish	Orconectes limosus (Faxonius limosus)	3 August 2016
Striped eel catfish	Plotosus lineatus	15 August 2019
Topmouth gudgeon (stone moroko)	Pseudorasbora parva	3 August 2016
Virile crayfish	Orconectes virilis (Faxonius virilis)	3 August 2016

=== Plants ===
Common name	Scientific name	Listing
Alligator weed	Alternanthera philoxeroides	2 August 2017
Asiatic tearthumb	Persicaria perfoliata	3 August 2016
Balloon vine	Cardiospermum grandiflorum	15 August 2019
Broadleaf watermilfoil	Myriophyllum heterophyllum	2 August 2017
Broomsedge bluestem	Andropogon virginicus	15 August 2019
Chinese bushclover	Lespedeza cuneata	15 August 2019
Chinese tallow	Triadica sebifera	15 August 2019
Common milkweed	Asclepias syriaca	2 August 2017
Crimson fountaingrass	Pennisetum setaceum	2 August 2017
Eastern baccharis	Baccharis halimifolia	3 August 2016
Fanwort	Cabomba caroliniana	3 August 2016
Floating primrose-willow	Ludwigia peploides	3 August 2016
Golden wreath wattle	Acacia saligna	15 August 2019
Japanese hop	Humulus scandens	15 August 2019
Japanese stiltgrass	Microstegium vimineum	2 August 2017
Kudzu vine	Pueraria lobata	3 August 2016
Mesquite	Prosopis juliflora	15 August 2019
Perennial veldt grass	Ehrharta calycina	15 August 2019
Persian hogweed	Heracleum persicum	3 August 2016
Purple pampas grass	Cortaderia jubata	15 August 2019
Salvinia moss	Salvinia molesta	15 August 2019
Senegal tea plant	Gymnocoronis spilanthoides	15 August 2019
Sosnowsky’s hogweed	Heracleum sosnowskyi	3 August 2016
Tree of Heaven	Ailanthus altissima	15 August 2019
Vine-like fern	Lygodium japonicum	15 August 2019
Water hyacinth	Eichhornia crassipes	3 August 2016
Water-primrose	Ludwigia grandiflora	3 August 2016
Whitetop weed	Parthenium hysterophorus	3 August 2016

== See also ==
Introduced species of the British Isles
