= Elodea schweinitzii =

Conservation status
- Possibly Extinct (NatureServe)

Scientific classification
- Kingdom: Plantae
- Clade: Tracheophytes
- Clade: Angiosperms
- Clade: Monocots
- Order: Alismatales
- Family: Hydrocharitaceae
- Genus: Elodea
- Species: E. schweinitzii

Binomial name
- Elodea schweinitzii (Planch.) Casp.

Synonyms
- Apalanthe schweinitzii Planch. 1848

Species of flowering plant

Elodea schweinitzii, commonly known as Schweinitz's waterweed, is a possibly extinct species of aquatic plant endemic to New Jersey, New York, and Pennsylvania. The holotype was collected by Lewis David de Schweinitz, but was given no locality data. Schweinitz, however, collected other specimens from Bethlehem, Pennsylvania, some or all of which were likely isotypes. Elodea schweinitzii has not been recorded from Pennsylvania since Schweinitz's last collection made in 1832.

== Description ==
Elodea schweinitzii was characterized from similar species by the presence of perfect flowers. Each flower possessed three stamens and three to four stigmas, which were sometimes bifid. Elodea schweinitzii was unusually variable in its floral morphology. This species was possibly of hybrid origin, though not simply F1 cross. Some sources consider it too variable to justify recognition, and is sometimes considered a perfect flowered form of Elodea canadensis. Its flowers possessed two white petals and its fruit was a berrylike capsule. The stems were usually submerged in water while the flowers were projected to the surface of the water.

Elodea schweinitzii was threatened by water pollution and development. Elodea schweinitzii inhabited rivers in New York, Northern New Jersey and Eastern Pennsylvania.
