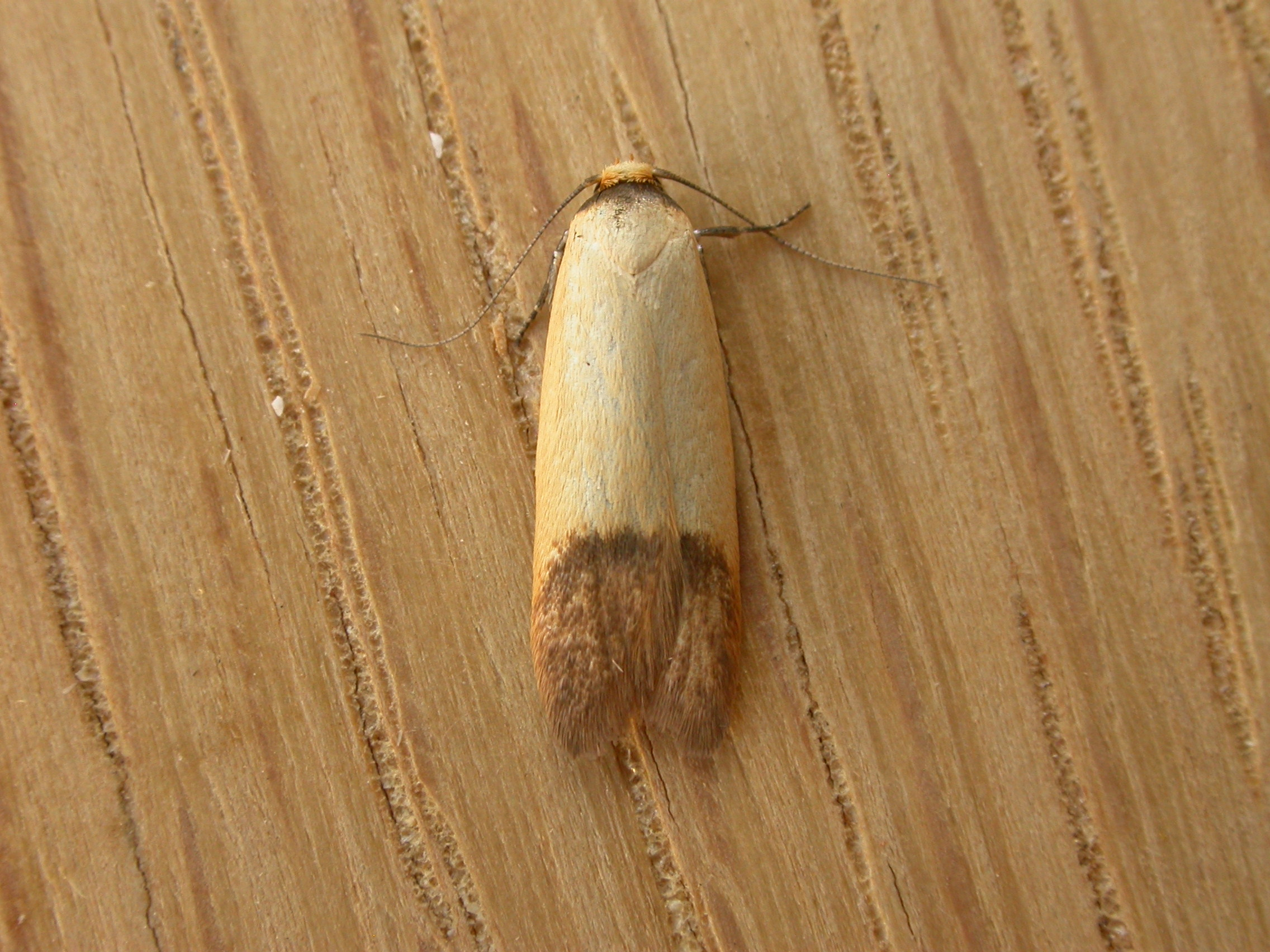

Scientific classification
- Kingdom: Animalia
- Phylum: Arthropoda
- Class: Insecta
- Order: Lepidoptera
- Family: Oecophoridae
- Genus: Tachystola
- Species: T. stenoptera

Binomial name
- Tachystola stenoptera (Meyrick, 1884)

Synonyms
- Coesyra stenoptera Meyrick, 1884

= Tachystola stenoptera =

Species of moth

Tachystola stenoptera is a moth of the family Oecophoridae. It is found in the Australian Capital Territory, New South Wales, Queensland, South Australia, Tasmania, Victoria and Western Australia.
