= Aristotelia ivae =

Scientific classification
- Kingdom: Animalia
- Phylum: Arthropoda
- Clade: Pancrustacea
- Class: Insecta
- Order: Lepidoptera
- Family: Gelechiidae
- Genus: Aristotelia
- Species: A. ivae

Binomial name
- Aristotelia ivae Busck, 1900

Species of insect

Aristotelia ivae is a moth of the family Gelechiidae. It was described by August Busck in 1900. It is found in North America, where it has been recorded from Florida and Georgia.

The wingspan is 11.2-11.8 mm. The forewings are light silvery drab, on the outer half freely dusted with white and black scales. From the costa, there are two dark brown, nearly black, bands reaching the fold. The first from the base of the costa oblique outward, narrowing to a point. The other from the basal third curves outward and upward to a point after having reached the fold. These spots are narrowly margined with silvery yellow. A third indistinct, triangular, costal, light-brown spot has this margination wider and is followed by a small whitish spot. The tip of the wing is black. The hindwings are dark gray.

The larvae feed on Iva frutescens. The larvae have a dark purple body with eight wavy interrupted longitudinal lines and a yellow head. They reach a length of about 12 mm.

It was also introduced into Australia from Florida, USA, in 1969 to control the introduced weed Baccharis halimifolia (Asteraceae).
