= Lake Carrot =

Lake in Northland Region, New Zealand

Coordinates: 35°01′20″S 173°11′15″E

Lake Carrot is a lake in the Northland Region of New Zealand, near Kaitaia.

Lake Carrot has no surface water outflows or inflows, and is part of the Sweetwater dune lake system. While containing charophyte algae, the lake also contains the invasive Egeria densa which reduces water quality. The Northland Regional Council has recorded lake temperatures over the last decade, which range from 14 °C to 24 °C.

== See also ==
- List of lakes in New Zealand
