= Elodea bifoliata =

Conservation status
- Apparently Secure (NatureServe)

Scientific classification
- Kingdom: Plantae
- Clade: Tracheophytes
- Clade: Angiosperms
- Clade: Monocots
- Order: Alismatales
- Family: Hydrocharitaceae
- Genus: Elodea
- Species: E. bifoliata

Binomial name
- Elodea bifoliata H.St.John, 1962

Synonyms
- Elodea longivaginata H.St.John (1962); Elodea nevadensis H.St.John (1962)

North American aquatic plant species

Elodea bifoliata, commonly called twoleaf waterweed, is a species of perennial flowering plant in the waterweed genus, Elodea. It grows in much of the western United States and Canada. It was only recognized as a separate species in the 1960s. It is found growing in streams and shallow bodies of water.

== Description ==
Elodea bifoliata is a perennial aquatic plant that roots in the bottoms of freshwater streams and lakes. It has small flat leaves just 4.7–24.8 millimeters long. They are narrow and grass like or only slightly elliptic, 0.8–2.5 mm in width. There are usually just two leaves at each stem node, though there may be two or three per node at the middle of the stem. They are never crowded near the tip.

Plants have separate seed producing and pollen producing inflorescences. A pollen producing, staminate inflorescence will have leaf like bracts 10 to 42 millimeters long. They are narrow at the base and 2–5 mm wide further out. The staminate bracts are cylindrical, rather than flat like the leaves. The pollen producing flowers are small, with sepals just 3.5–5 mm long and petals just 4.5–5 mm long, and are shed soon after opening. Each flower will have seven to nine stamens. The seed producing, pistillate flowers are smaller with 1.4–2.8 mm sepals and 1.8–4 mm petals.

The seeds are deformed spheres densely covered in long hairs, 2.8–3 millimeters in size.

== Taxonomy ==
Elodea bifoliata was only scientifically described by Harold St. John in 1962. It has no subspecies, but two species described at the same time by St. John, Elodea longivaginata and Elodea nevadensis, are considered to be synonyms. His description was based upon plants that he collected from one of the Lake Mary reservoirs near Flagstaff in Coconino County, Arizona.

Elodea bifoliata is placed in genus Elodea in Hydrocharitaceae, a family of aquatic plants.

=== Names ===
It is known by the common name twoleaf waterweed in English.

== Range and habitat ==
Elodea bifoliata has a native range that extends over much of the western United States and Canada. It is found in all the Rocky Mountain States including Montana, Idaho, Wyoming, Colorado, and New Mexico. To the east its range extends into five northern Great Plains states, Kansas, Nebraska, both Dakotas, and Minnesota. In the southwest the range includes Arizona, Utah, and Nevada. Though the USDA does not record it there, the Jepson Herbarium reports that it grows in the farthest north eastern corner of California. It also has been found in Oregon, but not in Washington State. The USDA also reports it from the eastern state of New York.

In Canada it grows in four western provinces, Alberta, British Columbia, Manitoba, and Saskatchewan according to Plants of the World Online.

This species is only found growing in water such as streams and the shallow portions of lakes and reservoirs.
