= Tachystola mulliganae =

Scientific classification
- Domain: Eukaryota
- Kingdom: Animalia
- Phylum: Arthropoda
- Class: Insecta
- Order: Lepidoptera
- Family: Oecophoridae
- Genus: Tachystola
- Species: T. mulliganae

Binomial name
- Tachystola mulliganae Sterling, Plant & Lees, 2023

Species of moth

Tachystola mulliganae is a moth of the family Oecophoridae. It is native to Western Australia. The species was named after the woman who discovered the specimen, Barbara Mulligan.
