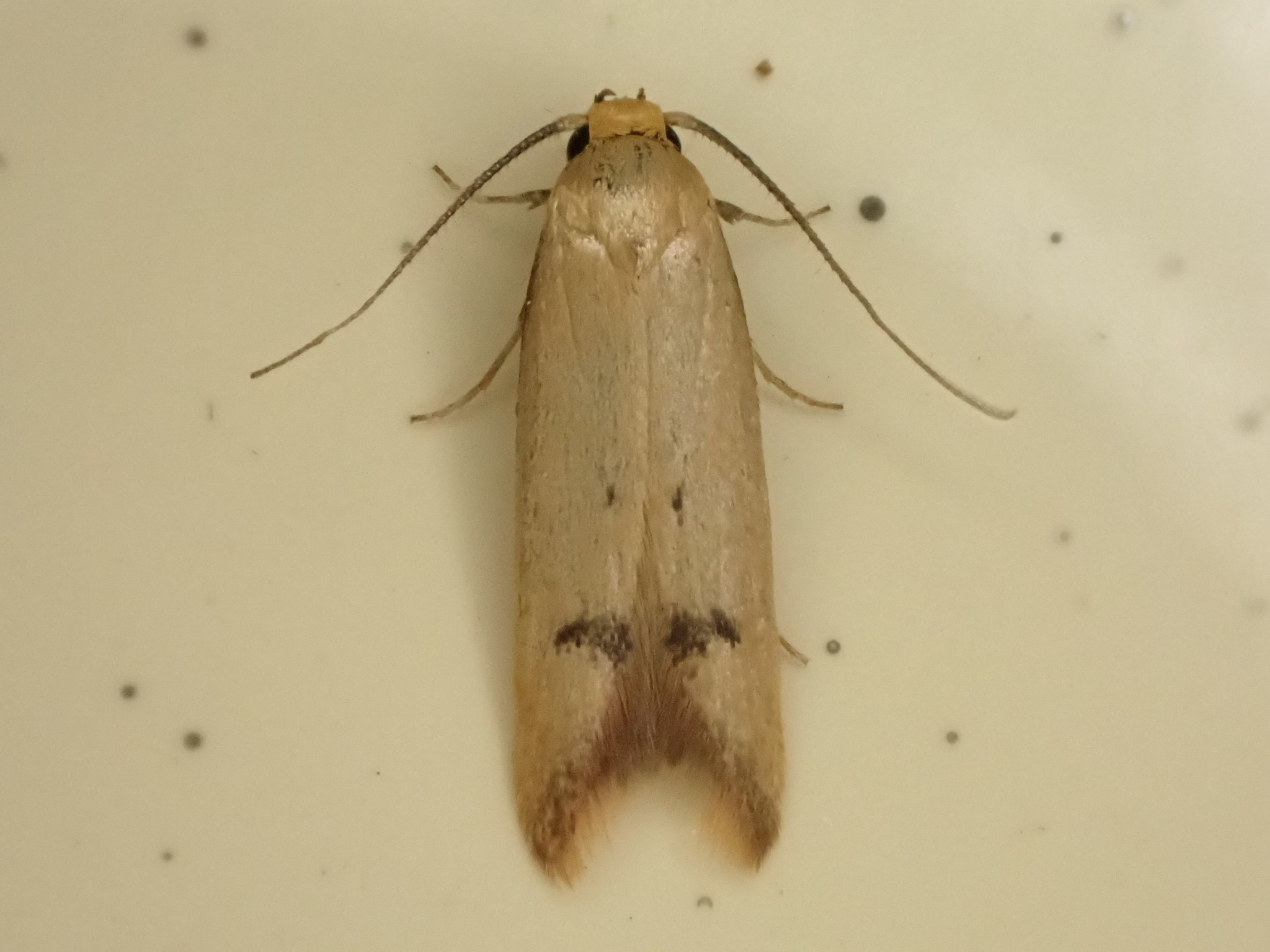

Scientific classification
- Domain: Eukaryota
- Kingdom: Animalia
- Phylum: Arthropoda
- Class: Insecta
- Order: Lepidoptera
- Family: Oecophoridae
- Genus: Tachystola
- Species: T. hemisema

Binomial name
- Tachystola hemisema Meyrick, 1885

= Tachystola hemisema =

Species of moth

Tachystola hemisema is a moth of the family Oecophoridae. It is native to Australia, but is an invasive species in New Zealand and the United States, probably imported with Australian plants.
