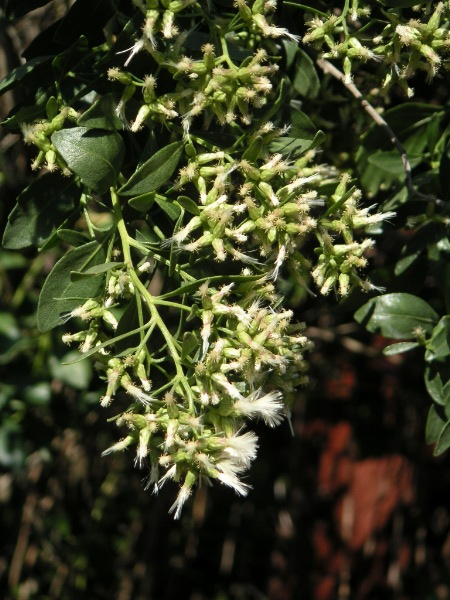

Scientific classification
- Kingdom: Plantae
- Clade: Tracheophytes
- Clade: Angiosperms
- Clade: Eudicots
- Clade: Asterids
- Order: Asterales
- Family: Asteraceae
- Genus: Baccharis
- Species: B. halimifolia

Binomial name
- Baccharis halimifolia L.
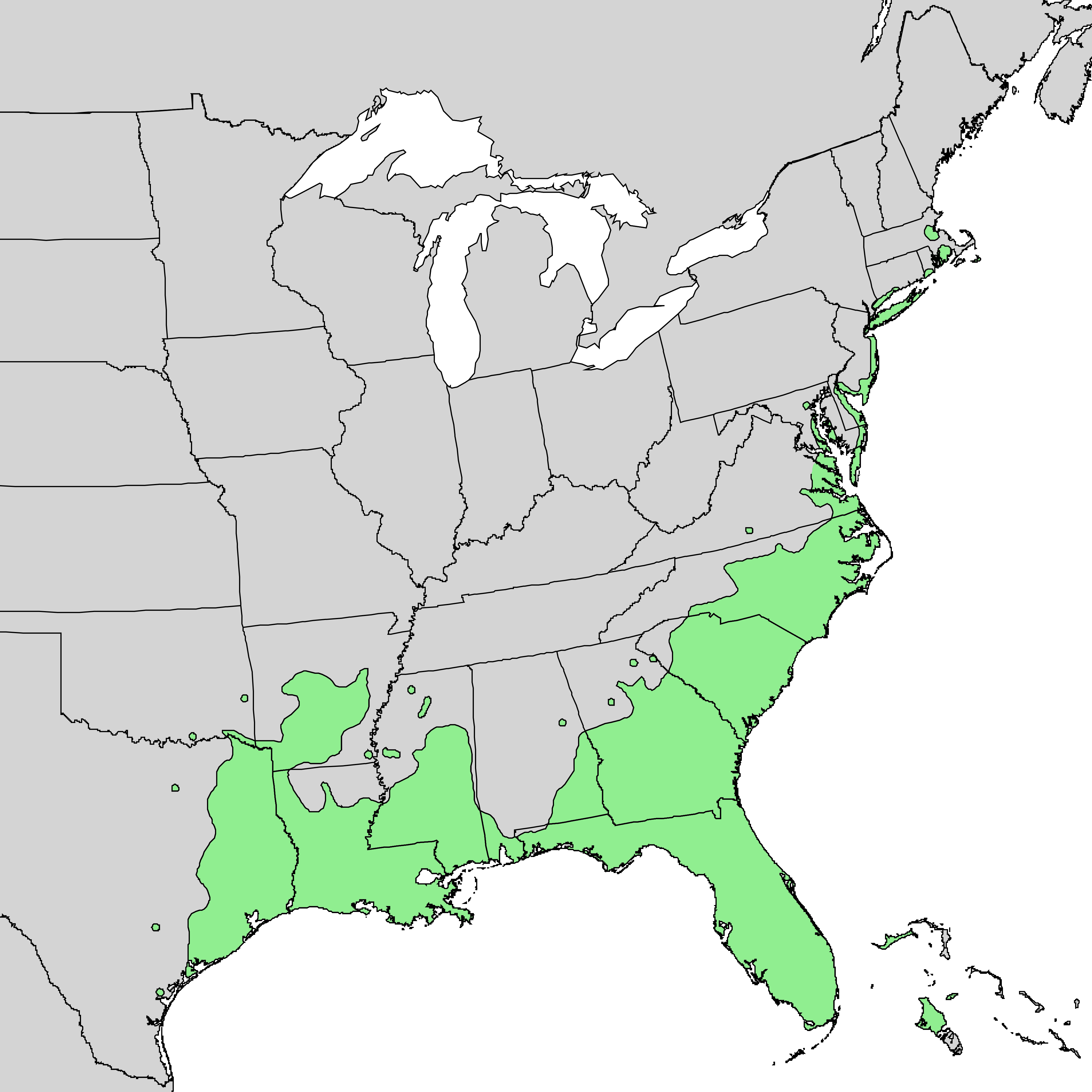
- Natural range of Baccharis halimifolia in United States + Bahamas

Synonyms
- Baccharis axillaris Mart. ex Baker; Baccharis halimifolia var. angustior DC.; Conyza halimifolia Desf.

= Baccharis halimifolia =

Species of flowering plant in the daisy family

Baccharis halimifolia is a North American species of shrubs in the family Asteraceae. It is native to Nova Scotia, the eastern and southern United States (from Massachusetts south to Florida and west to Texas and Oklahoma), eastern Mexico (Nuevo León, San Luis Potosí, Tamaulipas, Veracruz, Quintana Roo), the Bahamas, and Cuba.

Widely used common names include eastern baccharis, groundsel bush, sea myrtle, and saltbush. Consumption weed, cotton-seed tree, groundsel tree, menguilié, and silverling are also used more locally. In most of its range, where no other species of the genus occur, this plant is often simply called baccharis.

== Classification ==
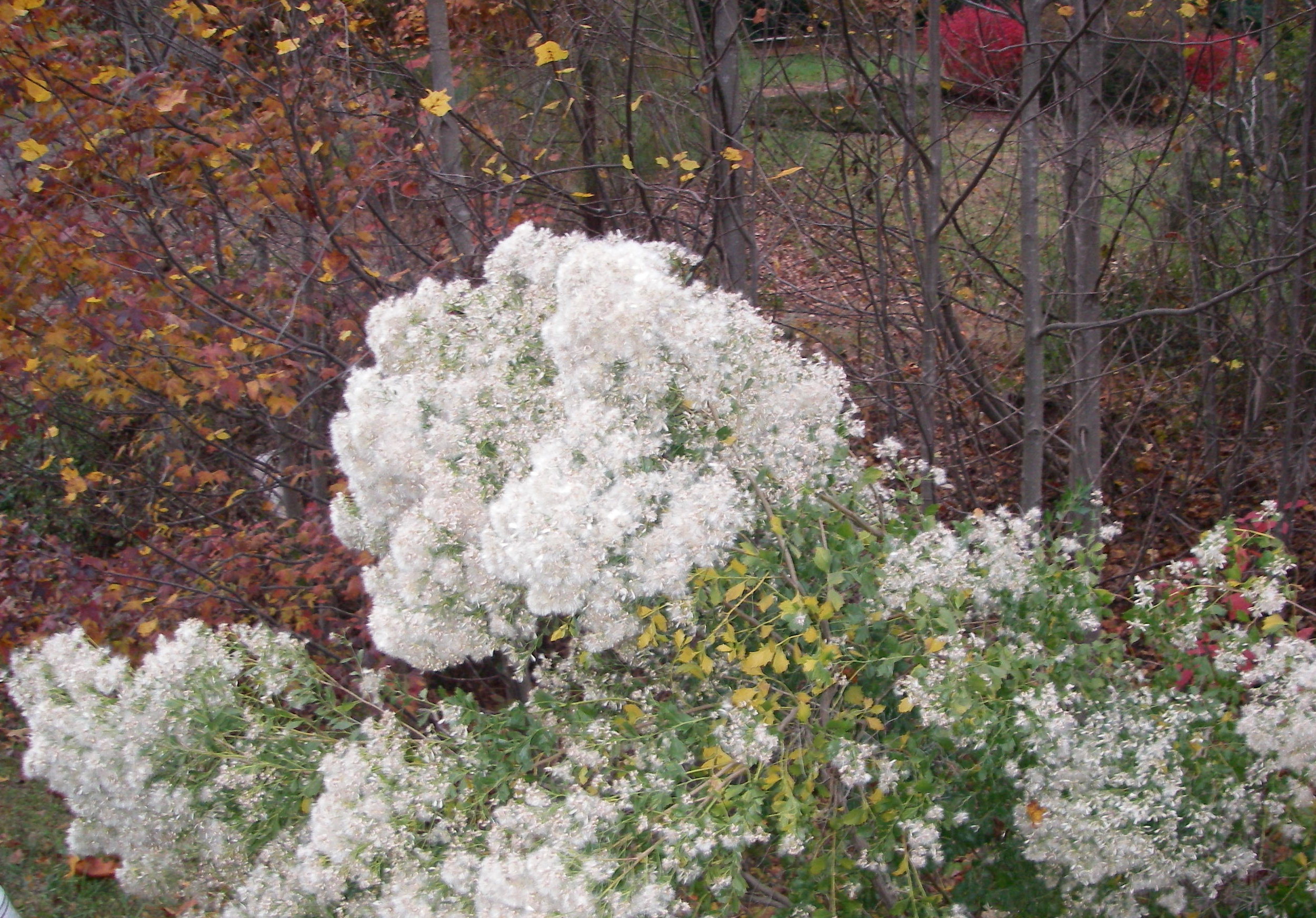
Fruiting Baccharis halimifolia in late autumn in central North Carolina

Baccharis halimifola was first described and named by Carl Linnaeus in his Species Plantarum, published in 1753. No subspecies or varieties are recognized within the species.

This species is the northernmost member of the large Western Hemisphere genus Baccharis in the aster family (Asteraceae).

Senecio arborescens, a Neotropical species, was confused with Baccharis halimifolia in the past.

== Description ==
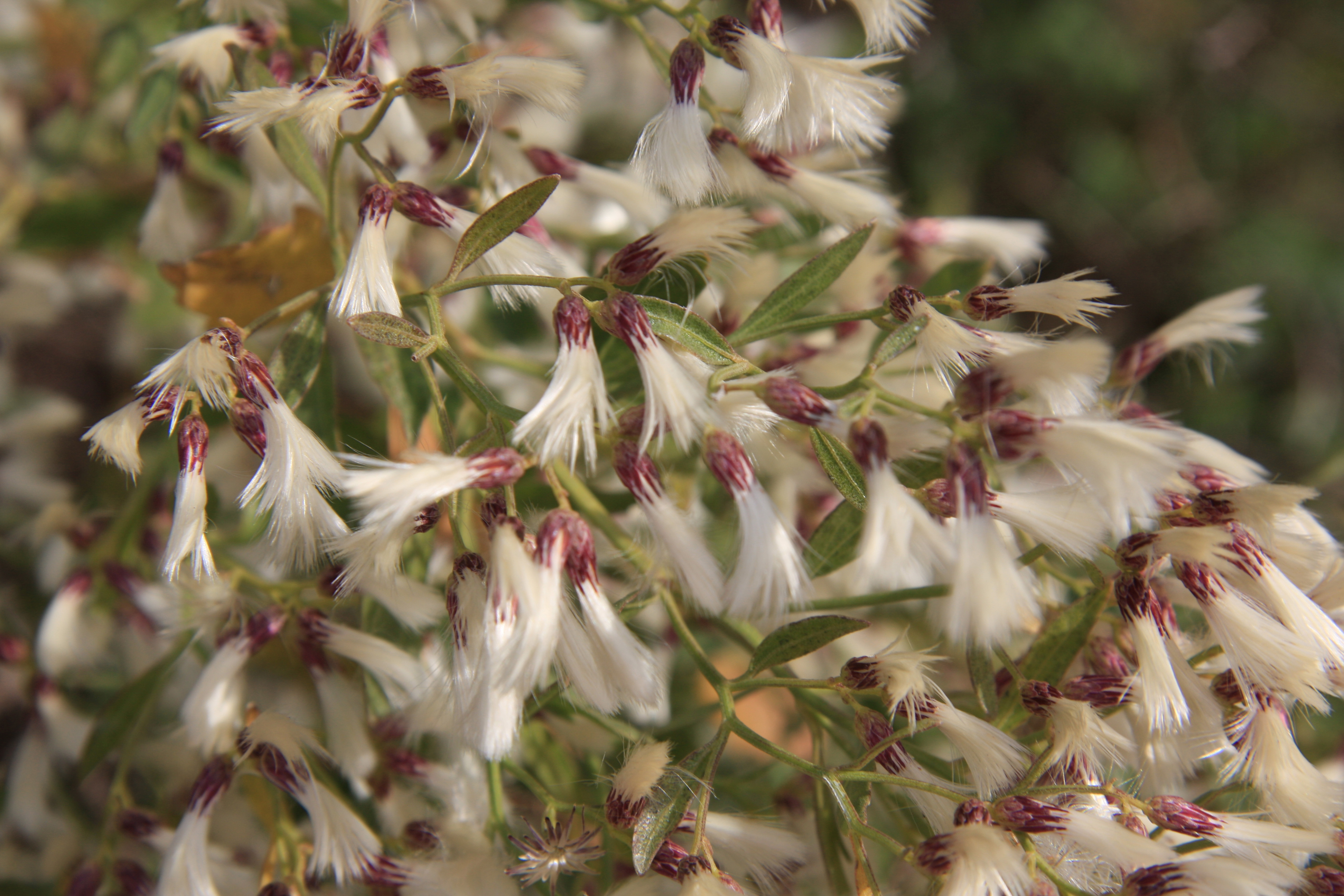
Late fall flowerheads, with purple sheath around silky white pappus

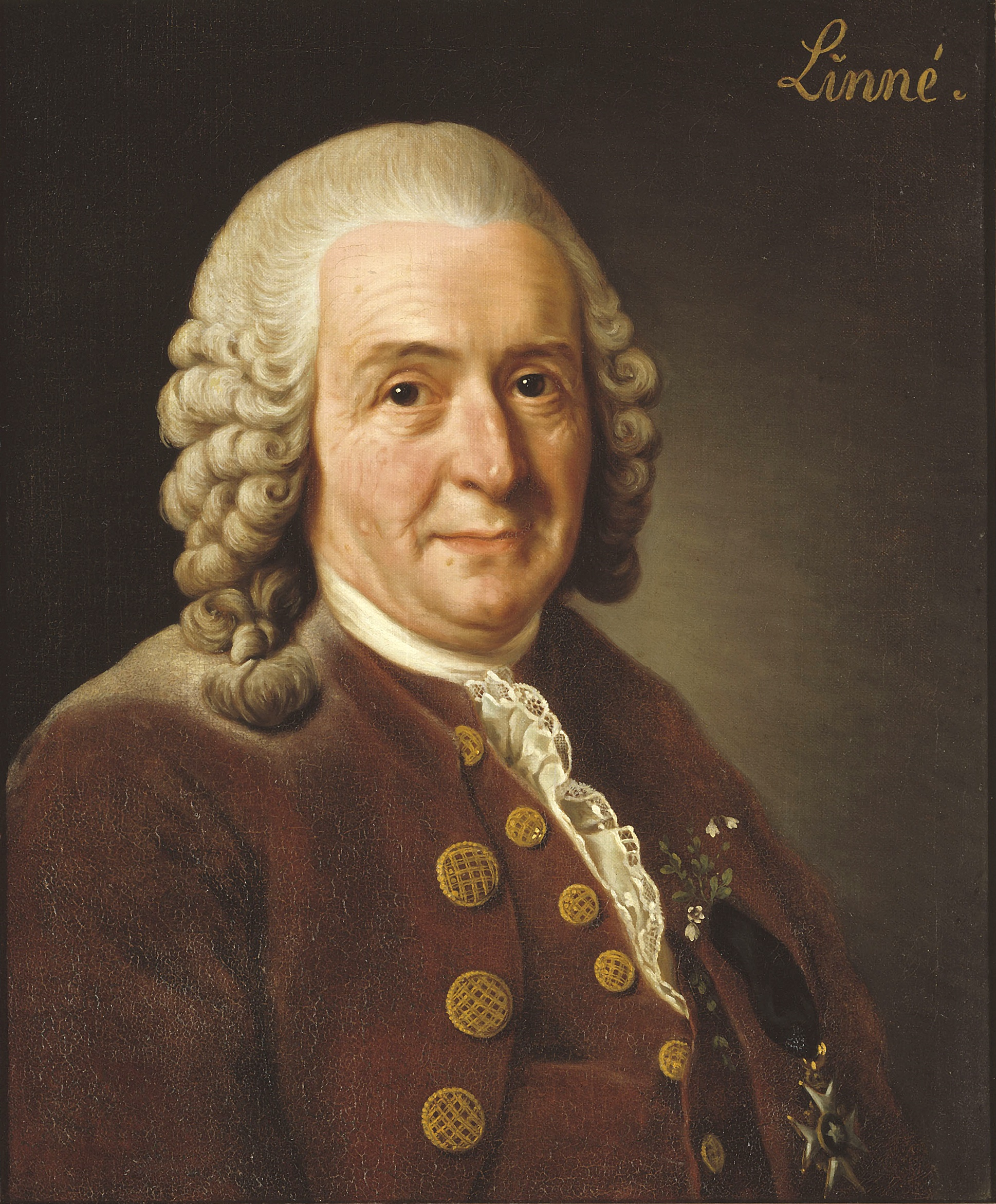
Carl Linnaeus, who first named and described Baccharis halimifolia (1775 portrait by Alexander Roslin)

Baccharis halimifolia is a fall-flowering shrub growing to about 12 ft (4 m) high and comparably wide, or occasionally a small tree. Its simple, alternate, thick, egg-shaped to rhombic leaves mostly have coarse teeth, with the uppermost leaves entire. These fall-flowering Baccharis plants are dioecious, with male and female flowers on separate individuals. Their flowers are borne in numerous small, compact heads in large leafy terminal inflorescences, with the snowy-white, cotton-like female flower-heads showy and conspicuous at a distance.

The species is sometimes confused with the marsh-elder (Iva frutescens), with which it often co-occurs, but the Baccharis has its leaves alternate, while those of the Iva are opposite.

== Ecology ==
Baccharis halimifolia, usually found in wetlands, is unusually salt-tolerant, and often found along salty or brackish shores of marshes and estuaries, and the inland shores of coastal barrier islands. In Florida, it is also found along ditches, in old fields, and in other disturbed areas. Other habitats in the northeastern United States include freshwater tidal marshes and open woods and thickets along the seacoast.

The flowers produce abundant nectar that attracts various butterflies, including the monarch (Danaus plexippus). These dense shrubs also provide wildlife food and cover.

== Invasiveness ==
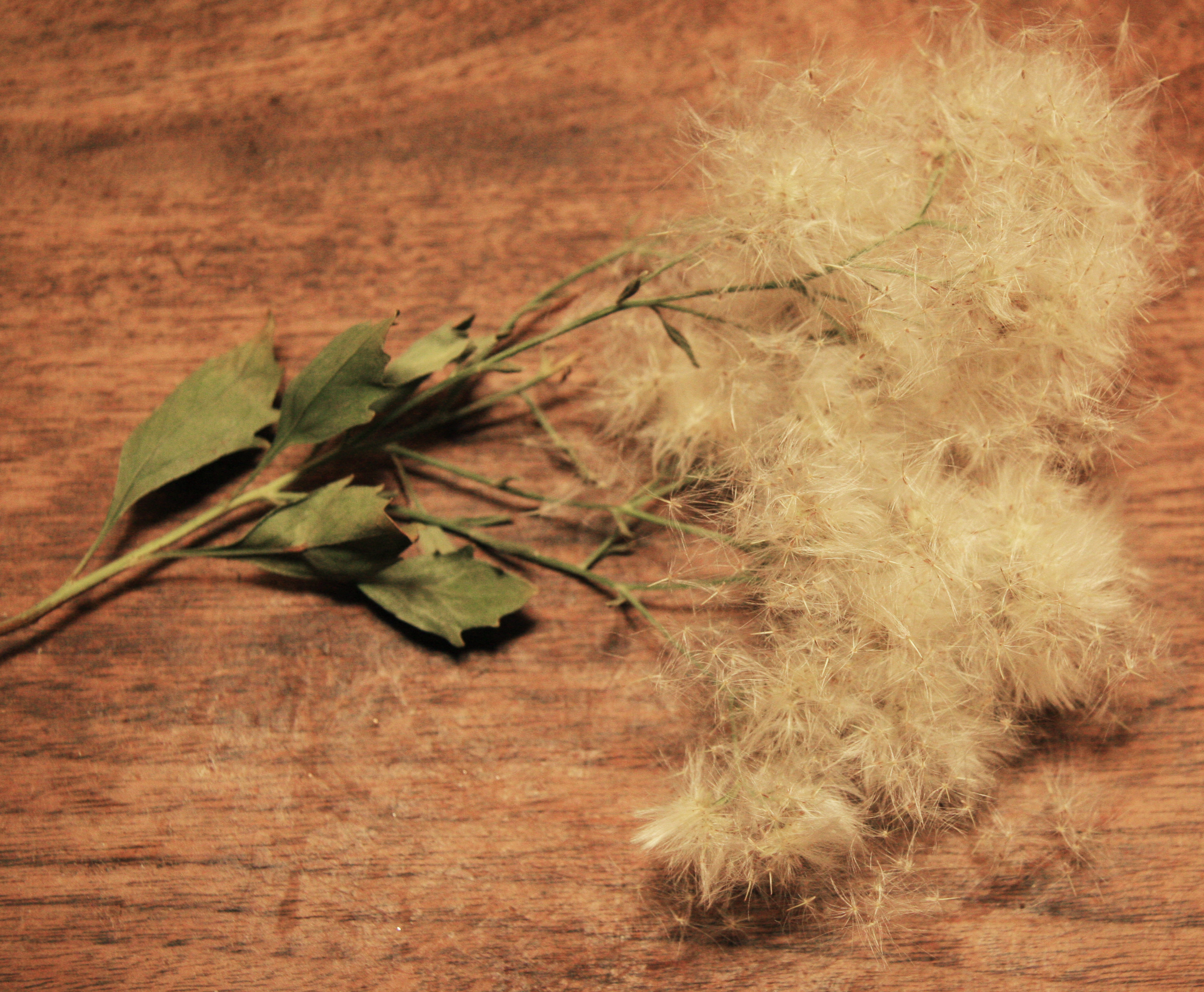
Leaves, and long thin seeds with fluffy hairs for windblown dispersal

The species has become naturalized in Europe and in New Zealand and considered invasive.

The species features since 2016 on the list of invasive alien species of Union concern. This means that import of the species and trade in the species is forbidden in the whole of the European Union.

In Australia, B. halimifolia is an invasive species along the coast of southern Queensland and New South Wales. As biological control the rust fungus Puccinia evadens is used. Furthermore, the lepidoptera Hellinsia balanotes (Meyrick, 1908), Aristotelia ivae Busck, 1900, Lorita baccharivora Pogue, 1988 and Prochoerodes truxaliata (Guenée, 1858) were released for its biological control.

In the northeastern United States, the species has become common well inland of the shrub's natural range along various major highways where road salt is heavily used, sometimes forming conspicuous displays when flowering in the fall, as along I-95 in Howard County, Maryland.

== Toxicity ==
The seeds of Baccharis halimifolia are toxic to humans.

== Uses ==
Baccharis halimifolia is occasionally cultivated and is considered useful as a hedge or border as well as a specimen plant. In southern Louisiana, it has been traditionally used as a medicine to treat inflamed kidneys and fever.

== Other references ==
- Blanchan, Neltje (2002). Wild Flowers: An Aid to Knowledge of our Wild Flowers and their Insect Visitors. Project Gutenberg Literary Archive Foundation.
- Niering, William, Olmstead, Nancy, National Audubon Society Field Guide to North American Wildflowers Eastern Region, 1995, ISBN 0-394-50432-1, p. 367
