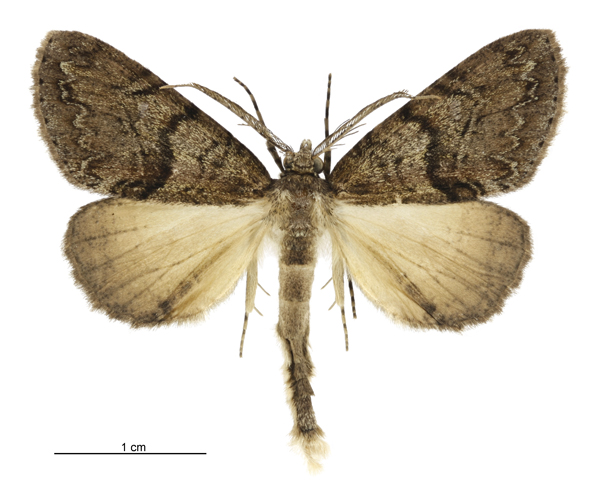
- Male
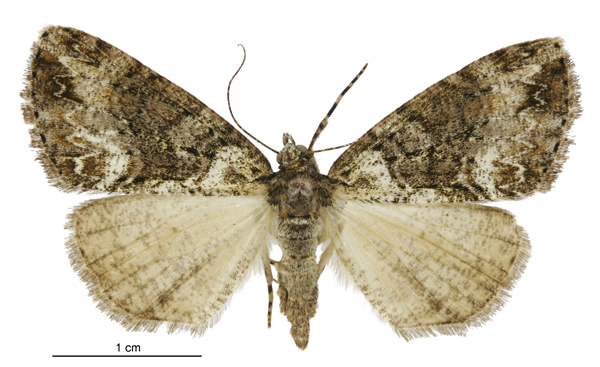
- Female

Scientific classification
- Kingdom: Animalia
- Phylum: Arthropoda
- Clade: Pancrustacea
- Class: Insecta
- Order: Lepidoptera
- Family: Geometridae
- Genus: Pseudocoremia
- Species: P. suavis

Binomial name
- Pseudocoremia suavis (Butler, 1879)

Synonyms
- Pachycnemia usitata Butler, 1879; Selidosema suavis (Butler, 1879)

= Pseudocoremia suavis =

Species of moth

Pseudocoremia suavis, the common forest looper, is a species of moth in the family Geometridae. It is regarded as being endemic to New Zealand. In 2007, however, the moth was found in west Cornwall, Great Britain, the first time it has been found outside of New Zealand.

== Range ==
The common forest looper is endemic and common throughout New Zealand feeding on many species of trees and shrubs. An unidentified specimen was caught on 15 April 2007 by Tony James at a regular garden light trap, approximately, near Tregonning Hill in the parish of Breage. By October a further four were caught in the same garden; although it took a year before the specimens were identified by the Natural History Museum, London. The garden is adjacent to a small plant nursery and it is possible the moth may have been introduced on plants from another British nursery.

== Life cycle ==
The descriptions below are mainly from an individual female caught on 30 October 2015 in west Cornwall and retained for breeding. The larvae were reared at 15–20 °C, in air-tight plastic boxes.

=== Egg ===
The female laid sixty eggs, some individually but most in groups of fourteen to twenty along the edge of tissue paper. When laid the eggs were dark green turning to brownish purple after seven days. After seventeen days the larvae hatched eating the egg cases. In New Zealand breeding experiments many females laid over one hundred eggs.

=== Larva ===
The larvae feed on a wide range of trees and shrubs and have caused serious defoliation in exotic plantations in New Zealand on two occasions. In the 1950s and early 1960s in mostly Monterey pine (Pinus radiata) plantations in Canterbury (including Eyrewell Forest), and in the 1970s, Douglas fir (Pseudotsuga menziesii) plantations on the North Island.

=== Pupa ===
The pupae were 10–12 mm long, green at first turning mahogany-brown within two days. Pupation took two to three days.

=== Imago ===
The wingspan is about 30 mm.

== Food plants ==
The larvae feed on a wide range of plants in New Zealand including southern beech (Nothofagus spp.), podocarps and kanuka (Kunzea ericoides). They also feed on European gorse (Ulex europaeus). Some of the Cornish larvae initially fed on Leyland cypress (Cupressus × leylandii) and were moved to Scots pine (Pinus sylvestris) in the second instar when they became unhealthy. They also fed on box (Buxus sempervirens) and yew (Taxus baccata) but preferred Scots pine.

== Parasites and predators ==
Larval parasitoid wasps of this species include Aleiodes declanae and Meteorus pulchricornis.
