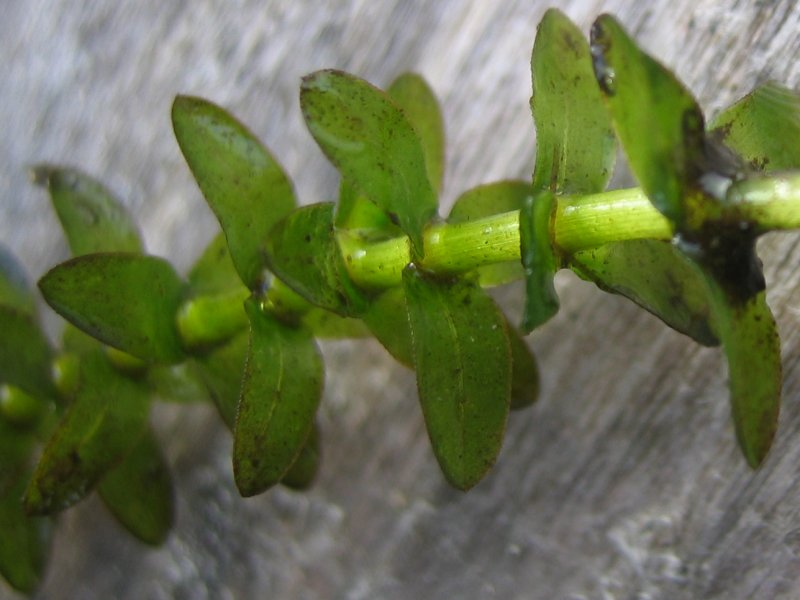
- Elodea canadensis foliage detail

Scientific classification
- Kingdom: Plantae
- Clade: Tracheophytes
- Clade: Angiosperms
- Clade: Monocots
- Order: Alismatales
- Family: Hydrocharitaceae
- Subfamily: Anacharioideae
- Genus: Elodea; Michx., 1803

Synonyms
- Anacharis Rich. (1808); Apalanthe Planch. (1848); Diplandra Bertero (1829); Egeria Planch. (1849); Hydora Besser (1832); Philotria Raf. (1818); Serpicula Pursh (1816); Udora Nutt. (1818)

= Elodea =

Genus of aquatic plants

Elodea is a genus of eight species of aquatic plants often called the waterweeds described as a genus in 1803. Classified in the frog's-bit family (Hydrocharitaceae), Elodea is native to the Americas and is also widely used as aquarium vegetation and laboratory demonstrations of cellular activities. It lives in fresh water. An older name for this genus is Anacharis, which serves as a common name in North America.

The introduction of some species of Elodea into waterways in parts of Europe, Australia, Africa, Asia, and New Zealand has created a significant problem and it is now considered a noxious weed in these areas.

Species

- Elodea bifoliata H.St.John – Canada (AB, SK), W United States (OR + CA to NM + MN)
- Elodea callitrichoides (Rich.) Casp. – Argentina, Uruguay
- Elodea canadensis Michx. – most of United States + Canada
- Elodea densa (Planch.) Casp.
- Elodea granatensis Bonpl. – much of South America
- Elodea heterostemon (S.Koehler & C.P.Bove) Byng & Christenh.
- Elodea najas (Planch.) Casp.
- Elodea nuttallii (Planch.) H.St.John – much of United States + Canada
- Elodea potamogeton (Bertero) Espinosa – Chile, Peru, Bolivia, Ecuador

== Chemical control ==
Chemical methods are ineffective in eradicating Elodea – at best they only slow growth for a season or two. As Elodea spreads into new ecosystems, it experiences rapid growth for 5–6 years and then slows as soil nutrients are used up. Elodea is threatening aquatic environments across Europe. Chemicals may be used in places that cause undue economic concerns, but very few aquatic herbicides are registered for aquatic use in the EU. Fluridone, the most commonly used aquatic herbicide is highly effective against Hydrilla, but only marginally effective against Elodea, especially at lower use rates.

== Mechanical control ==
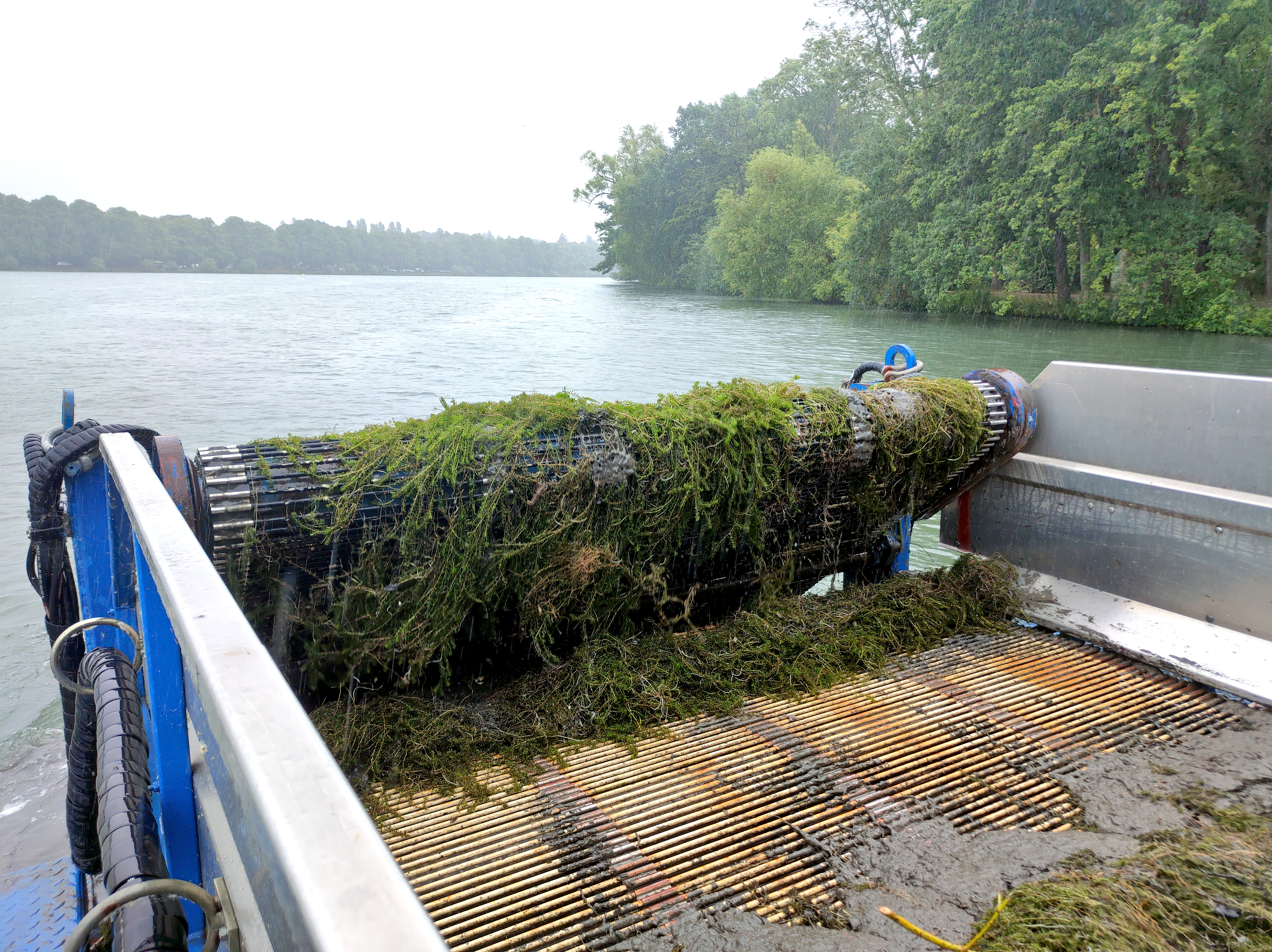
An aquatic weed harvester collecting Elodea from a lake

The plants can also be removed from lakes and rivers mechanically. They are extracted either by hand or by using rakes, chains, mowing boats or weed buckets. The problem is that through vegetative reproduction via fragments, mechanical removal methods can contribute to the spread of the plant. Torn fragments can be transported downstream or are introduced to new environments via attachment to boats and anchor chains.

== See also ==
- Grass carp—Effective against elodea
- Stormy Lake (Alaska)—A lake where Fluoridone was successfully used to eliminate elodea
