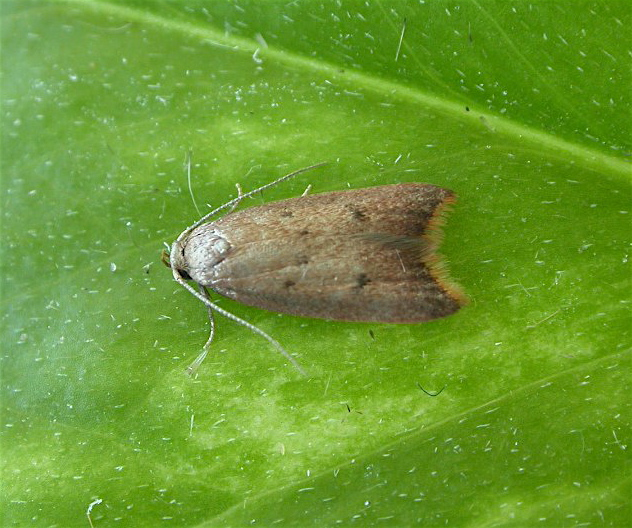
- Tachystola acroxantha

Scientific classification
- Kingdom: Animalia
- Phylum: Arthropoda
- Clade: Pancrustacea
- Class: Insecta
- Order: Lepidoptera
- Family: Oecophoridae
- Subfamily: Oecophorinae
- Genus: Tachystola; Meyrick, 1914

Synonyms
- Parocystola Turner, 1896

= Tachystola =

Genus of moths

Tachystola is a genus of the concealer moth family (Oecophoridae), in the Oecophorinae subfamily. It is an Australasian genus of fourteen species with one found in Europe, which is presumably an introduction.

== Species ==
Species include:

- Tachystola ptochodes (Turner 1917)
- Tachystola acroxantha (Meyrick 1885)
- Tachystola insinuata Meyrick 1914
- Tachystola proxena Meyrick 1914
- Tachystola hemisema Meyrick 1885
- Tachystola mulliganae Sterling, Plant & Lees 2023
- Tachystola thiasotis Meyrick 1885
- Tachystola pyrsopa Meyrick 1921
- Tachystola oxytora (Meyrick 1885)
- Tachystola anthera (Meyrick 1885)
- Tachystola cerochyta Turner 1940
- Tachystola phaeopyra (Turner 1927)
- Tachystola sidon (Meyrick 1913)
- Tachystola homoleuca Meyrick 1885
- Tachystola enoplia (Meyrick 1885)
