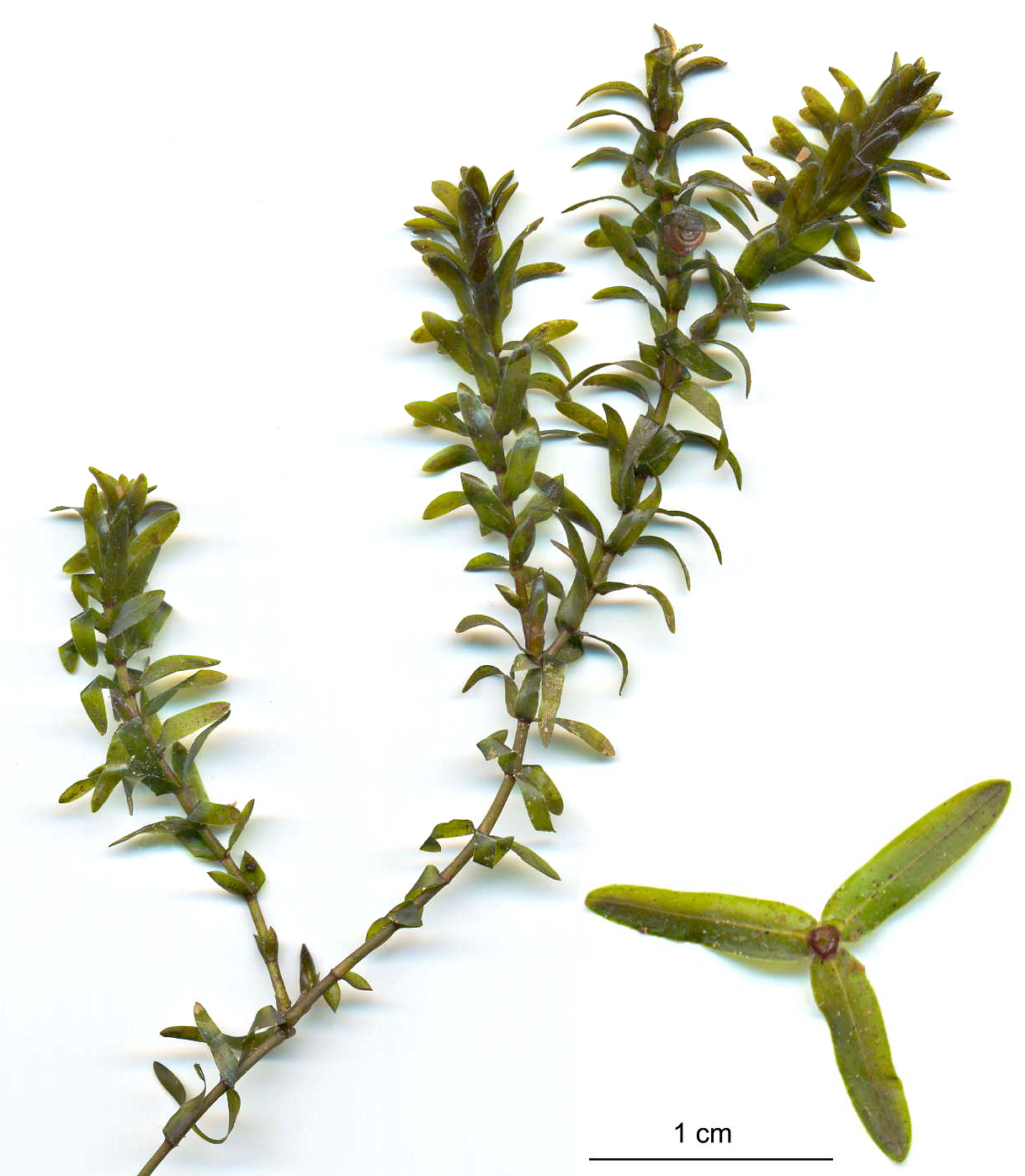

Conservation status
- Secure (NatureServe)

Scientific classification
- Kingdom: Plantae
- Clade: Tracheophytes
- Clade: Angiosperms
- Clade: Monocots
- Order: Alismatales
- Family: Hydrocharitaceae
- Genus: Elodea
- Species: E. canadensis

Binomial name
- Elodea canadensis Michx., 1803

Synonyms
- List: Anacharis alsinastrum Bab. ex Planch. (1849); Anacharis canadensis (Michx.) Planch. (1849); Anacharis linearis (Rydb.) Vict. (1931); Anacharis occidentalis (Pursh) Vict. (1931); Anacharis planchonii (Casp.) M.Peck (1941); Apalanthe schweinitzii Planch. (1848); Elodea brandegeeae H.St.John (1962); Elodea gigantea J.K.Santos (1923); Elodea ioensis Wylie (1913); Elodea iowensis Wylie rovis.; Elodea latifolia Casp. (1857); Elodea linearis (Rydb.) H.St.John (1965); Elodea oblongifolia Michx. ex Casp. (1858); Elodea occidentalis (Pursh) H.St.John (1920); Elodea planchonii Casp. (1857); Elodea schweinitzii (Planch.) Casp. (1857); Hydora canadensis (Michx.) Besser (1832); Philotria angustifolia (Muhl.) Britton ex Rydb. (1906); Philotria iowensis Wylie (1911); Philotria linearis Rydb. (1908); Philotria canadensis (Michx.) Britton (1895); Philotria occidentalis (Pursh) House (1921); Philotria planchonii (Casp.) Rydb. (1908); Serpicula canadensis (Michx.) Eaton (1833); Serpicula occidentalis Pursh (1816); Serpicula verticillata Rostk. & W.L.E.Schmidt (1824); Serpicula verticillata var. angustifolia Muhl. (1813); Udora canadensis (Michx.) Nutt. (1818)

= Elodea canadensis =

Species of aquatic plant

Elodea canadensis (American waterweed or Canadian waterweed or pondweed) is a perennial aquatic plant, or submergent macrophyte, native to most of North America. It has been introduced widely to regions outside its native range.

== Distribution ==
The native range of the species includes most of North America, from British Columbia east to Nova Scotia, south to California, and southeast to northern Florida, in rivers and lakes from sea level up to 2,000 m (6,600 ft) altitude, primarily in lime-rich waters.

== Description ==
Young plants initially start with a seedling stem with roots growing in mud at the bottom of the water; further adventitious roots are produced at intervals along the stem, which may hang free in the water or anchor into the bottom. It grows indefinitely at the stem tips, and single specimens may reach lengths of 3 m (9.8 ft) or more.

The leaves are bright green, translucent, oblong, 6–17 mm long and 1–4 mm broad, borne in whorls of three (rarely two or four) round the stem. It lives entirely underwater, the only exception being the small white or pale purple flowers which float at the surface and are attached to the plant by delicate stalks. These stalks, or hypanthia, are the lower part of the petals joined to form a floral tube. This floral tube can be up to 30 cm (12 in) in length, while only 1 mm in width, for a length to width ratio of 300 fold. However, according to one article, this ratio can sometimes be as much as one thousandfold.

It is dioecious, with male and female flowers on different plants. The flowers have three small white petals; male flowers have 4.5–5 mm petals and nine stamens, female flowers have 2–3 mm petals and three fused carpels. The fruit is an ovoid capsule, about 6 mm long containing several seeds that ripen underwater. The seeds are 4–5 mm long, spindle-shaped and smooth. It flowers from May to October.

It grows rapidly in favorable conditions and can choke shallow ponds, canals, and the margins of some slow-flowing rivers. It requires summer water temperatures of 10–25 °C and moderate-to-bright light levels.

It is closely related to Elodea nuttallii, which generally has narrower leaves under 2 mm broad. It is usually fairly easy to distinguish from its relatives, like the Brazilian Egeria densa and Hydrilla verticillata. These all have leaves in whorls around the stem; however, Elodea usually has three leaves per whorl, whereas Egeria and Hydrilla usually have four or more. Egeria densa is also a larger, bushier plant, with longer leaves.

== Cultivation and uses ==
It is frequently used as an aquarium plant. Propagation is by cuttings.

== As an invasive species ==
It is an invasive species in Europe, Asia, Africa, and Oceania. Europe has been particularly affected, with the first records dating back as far as 1836 in County Down, Ireland, and in Great Britain in 1841; it is now abundant in both Ireland and Great Britain. The species' presence has been confirmed in all continental European countries, spreading through ponds, ditches and streams, which were often choked with its rank growth.

== Gallery ==
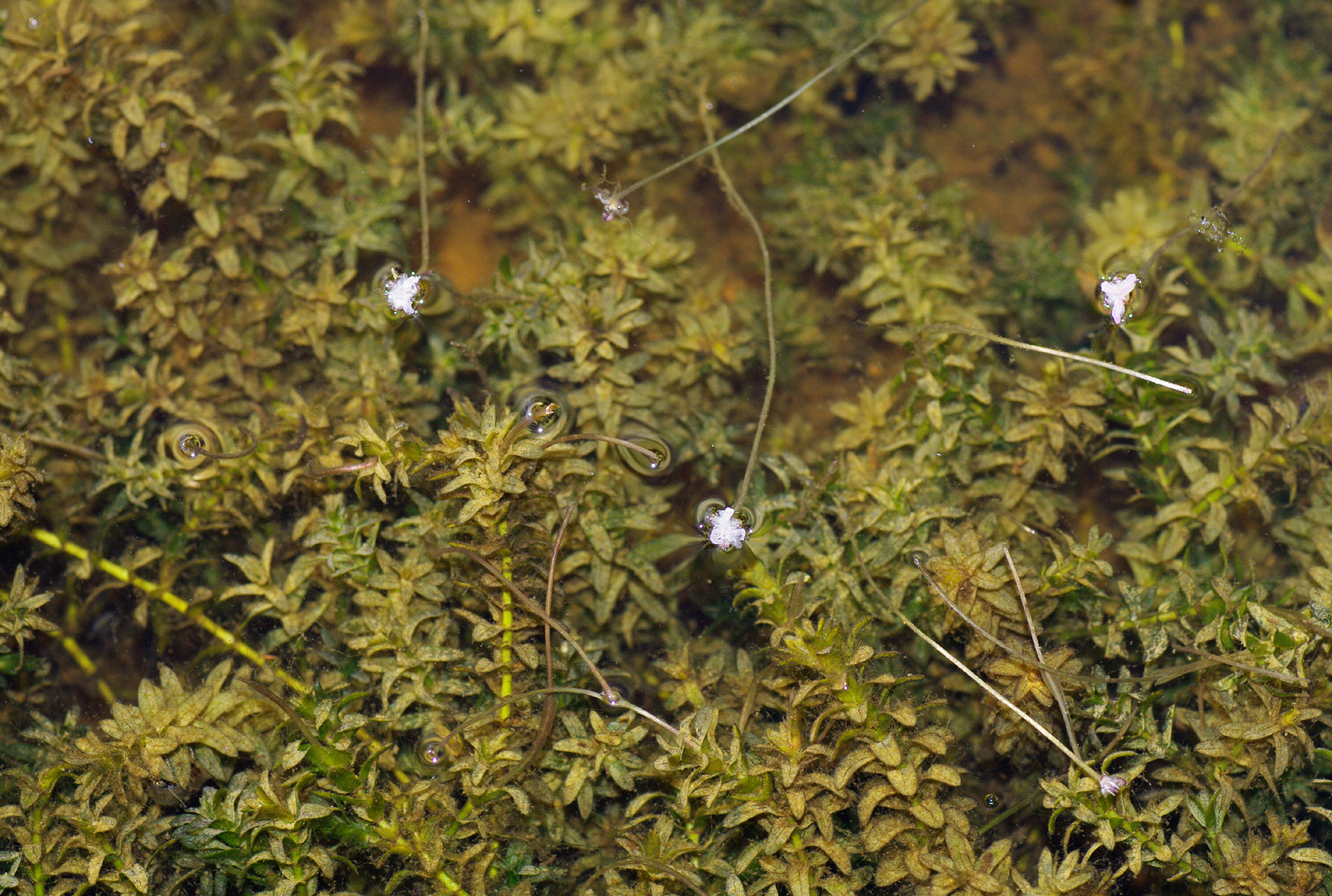
Ditch with a dense colony of flowering plants

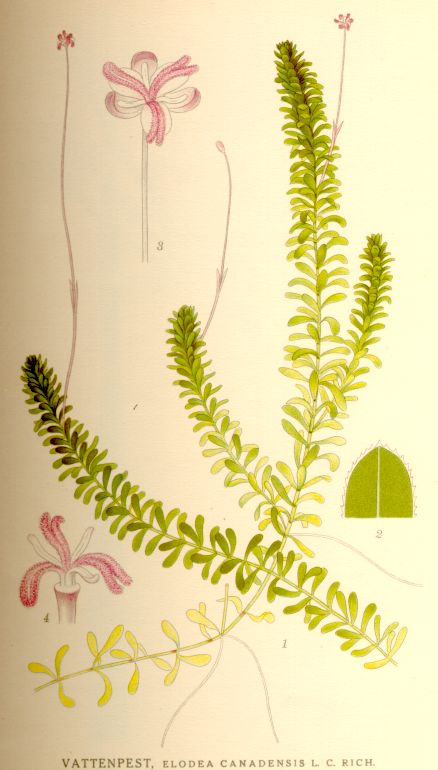
Illustration showing leaf and flower detail

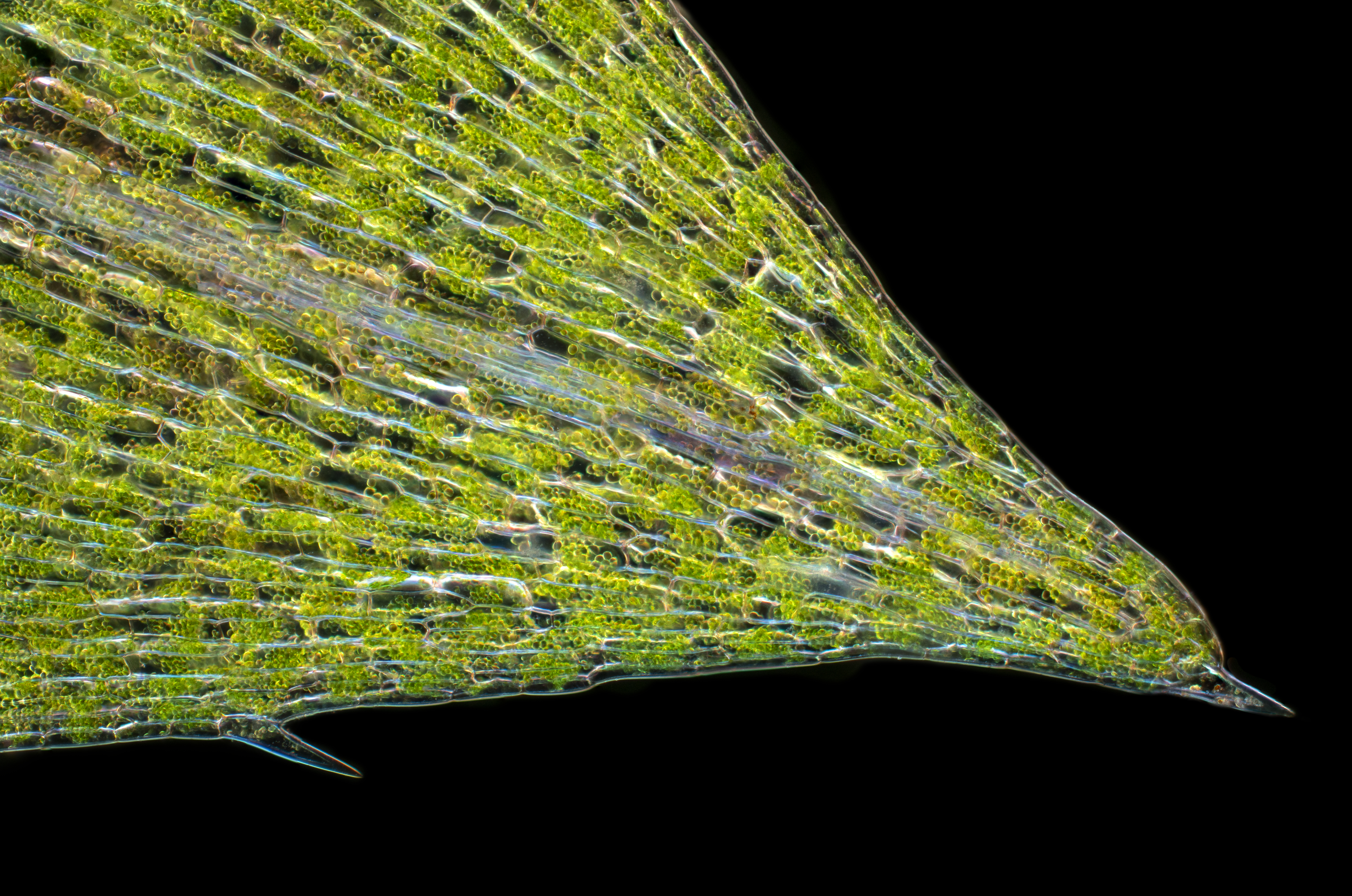
Close up image of the leaf tip
