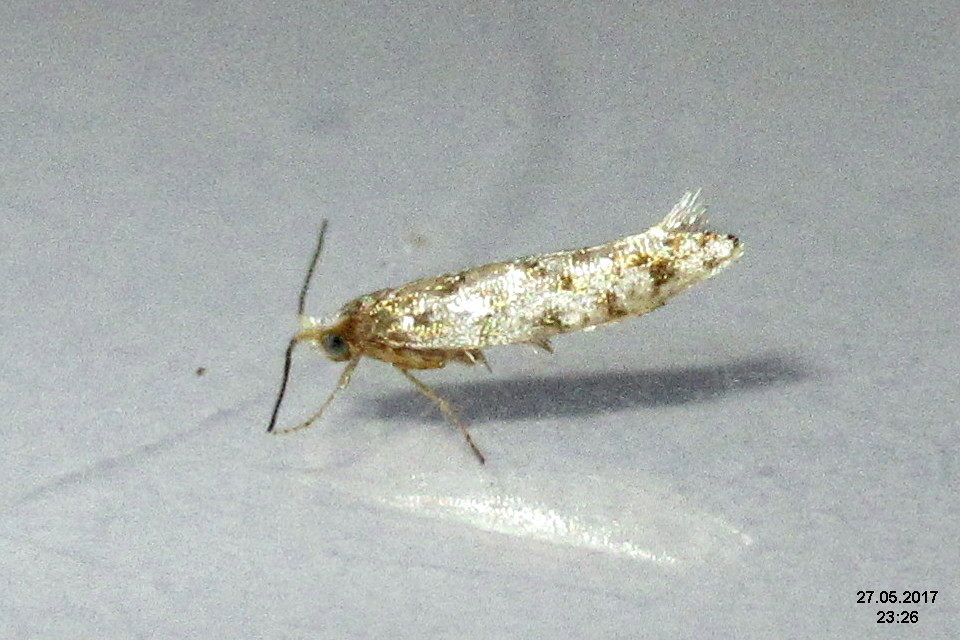
- Argyresthia cupressella England
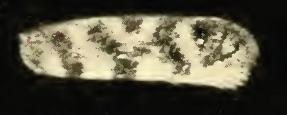
- Wing

Scientific classification
- Domain: Eukaryota
- Kingdom: Animalia
- Phylum: Arthropoda
- Class: Insecta
- Order: Lepidoptera
- Family: Argyresthiidae
- Genus: Argyresthia
- Species: A. cupressella

Binomial name
- Argyresthia cupressella Walsingham, 1890

= Argyresthia cupressella =

Cypress tip moth

Species of moth

Argyresthia cupressella, the cypress tip moth, is a moth of the family Yponomeutidae. It is endemic to the western coast of the United States and Canada, but has been introduced in Europe.

The wingspan is 8–9 mm. Adults are on wing from June to July depending on the location.

The larvae feed on Chamaecyparis, Cupressocyparis, Thuja, Sequoia and Juniperus species.
