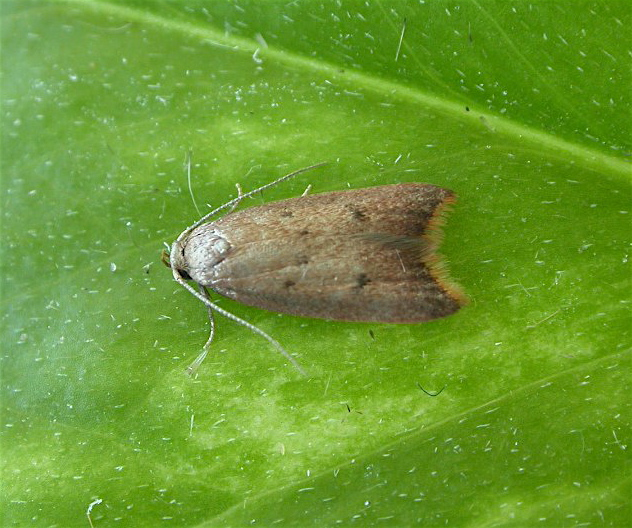

Scientific classification
- Kingdom: Animalia
- Phylum: Arthropoda
- Clade: Pancrustacea
- Class: Insecta
- Order: Lepidoptera
- Family: Oecophoridae
- Genus: Tachystola
- Species: T. acroxantha

Binomial name
- Tachystola acroxantha (Meyrick, 1885)

Synonyms
- Ocystola acroxantha Meyrick, 1885; Parocystola acroxantha (Meyrick, 1885); Ocystola aethopis sensu Clutterbuck, 1910

= Tachystola acroxantha =

Species of moth

Tachystola acroxantha is a moth of the family Oecophoridae. It is native to Australia, but is an invasive species in New Zealand and Europe, probably imported with Australian plants.

== Description ==
The wingspan is 13–15 mm. In Britain the moth flies from late-April to September, possibly in two extended generations or in a succession of broods. It comes to light and has been found in gardens, heath and in a flour mill.

Egg

Undescribed.

Larvae

Length 11–14 mm. The body is a translucent greyish white to creamy white with the gut showing as a darker dorsal line, which gives a larva the appearance of being grey. Its head is brown with darker mandibles.

In Australia the larvae have been found between flat spun, fallen Eucalyptus leaves, on the ground or on fallen branches, favouring moist leaves. In Great Britain, Alexander Allen obtained eggs from a captured female and saw the larvae initially feeding gregariously in a silken web and as they grew they fed alone. Some ate withered leaves, but all the larvae preferred fresh leaves. The first wild larvae found in Great Britain was in the garden of the Natural History Museum, London (BMNH) in March 1998. They were in loose silken tubes covered with leaf-fragments and frass, between dry, layered leaves of London plane (Platanus × hispanica). Larvae have also been recorded as feeding on Berberis species.

Pupa

The pupa is found in the larval feeding place between spun leaves. It is in a loose inner cocoon, which is spun within a tough outer silken one covered in frass.

== Distribution ==
The moth is native to Australia (New South Wales, Tasmania and Victoria), and has been introduced to New Zealand and Great Britain, most certainly on imported plants. In Britain it was first taken in 1908 at Ottery St Mary, Devon and is now found in the south of England and in Cheshire and Lancashire.
