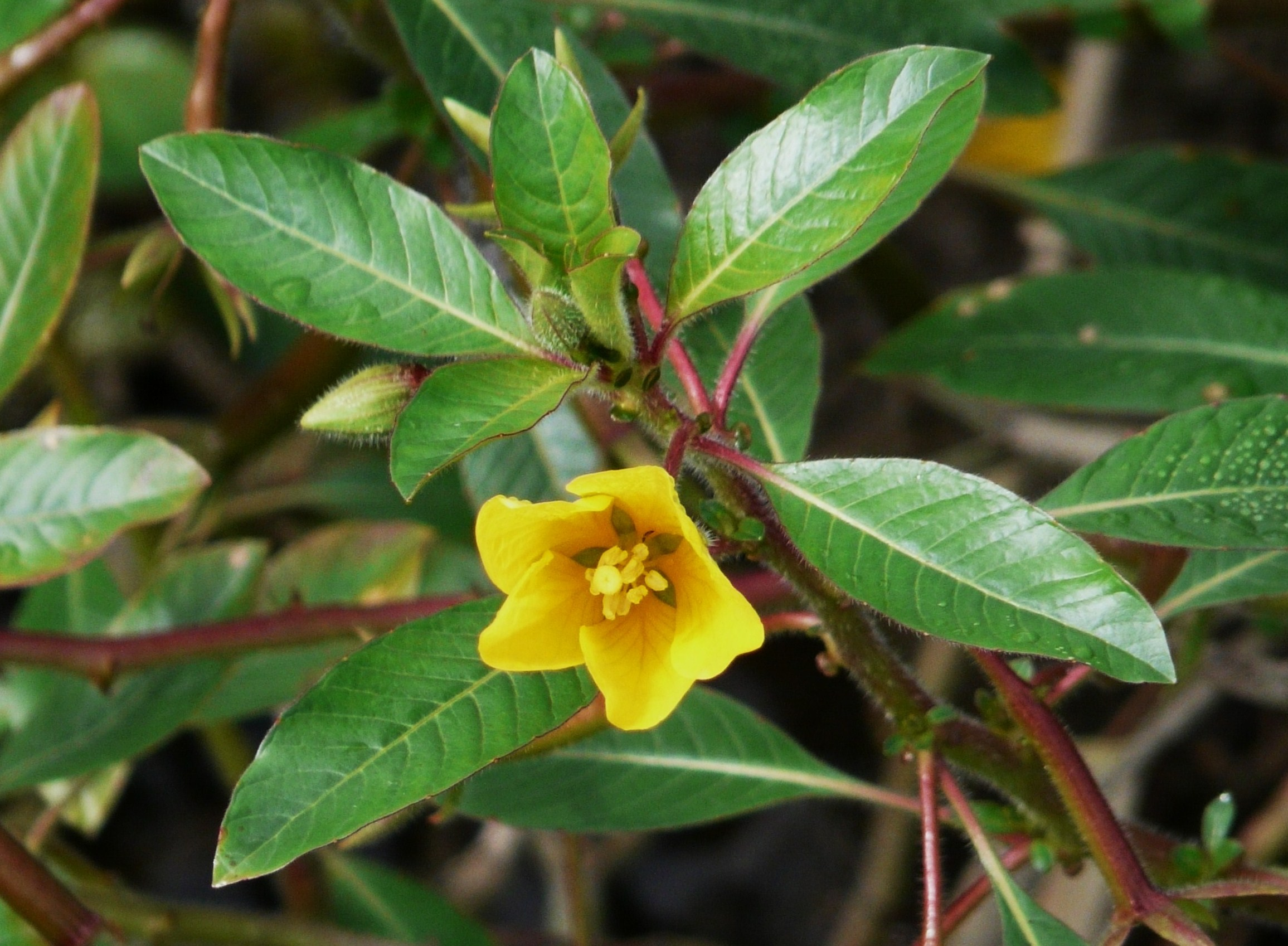
- Lugwigia peploides flower

Scientific classification
- Kingdom: Plantae
- Clade: Tracheophytes
- Clade: Angiosperms
- Clade: Eudicots
- Clade: Rosids
- Order: Myrtales
- Family: Onagraceae
- Genus: Ludwigia
- Species: L. peploides

Binomial name
- Ludwigia peploides (Kunth) P.H.Raven

= Ludwigia peploides =

Species of flowering plant

Ludwigia peploides is a species of flowering plant in the evening primrose family known by the common names floating primrose-willow and creeping water primrose. It is native to Australia, North America, and South America, but it can be found on many continents and spreads easily to become naturalized. It is well known as a troublesome aquatic noxious weed that invades water ecosystems and can clog waterways. This is perennial herb which grows in moist to wet to flooded areas. The stem can creep over 2 meters long, sometimes branching. It spreads to form mats on the mud, or floats ascending in the water. The leaves are several centimeters long and are borne in alternately arranged clusters along the stem. The flower has 5 to 6 lance-shaped sepals beneath a corolla of 5 or 6 bright yellow petals up to 2.4 centimeters long. The fruit is a hard, cylindrical capsule.

== Distribution ==
Ludwigia peploides is native to Australia, North America, and South America.

=== In the US ===
In the US it can be found predominately along the east and southwest coasts.

=== In Europe ===
L. peploides has established a significant presence as an invasive species, and has caused serious problems in areas where it has been introduced, presenting challenges to ecologies and infrastructure. In France, L. peploides now tops the list of the most invasive aquatic plants in the nation.

An estimate of its areas of heaviest dispersion might be gleaned from records of public action against it. Bans on the trade of L. peploides have been enacted in the contiguous nations of France, Netherlands, and Belgium, as well as in United Kingdom and Portugal, and there are reports that it has now also been found in Croatia.

== Habitat, ecology and dispersal ==
The genus Ludwigia is present worldwide. There are 23 sections consisting of 82 species in total. They can be both woody, herbaceous and aquatic. They have very high levels of reproduction and efficient dispersal capacity which is a large factor in its ability to take over habitats all across the world.

Their reproduction is divided into four steps that coincide with the changing seasons. During the spring, new shoots form buds. If in shallow water, it is formed in an erect position, but if in a drained environment, they will adopt a creeping form. The stems will eventually rise to the waters surface and will then form rosettes and small round leaves. The next step occurs over the summer where apical and branches begin to form whether the species formed in an erect or creeping form. After an overall lateral extension of 50 cm flowers can begin to emerge. Between late June to early October, yellow flowers are produced and reproduction can occur. The sexual reproduction of these plants are relatively unknown due to lack of research and can vary from species to species. In autumn, from August to November fruiting occurs. For the rest of the year, the winter months, the species will break up, dry out and decay but it has been seen that there are cases where it can survive.

Because Ludwigia can propagate from stem fragments or rhizomes broken off by wind, water flow or animals, they have been scattered across the globe. They can be broken as easily by wind, water flow or animals. Fragments of Ludwigia peploides can double in biomass in between 15 and 90 days. This allows this species to thrive in habitat and regions where sexual reproduction cannot occur.

The Ludwigia occur predominantly in wetlands and in the transition areas between aquatic and terrestrial environments. As a result of their high plasticity, Ludwigia can colonize almost anywhere in slow flowing waters, river banks and wet meadows. They prefer slow flowing water over water with a higher velocity. Most Ludwigia species where present in stagnant water, from .06 to 1 metre deep. Great depths became a constraint on their development but shoots were still able to form flower buds. If they are in a low nutrient condition, Ludwigia double their biomass. The only true weakness of this species is intense levels of salinity in the water they inhabit.

== Invasiveness ==
In Europe, Ludwigia peploides is included since 2016 in the list of Invasive Alien Species of Union concern (the Union list). This implies that this species cannot be imported, cultivated, transported, commercialized, planted, or intentionally released into the environment in the whole of the European Union.

== Morphology ==
Ludwigia peploides is an herbaceous perennial wetland plant, usually common along mud or a water surface. L. peploides sprawl flat along the mud or waters surface. It is very similar to the Ludwigia hexapetala and very difficult to tell apart. The leaves are arranged in clusters and vary in size. The average leaf is approximately 3.5 inches long and can be egg-shaped to lance-shaped. They are hairless and each leaf's base tappers off to a stalk that ranges from 1 to 1.5 inches. The stem can grow as long as 9 feet and can be hairless or slightly hairy but always has a fleshy texture.

== Flowers and fruits ==
Ludwigia peploides flowers start from the stem which float or lie on the ground. Each flower has five yellow petals 1 to 1.5 cm in length and occur on long stalks on each leaf axil. The fruits and seeds do not have extensive research done so the details are unclear, but there are capsules that contain many seeds. Each seed is approximately 1 mm in size.

== Societal impacts ==
The Ludwigia species cause dense mats which form a perfect protective habitat for mosquitoes. This causes higher rates of the West Nile virus and other diseases that mosquitoes commonly spread. They are also a serious nuisance for human activity. Leisure activities such as hunting, fishing, and boating can be extremely difficult. Flood risk increases due to the decrease in channel carry capacity. The rapid and uncontrolled growth of water primrose dominates native populations and can damage irrigation and drainage networks of water bodies. Fish can have a hard time moving through these dense Ludwigia populations, which then in turn affect the habitat of surface animals such as birds.

== Food ==
Luwigia peploides are not commonly ingested. They were traded originally for ornamental purposes.

== Medicinal ==
Ludwigia peploides are both melliferous and polliniferous. Numerous compounds which have medicinal properties are produced by the Ludwigia species such as saponins, tannins, polyphenols, alkaloids, linoleic acids, flavonoids, starch grains and calcium oxalate crystals. There are also three medical compounds which contribute to antioxidant activities. Lastly, there is a potential for water waste management in agriculture. Because the plant can accumulate high concentrations of nitrogen, it can decrease the levels of ammonia and nitrates in soil. All of these are only potential uses of the plant since there has been close to no investigation of its use. Further research is required for their medicinal and agricultural benefits to be harnessed.
