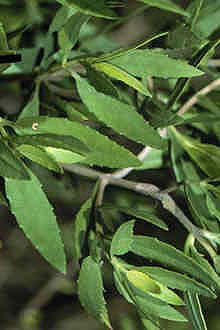

Conservation status
- Secure (NatureServe)

Scientific classification
- Kingdom: Plantae
- Clade: Tracheophytes
- Clade: Angiosperms
- Clade: Eudicots
- Clade: Asterids
- Order: Asterales
- Family: Asteraceae
- Tribe: Heliantheae
- Genus: Iva
- Species: I. frutescens

Binomial name
- Iva frutescens L.

Synonyms
- Iva oraria Bartlett

= Iva frutescens =

Species of flowering plant

Iva frutescens is a species of flowering plant in the family Asteraceae known by the common names Jesuit's bark, bigleaf marsh-elder, and high-tide bush. It grows in coastal eastern North America from Nova Scotia down the eastern coast and along the Gulf Coast to Texas.

Iva frutescens is a subshrub or shrub with erect stems up to 3.5 meters (almost 12 feet) tall. The leaves are lance-shaped or somewhat oval and have toothed edges. They are variable in size, measuring from 3 to 12 centimeters (1.2-5.0 inches) or more in length. The adaxial (upper) side of the leaf is often covered is small warts, helping to distinguish it from sympatric shrubs. The inflorescence is an elongated array of many small flower heads with whitish florets.

Iva frutescens is very common in salt marsh habitat throughout its native range. While it is tolerant of salinity, it is not very tolerant of flooding, so it tends to grow in a narrow band along the upper margins of marshes. The band may be just a few meters wide, and individuals nearest the water may be stunted. The largest individuals have their roots in water less than 7% of the time, and the longer the roots are submerged, the smaller the plants are. However, this slight tolerance of flooding allows the plant to compete with other species on the marsh margins. This competition on one side and flooding on the other keeps the plant restricted to a narrow band.

This species' position is in the malophe front line of waterway erosion. It sometimes grows on substrate that has been dredged and laid out along the edges of waterways.

This species provides habitat for salt marsh animals such as the marsh wren.
