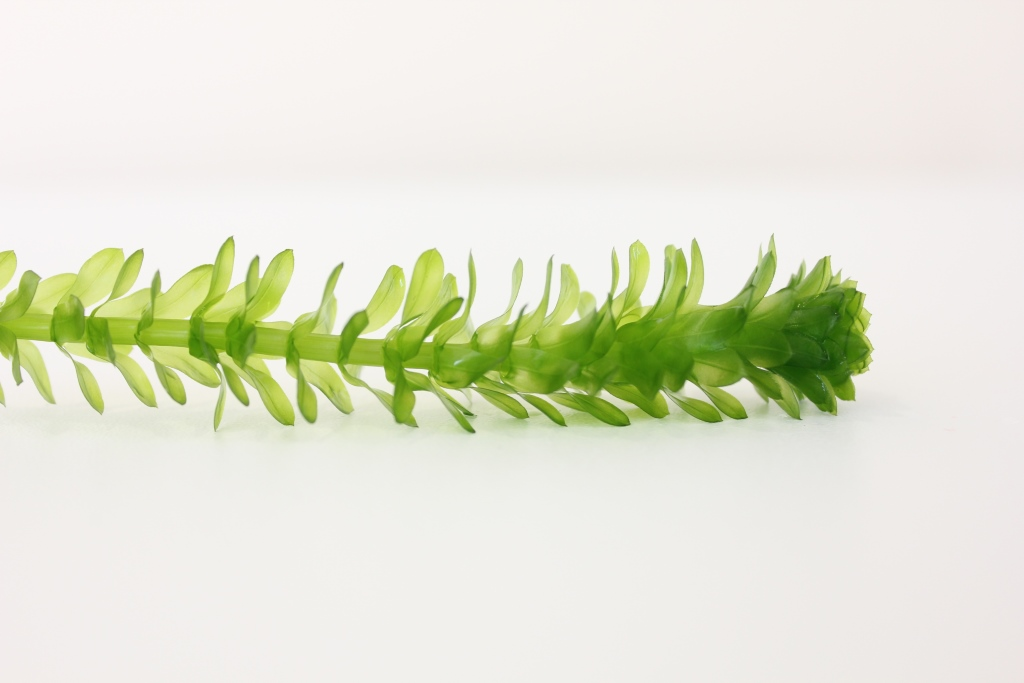

Scientific classification
- Kingdom: Plantae
- Clade: Embryophytes
- Clade: Tracheophytes
- Clade: Spermatophytes
- Clade: Angiosperms
- Clade: Monocots
- Order: Alismatales
- Family: Hydrocharitaceae
- Genus: Elodea
- Species: E. densa

Binomial name
- Elodea densa (Planch.) Casp., 1857

Synonyms
- Anacharis densa (Planch.) Vict. (1931); Egeria densa Planch. (1849); Philotria densa (Planch.) Small (1933); Udora densa (Planch.) M.R.Almeida (2009)

= Elodea densa =

South American species of aquatic plant

Elodea densa, the large-flowered waterweed or Brazilian waterweed, is a species of Elodea native to warm temperate South America in southeastern Brazil, Argentina, Chile, and Uruguay. It is considered a problematic invasive species due to its use in home aquariums and subsequent release into non-native ecosystems.

== Description ==
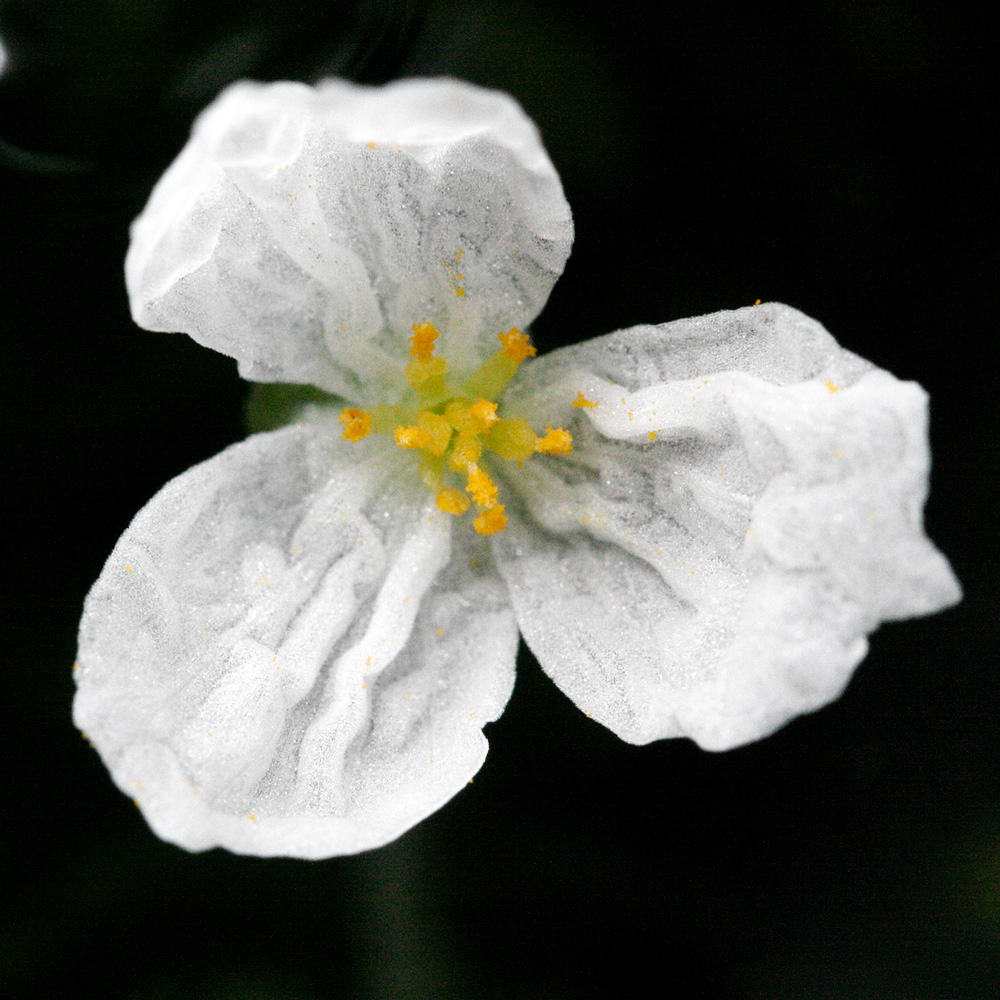
Elodea densa flower

Elodea densa is an aquatic plant growing in water up to 4 m (13 ft) deep, with trailing stems to 2 m (6.6 ft) or more long, producing roots at intervals along the stem. The leaves are produced in whorls of four to eight, 1–4 cm (0.39–1.57 in) long and 2–5 mm (0.079–0.197 in) broad, with a pointed leaf tip. The stem system of the plant will grow until it reaches the surface of the water, where it will begin to spread out, creating a thick flower canopy that blocks light from reaching plants below it. It is dioecious, with male and female flowers on separate plants; the flowers are 12–20 mm (0.47–0.79 in) diameter, with three broad, rounded, white petals, 8–10 mm (0.31–0.39 in) long on male plants, and 6–7 mm (0.24–0.28 in) long on female plants.

=== Life cycle ===
Elodea densa typically displays little variation in growth patterns throughout the year when grown in tropical environments; however, when grown in more moderate environments the plant spends most of its energy on starch production and storage in the winter and canopy growth during the summer season.

== Taxonomy ==
Elodea densa was scientifically described by Jules Émile Planchon in 1849 and given the name Egeria densa, creating the genus Egeria. In 1857 Robert Caspary moved it to genus Elodea.

== Habitat and ecology ==
=== Location ===
Elodea densa is native to Argentina, Brazil, Uruguay, and Chile. As a result of its popularity in aquariums the plant has now spread to North America, Europe, Asia, Australia, New Zealand, and Africa.

=== Temperature ===
Temperature is important to the growth of Elodea densa; however, its growth is mostly stable in temperatures ranging from 16–28 °C (61–82 °F), with an upper temperature limit of 32 °C (90 °F) that results in reduced shoot growth and photosynthetic output. Colder temperatures will limit growth of the plant and can be used as a method of controlling its spread in non-native ecosystems.

=== Lighting ===
Elodea densa is able to match photosynthetic output to available light like many macrophyte species. The species' ability to thrive in low light conditions and its ability to form a dense canopy makes it a very successful invader compared with other macrophytes, resulting in a reduction in the diversity of plant species where it is introduced.

== Cultivation and uses ==
Elodea densa is a popular aquarium plant, but is no longer sold in some areas due to its invasive potential. Plants in cultivation are all a male clone, reproducing vegetatively.

It grows well in the cooler aquarium and is suitable for the beginner. It is easily propagated by cuttings. According to reports it secretes antibiotic substances which can help prevent blue-green algae. It grows best in a nutrient-rich, high light environment, but has shown an ability to outcompete other species when it is introduced.

=== Economics ===
E. densa, like other macrophytes, are effective when used in wastewater treatment plants due to the same factors that make it a potential invasive plant; mainly its ability to take up nutrients, and sedimentation of particles from the water column.

=== Invasive species ===
Elodea densa has escaped from cultivation and become naturalized and invasive in many warm temperate to subtropical regions of the world, including Abkhazia, South Africa, the Azores, Guangdong, Hawaii, the Society Islands, Venezuela, New Zealand, New Caledonia, and North America. In the United States it occurs from New York south to Florida and west to California and Oregon. In the Sacramento–San Joaquin Delta of California, it was introduced in the 1960s and has since had a significant adverse impact on the local ecosystem. The plant currently infests 2,400 ha (5,900 acres), or 12% of the total surface area of the delta, along with other states and even as far north as Canada. Recently, E. densa was reported as naturalized alien species in Iceland where it invaded the naturally heated water bodies. Due to its occurrence in northern Iceland, E. densa is one of the first freshwater alien plant species that reached the Arctic. Most of its impact occurs in the shallow waterways; the plant forms thick mats that obstruct boat passage, clog water intakes and aqueducts, trap sediments, crowd out native vegetation, and impede the migration of anadromous fish.

== Role as ecosystem engineer ==
Though it is sometimes debated, E. densa is referred to as an ecosystem engineer as a result of the impact it has on an environment once it is introduced. Some of these impacts are due to its fast growth and high dispersal rate when fragmented, its ability to adapt to different light and nutrient availability, its uptake of nutrients from the water column and its effect on sedimentation of these nutrients, and the large light-blocking canopy that its flowers form at the surface of the water.

Elodea densa is also responsible for changing the amount of phytoplankton present in the water column due to limiting light availability from the dense canopy that it forms, and from the amount of nutrients that removes from the water column. It can, however, also function as shelter for zooplankton and smaller invertebrates.

Black-necked swans feed on the plant, and decline of E. densa has been linked to the decline of swan populations.

== Control ==
A variety of methods are needed to ensure that growth of E. densa is stopped due to its ability to regrow when fragmented through mechanical means. The best way is to remove the plant in entirety from the water column or use herbicides to kill the plant. One of the potential solutions to the problem are water drawdowns, as the plant is very sensitive to drying out and the plant can die in as short as an hour when removed from water. In addition cold weather has been found to be effective in controlling the plant, though this has practical limitations. When herbicides were applied to the plant, the levels of phosphorus and nitrogen increased but not greatly, suggesting that most of the nutrients remained in the plant biomass and did not reabsorb into the water column.
