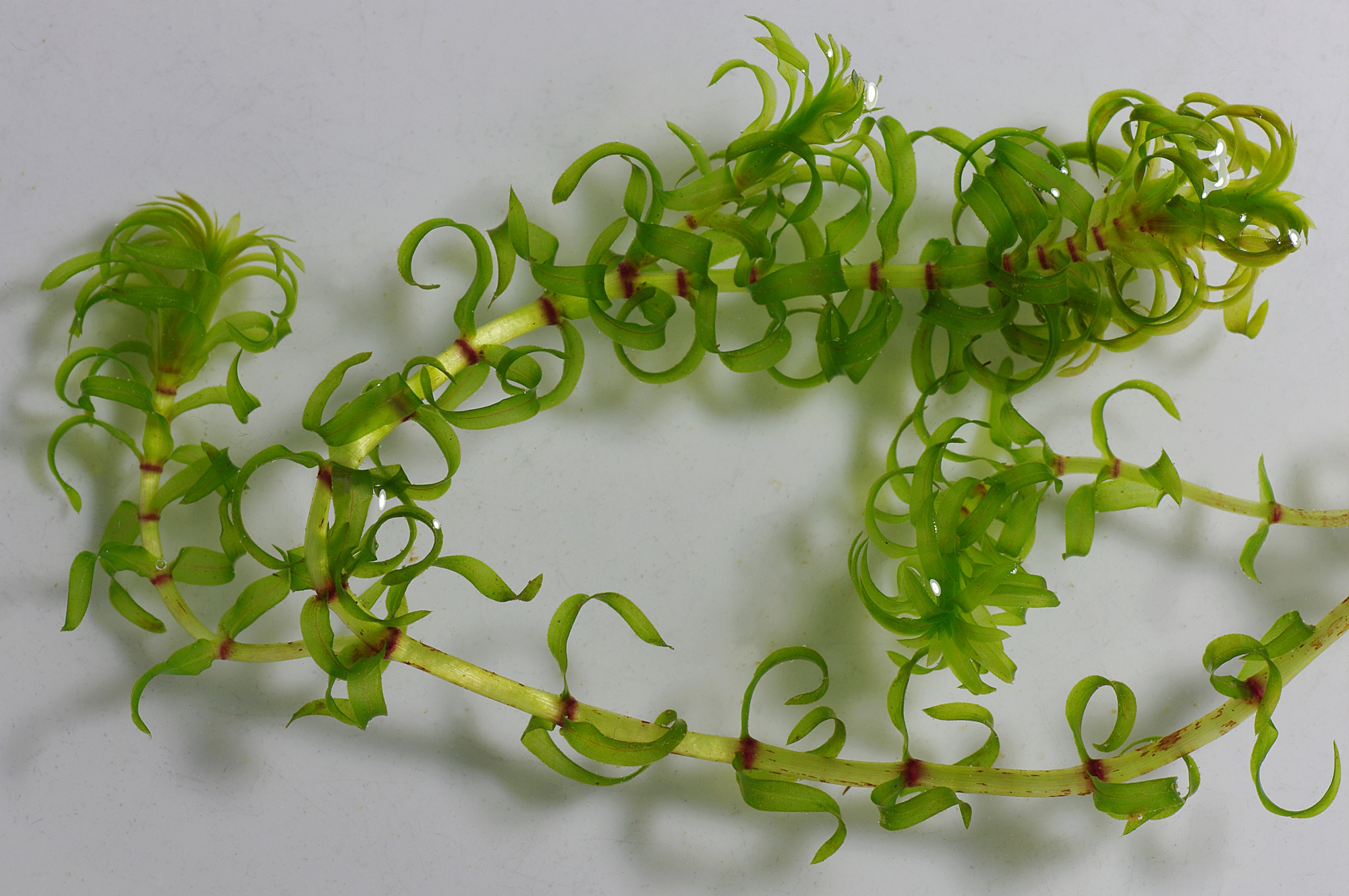

Conservation status
- Least Concern (IUCN 3.1)

Scientific classification
- Kingdom: Plantae
- Clade: Tracheophytes
- Clade: Angiosperms
- Clade: Monocots
- Order: Alismatales
- Family: Hydrocharitaceae
- Genus: Elodea
- Species: E. nuttallii

Binomial name
- Elodea nuttallii (Planch.) H.St.John

Synonyms
- List: Anacharis nuttallii Planch. (1849); Elodea columbiana H.St.John (1962); Elodea minor (Engelm. ex Casp.) Farw. (1915); Philotria minor (Engelm. ex Casp.) Small (1903); Philotria nuttallii (Planch.) Rydb. (1908); Udora verticillata var. minor Engelm. ex Casp. (1857)

= Elodea nuttallii =

North American species of aquatic plant

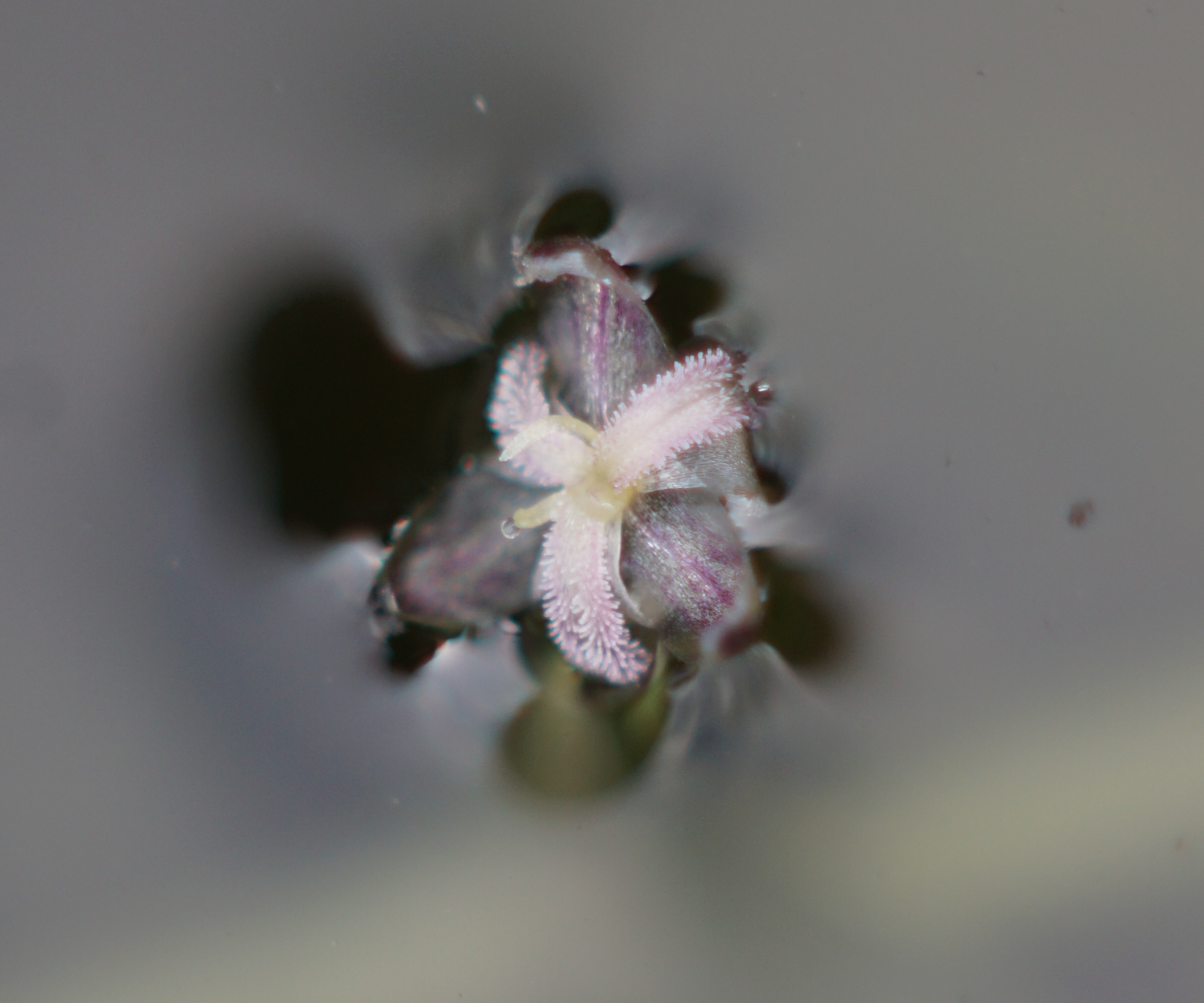
Female flower of Elodea nuttallii

Elodea nuttallii is a species of waterweed known by the common name western waterweed or Nuttall's waterweed. This is a perennial aquatic plant which is native to North America where it grows submersed in lakes, rivers, and other shallow water bodies. It is also found in Eurasia, where it is commonly weedy; it is not known as a weed species in its native range. It is sometimes used as an aquarium plant.

== Description ==
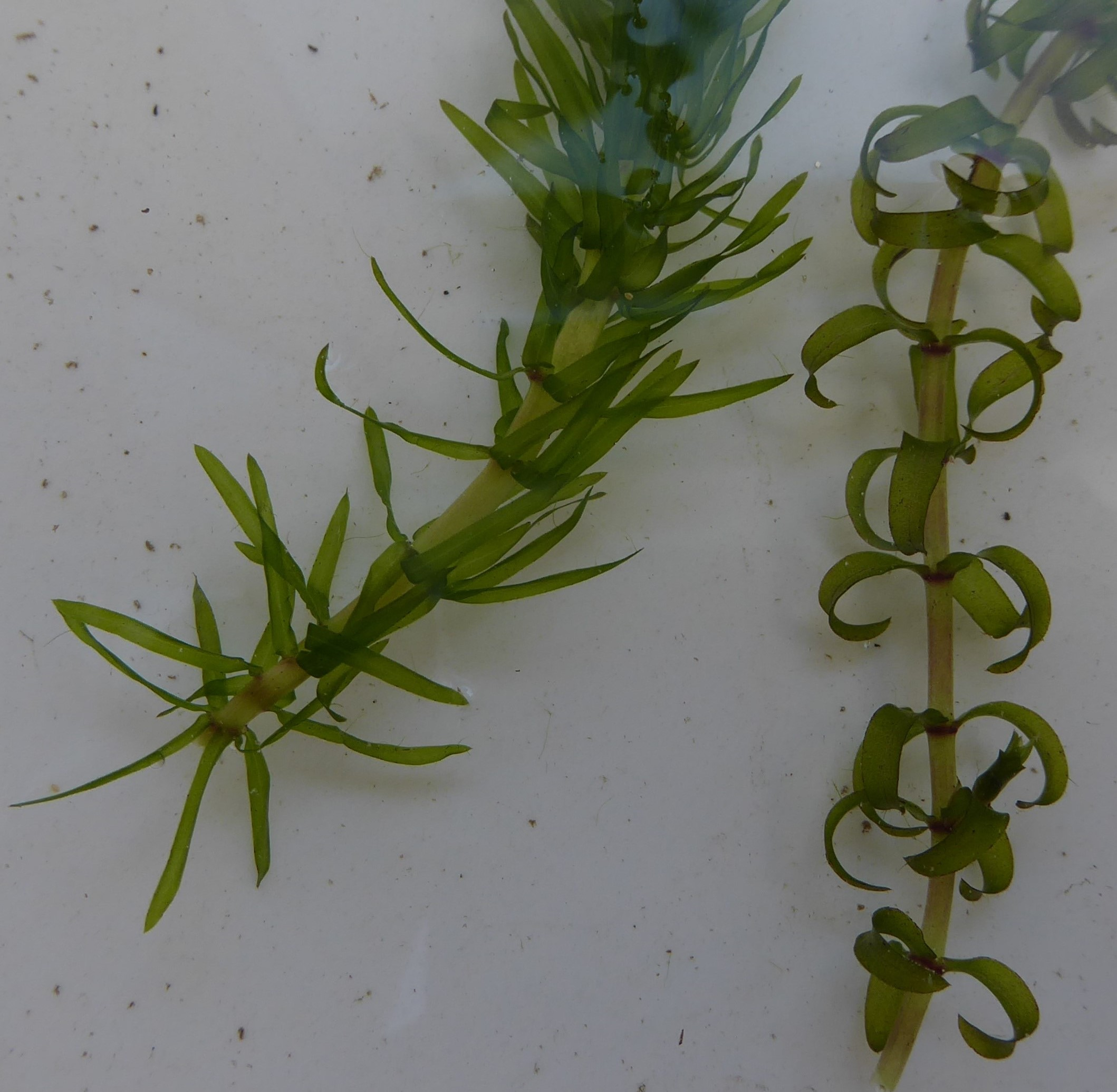
The leaves taper to a fine point.

It is similar to its relative E. canadensis except that the leaves taper to an acute point. It has a thin branching stem with whorls of 3–4 (exceptionally, 5) flat leaves at intervals. Some leaves are recurved and twisted, with minute teeth. It bears tiny flowers, the staminate ones abscissing from their stalks and floating away from the plant. It flowers from May until October. In Europe nearly all individuals are female, only some places with male plants are known.

== Distribution ==
This species is native to temperate North America. It has been naturalised in Europe since 1939 and in Japan since the 1960s. The first European record of Elodea nuttallii was probably 1914 in England, though it had been identified wrongly as Hydrilla verticillata, with correct identification as Elodea nuttallii occurring in 1974. It seems to have been originally naturalised in Oxfordshire in 1966, but has now spread to most of England, and many parts of lowland Wales and lowland Scotland. The first record in Ireland was in Lough Neagh in 1984, and it has now spread widely in the country. It is an invasive species in Europe; it reached Belgium in 1939, the Netherlands in 1941, Germany in 1953, Denmark in 1974, Sweden in 1991 and Norway in 2006. It is now present in most of Northern Europe, in many parts displacing the invasive Elodea canadensis. Due to the significant negative impacts of its introduction to the ecosystem, the European Union has included it in the list of invasive alien species of Union concern and hence it cannot be imported, bred, transported, commercialized, or intentionally released into the environment in any of its member states.
