= List of pests and diseases of roses =

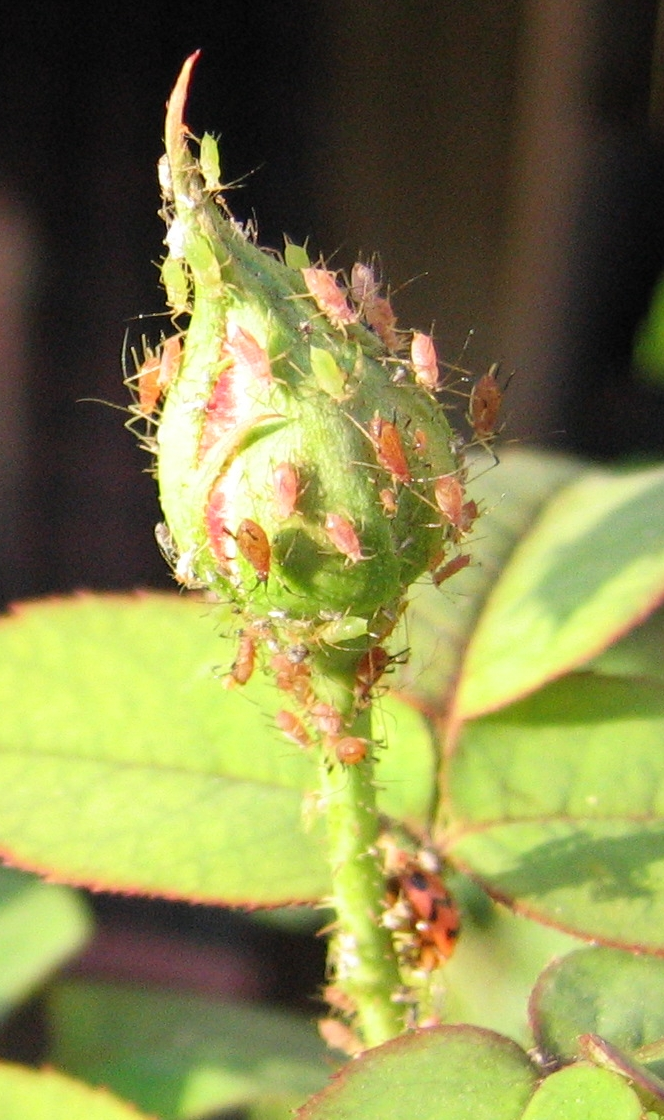
Rose aphid (Macrosiphum rosae) feeding on buds and shoots

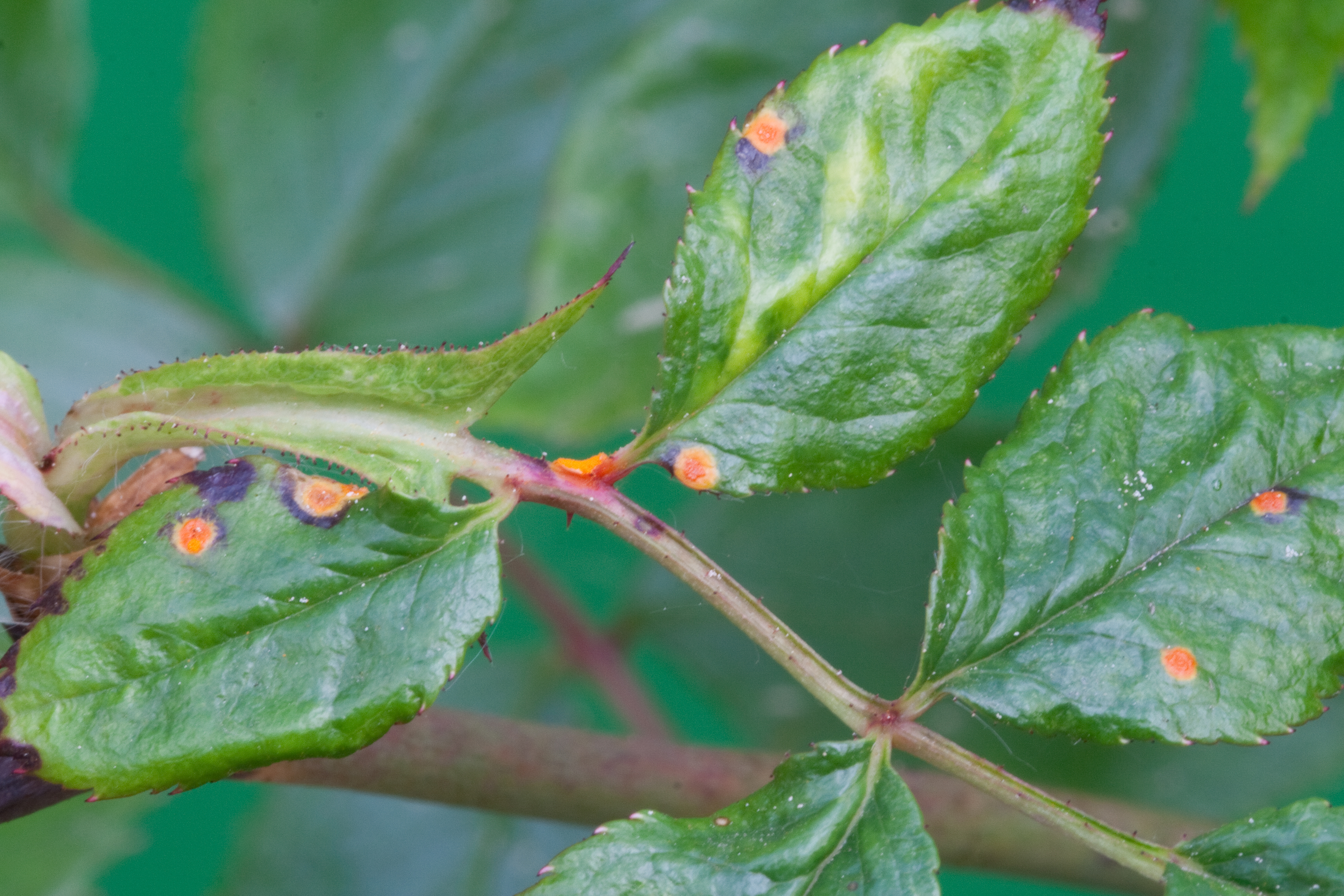
Rose rust (Phragmidium)

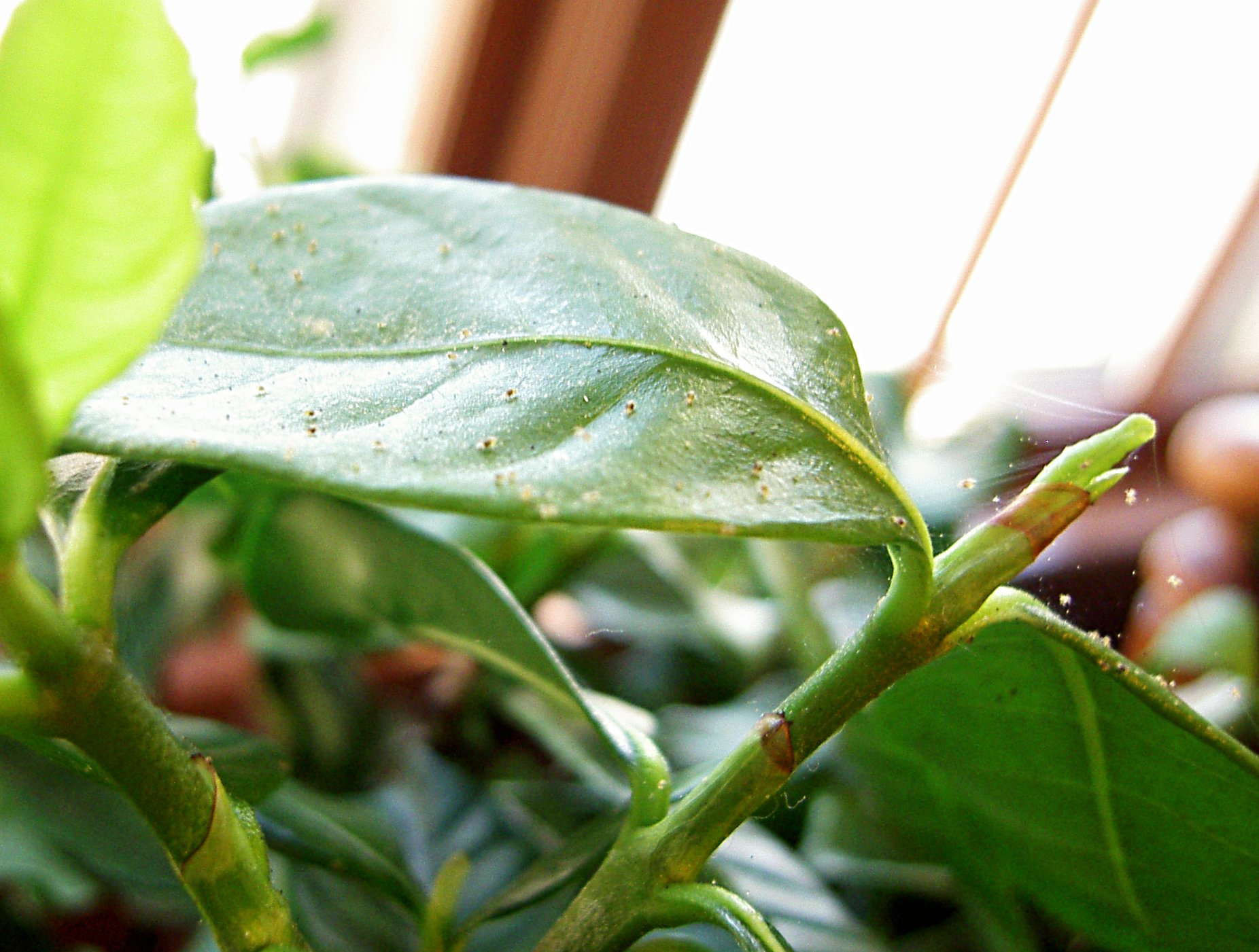
Two-spotted mite (Tetranychus urticae) on Gardenia

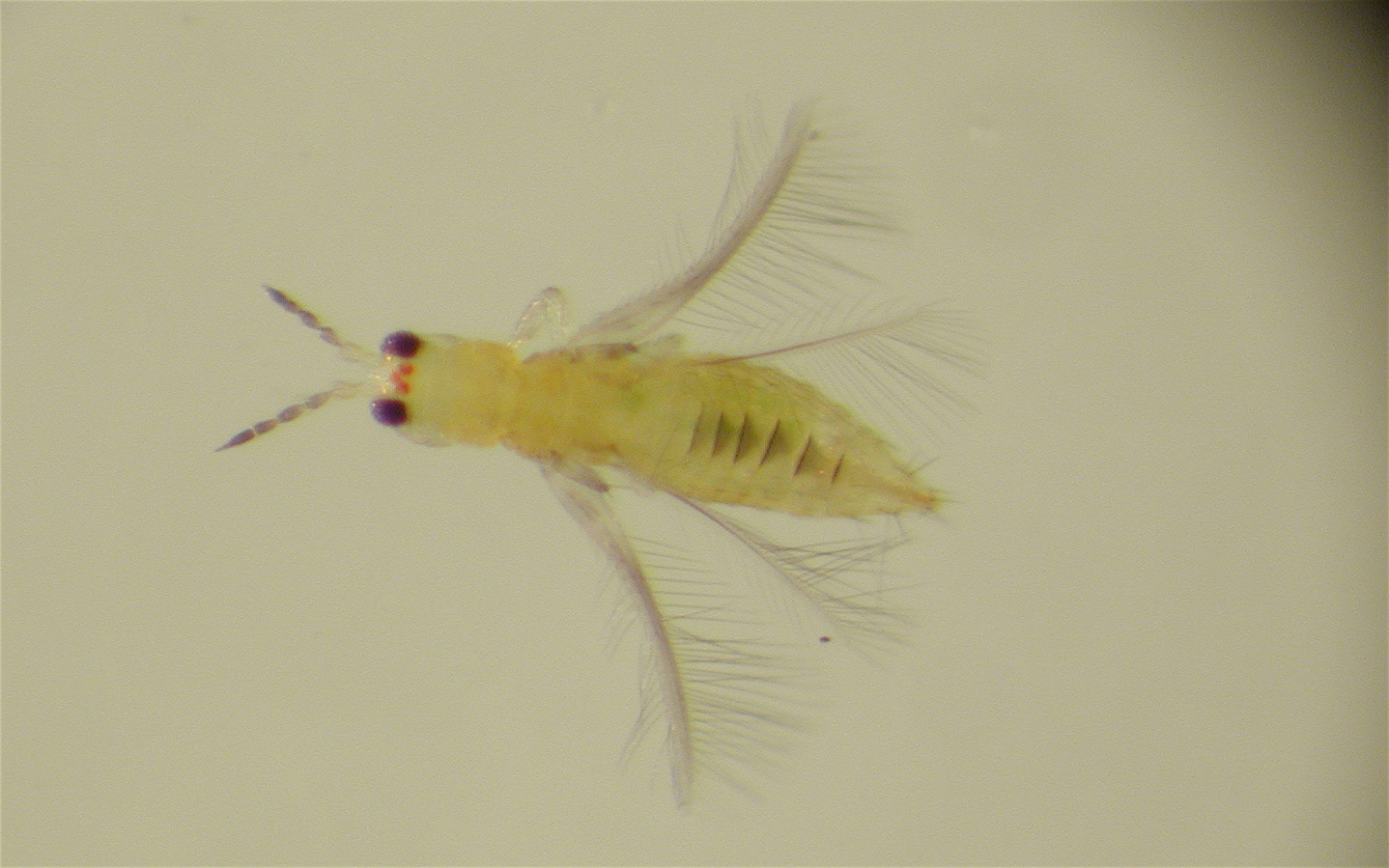
Yellow tea thrips (Scirtothrips dorsalis)

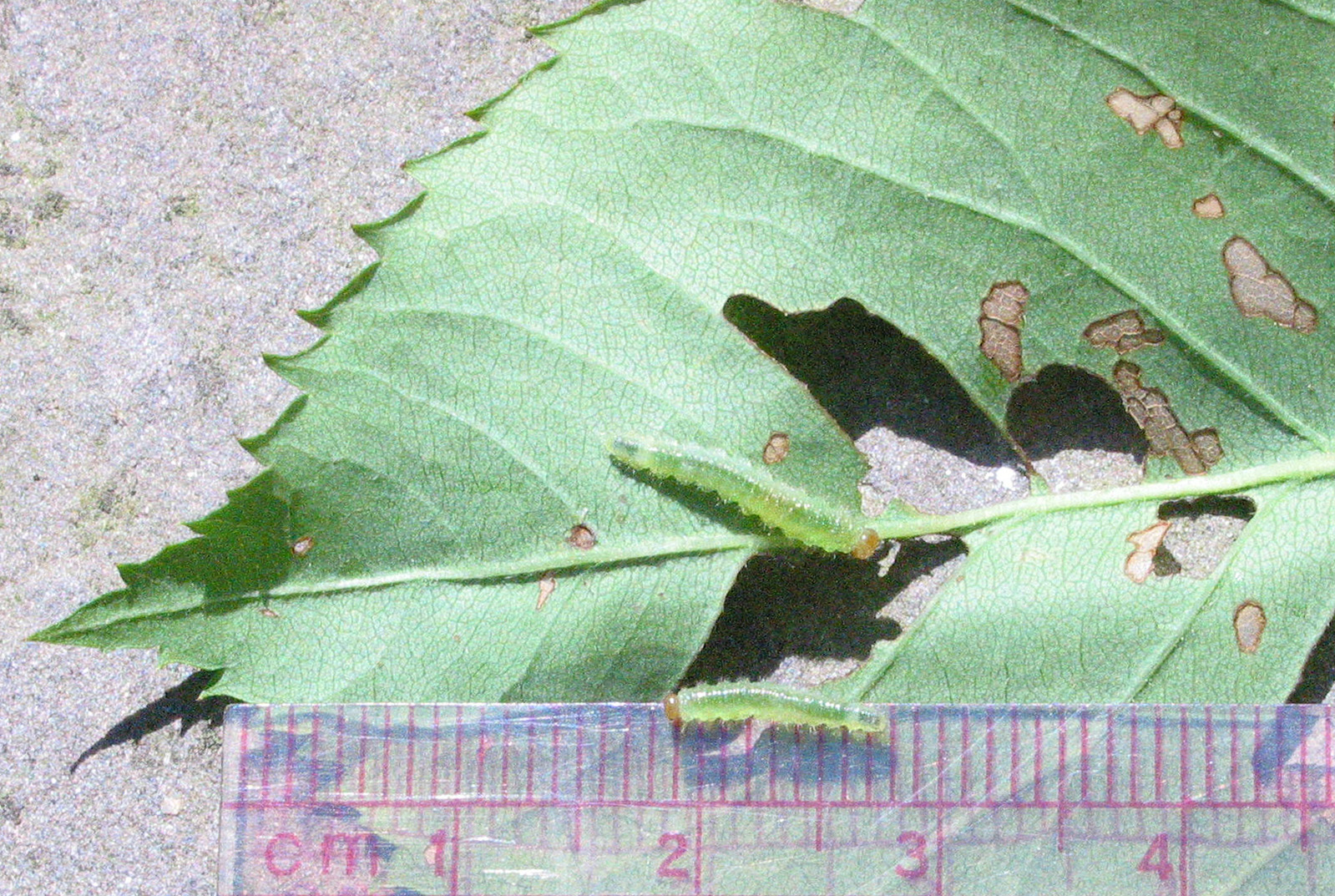
Bristly roseslug (Cladius difformis) on the underside of a leaf

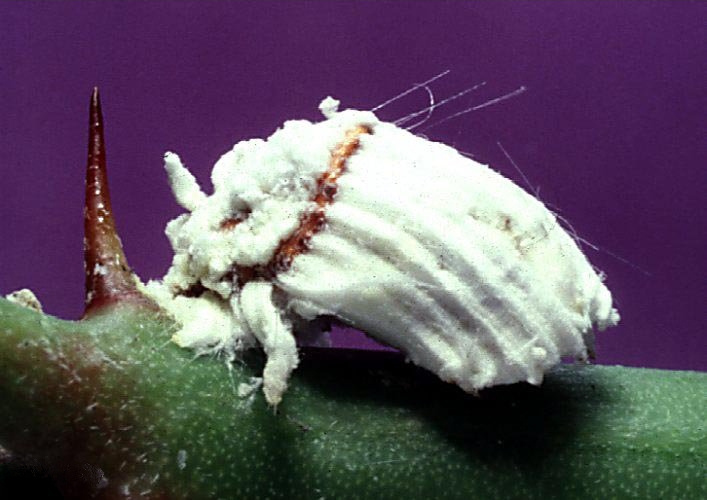
Cottony cushion scale (Icerya purchasi)

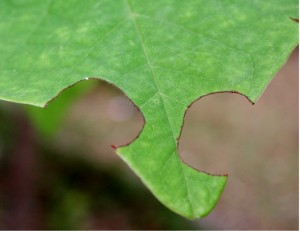
Leaf damage caused by a leafcutting bee (Megachile sp.)

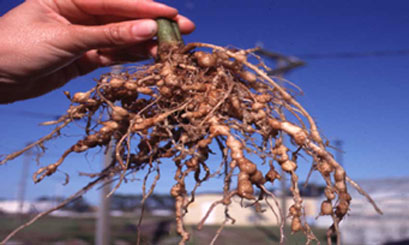
Root-knot nematode (Meloidogyne sp.) nodule damage to roots

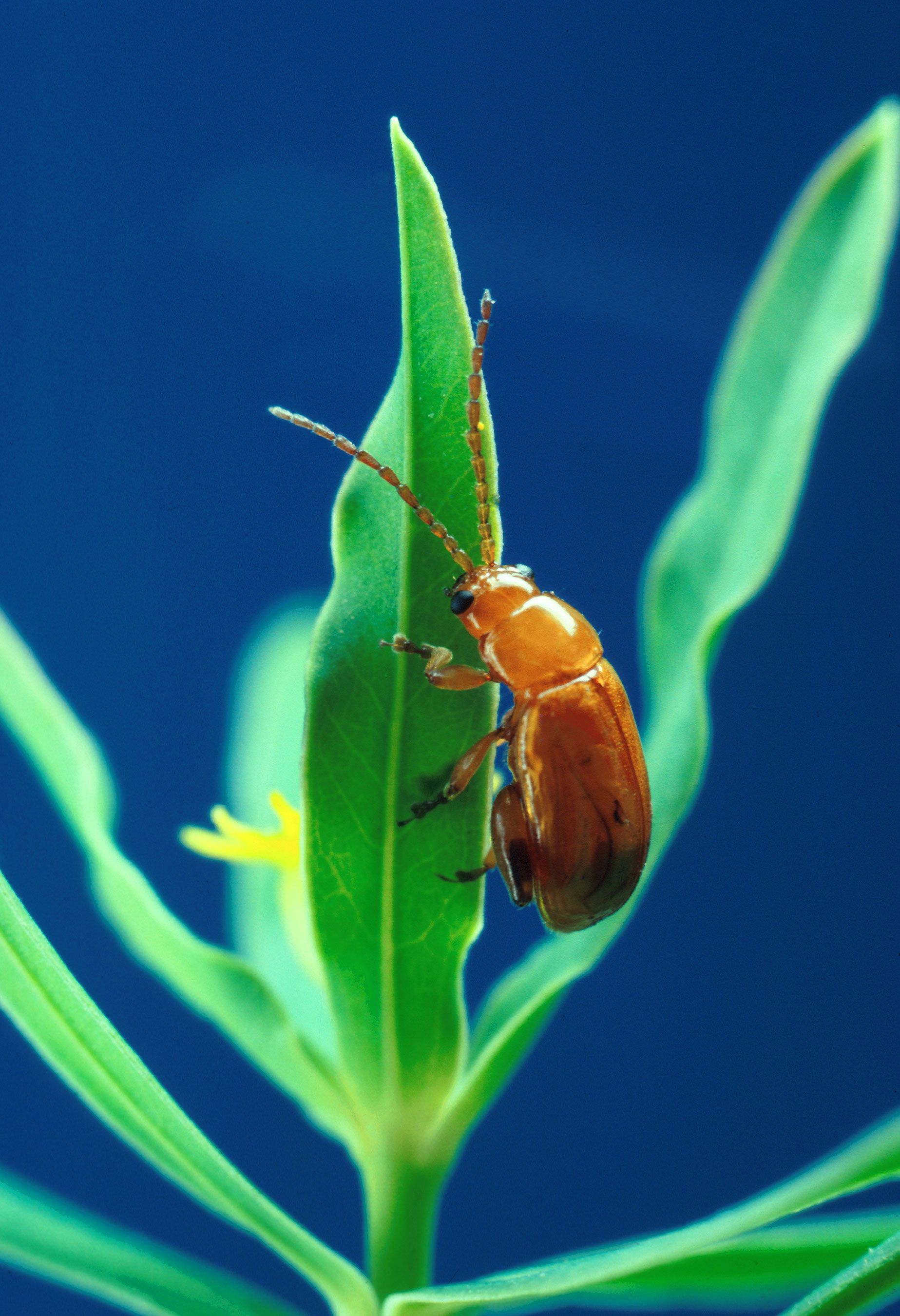
Flea beetle (Aphthona flava)

Roses (Rosa species) are susceptible to a number of pests, diseases and disorders. Many of the problems affecting roses are seasonal and climatic. Some varieties of roses are naturally more resistant or immune than others to certain pests and diseases. Cultivation requirements of individual rose species and cultivars, when observed, often assist in the prevention of pests, diseases and disorders.

== Pests ==
Insects that affect roses are often considered pests.

- Aphids (greenfly) (order Hemiptera family Aphididae) Macrosiphum rosae – Likely to be found on new shoots and buds, aphids are soft bodied insects 1–2 mm long. Often green but occasionally light brown, and sometimes with wings, they may cover (in a colony) the complete growing tip of the plant. Aphids are most active in spring and summer and multiply at a prodigious rate feeding on the sap of the plant by piercing the plant cells via a proboscis. In large quantities they may seriously retard the growth of the plant and ruin buds. They are particularly damaging to the new shoots with subsequent damage to the emerging leaves which become malformed with much the same appearance as leaf-curl in peaches.
- Two-spotted mite (spider-mites or red spider mite) (order Acari: family Tetranychidae) Tetranychus urticae – Previously known as red-spider mite these arachnids prefer the underside of leaves and are difficult to see with an unaided eye. Evidence of their presence is silvering of leaves where the mites have destroyed individual leaf cells. Fine webbing and eggs on the undersides of leaves is further evidence of the presence of Tetranychus urticae.
- Thrips (order Thysanoptera) – Thrips are slim-winged insects 1 mm in length, resembling fine slivers of wood or rice. Preferring light-coloured blooms and often appearing in plague numbers, flowers are often left looking scarred, warped, and lustreless.
- Rose slugs (rose sawflies) – Sawflies are non-stinging wasps (Hymenoptera) in the suborder Symphyta, not flies (Diptera). They lay eggs in plant leaves or stems with a saw-like ovipositor. There are three species that commonly cause damage to wild or cultivated roses: The bristly roseslug (Cladius difformis) is found in Europe, Siberia, and many areas of North America. The larva is pale green, up to 16 millimetres (0.6 in) long, and covered with hairlike bristles all over its body. It looks like a caterpillar but that term, strictly speaking, only applies to the larvae of moths and butterflies. It skeletonises the underside of leaves, with several generations per year. The European roseslug (Endelomyia aethiops) is found in North America and Europe. The larvae are more slug like (but not slimy), up to 13 millimetres (0.5 in), and skeletonises the upper surface of leaves with only one generation per year. The curled roseslug (Allantus cinctus) larva is pastel green on the back, marked on the thorax and abdomen with white dots, and up to 19 millimetres (0.7 in) long. It frequently coils up like a snake. After skeletonising entire leaves except the main veins, it pupates in the pith of canes, with up to two generations per year in North America.
- Caterpillars (order Lepidoptera) (See also List of Lepidoptera that feed on roses) – The (tortrix) moth Lozotaenia forsterana is a prominent pest of roses. The caterpillars are green, up to 15 mm long, and can be found boring into buds or within curled leaves. When disturbed the caterpillars move swiftly, dropping to the ground on a fine thread. Damage is chewn leaves and flowers and buds with "shot holes".
- Curculio beetles (family Curculionidae)
- Japanese beetles (Popillia japonica) – This species, introduced to North America in 1912, is now an endemic pest in the eastern United States. Adult beetles emerge from the ground in early summer and join into swarms for four to six weeks, devouring blooms and skeletonising foliage on roses and many other garden plants. Japanese beetles can be partially controlled, albeit slowly, by spreading milky spore bacillus on the lawn areas where the larvae live. The popular pheromone-baited traps may do more harm than good by attracting beetles from a wide area.
- Scale insects (order Hemiptera)

Cottony cushion scale (order Hemiptera: family Coccoidea) Icerya purchasi – This scale infests twigs and branches. The mature female is oval in shape, reddish brown with black hairs, 5 mm long. When mature the insect remains stationary and produces an egg sac in grooves, by extrusion, in the body which encases hundreds of red eggs. The insect causes little damage but produces copious honeydew (frass) that can cause damaging sooty mould.
California red scale (order Hemiptera: family Coccoidea) Aonidiella aurantii – A hard scale, orange to orange pink, the female covering being less than 1.5 mm across. Often in plague numbers this scale infests upper surfaces of foliage causing yellowing, leaf fall, and twig and branch dieback. Serious infestations can cause plant death.
Rose scale (order Hemiptera: family Coccoidea) Aulacaspis rosae – Mainly found on the stems and branches of the plant, lack of control will allow the pest to spread to flower stalks and petioles. At this point the plant would be stunted, spindly and with a white, flaky crust of scales on the bark. Female Aulacaspis rosae may live for one year and may lay 80 eggs each with several overlapping generations living within millimetres of the original parent.

- Leaf cutting bee (order Hymenoptera: family Megachilidae) Megachile species – Leafcutter bees are 6–16 mm long and mostly black with bands of light-coloured hair. They chew pieces from the edges of leaves. The pieces are regular in shape, circular or oval. Damage is not often significant.
- Nematodes (eelworms) (order Tylenchida: family Heteroderidae)

Root-knot nematode Meloidogyne species – symptoms of Meloidogyne infestation in roses is stunting, slow growth, pale green leaves and wilting in mild weather.

- Rose chafer (order Coleoptera: family Scarabaeidae) Macrodactylus subspinosus – The rose chafer is common to North America, and emerges in late May to mid June. These beetles form aggregations and feed upon foliage, buds, flowers, and fruit of roses and other ornamentals.
- Metallic flea-beetles (order Coleoptera: family Chrysomelidae) Altica species – The small, shiny and metallic Altica beetles have thickened hindlegs adapted to jumping, similar to fleas. The insects are 3 mm long and chew holes of irregular shapes in young leaves and buds. As the leaves enlarge so do the holes.

== Diseases ==
=== Bacterial diseases ===
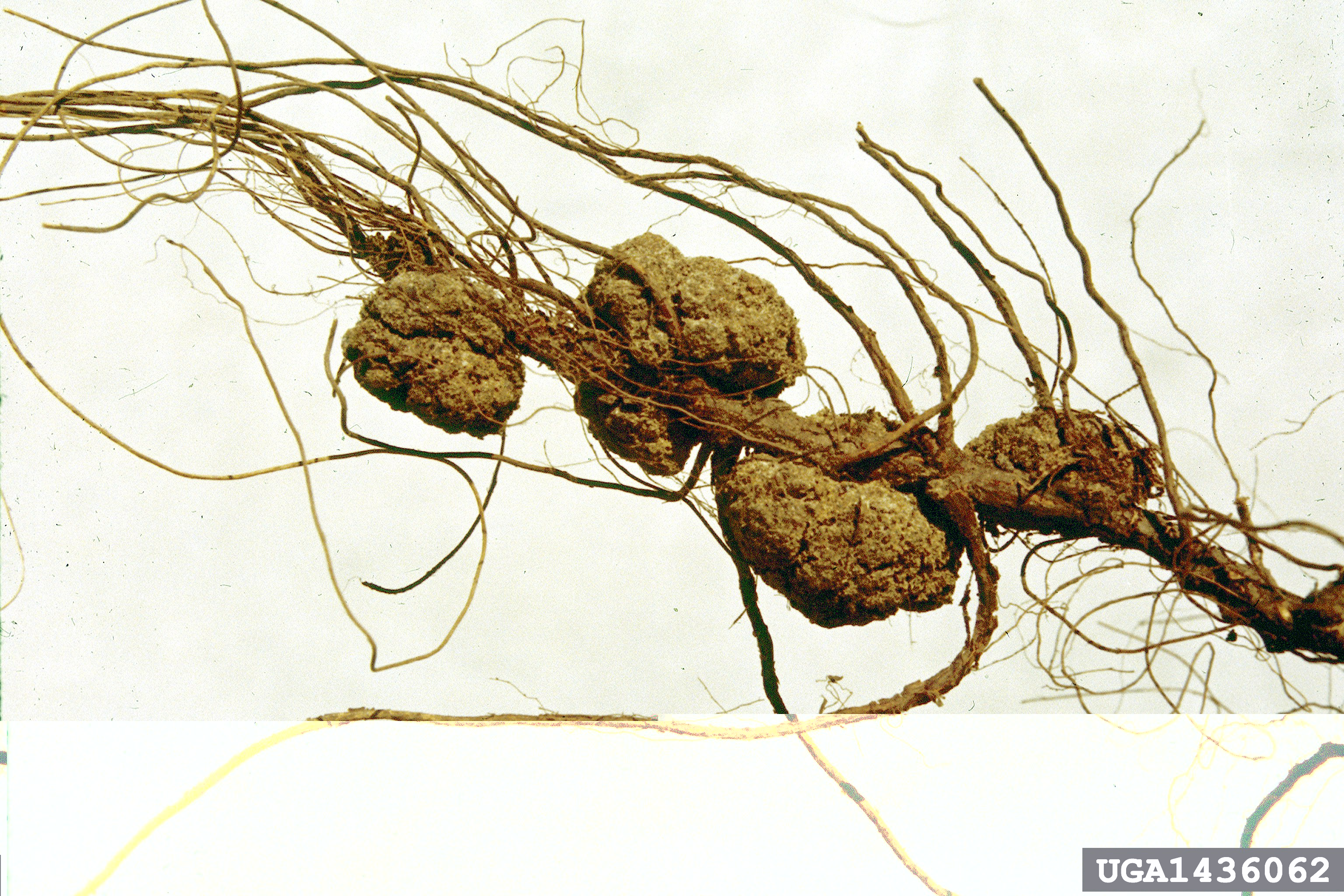
Crown gall rot (Agrobacterium rhizogenes)

- Crown gall rot (class Alphaproteobacteria: family Rhizobiaceae) Agrobacterium rhizogenes – This disease is characterised by large lumps at the base of the plant stem or on roots. Galls may appear higher on stems as the disease progresses. Galls are soft compared to surrounding plant tissues. The pathogenic bacteria enter the plant via a wound. If the disease affects the plant whilst it is young the plant may be affected to the degree where it will not produce blooms. All affected plants wilt readily and grow poorly.

Bacterial diseases
Disease	Bacteria
Bacterial leaf spot or blast	Pseudomonas syringae pv. mors-prunorum
Crown gall	Agrobacterium tumefaciens
Hairy root	Agrobacterium rhizogenes

=== Fungal diseases ===
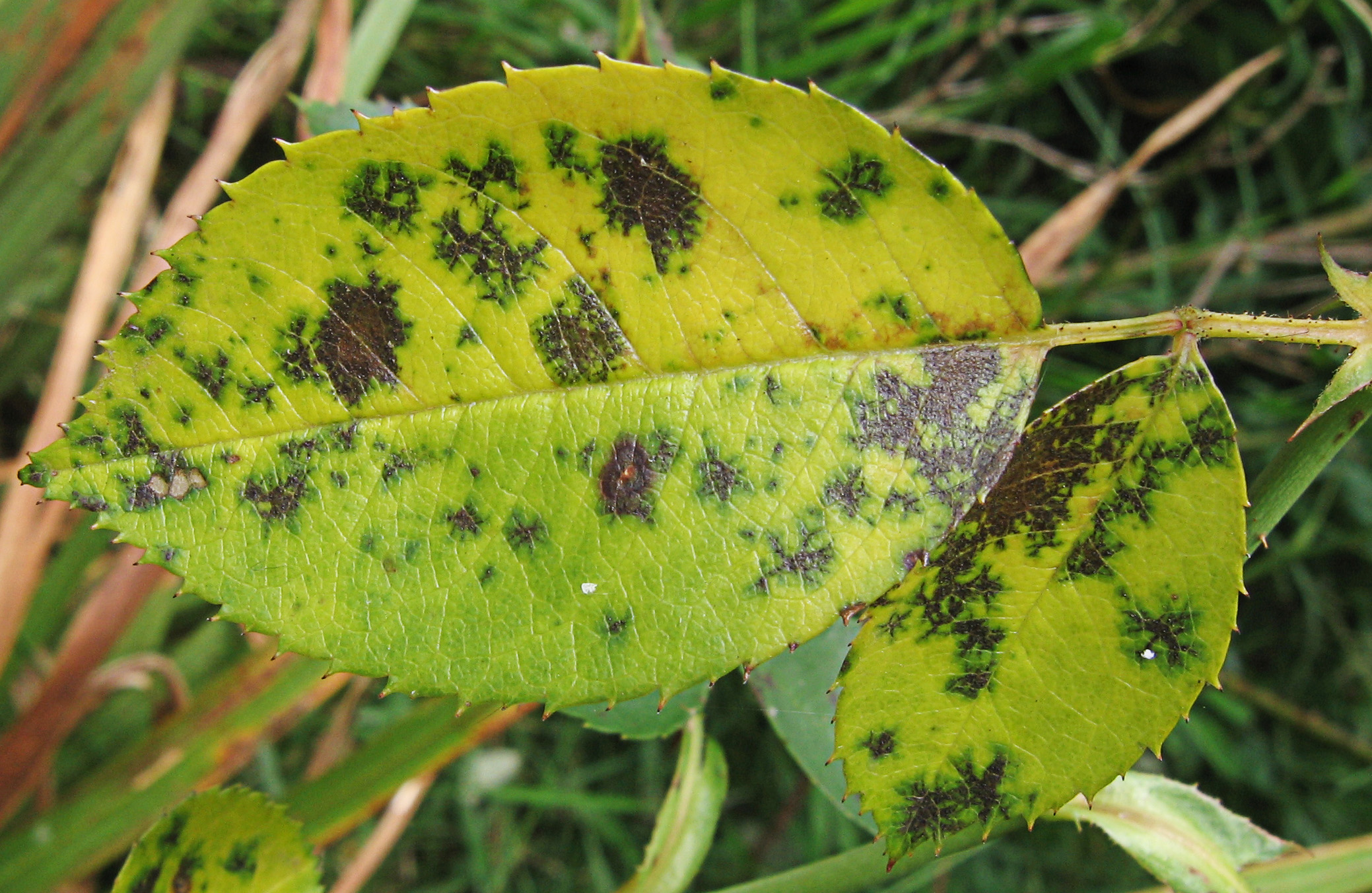
Black spot (Diplocarpon rosae)

- Black spot (class Leotiomycetes: family Helotiales) Diplocarpon rosae syn. Marssonina rosae – Marssonina rosae causes black spots on leaves. The spots, which may be as much as 12 mm across, are generally circular and have an irregular edge often with a yellow halo. Leaves frequently turn yellow and fall early. Sometimes new leaves are produced, and these may also become affected. Continual defoliation will cause weakness, dieback or death of the plant. Some very susceptible species may have stems affected with a considerable reduction in plant vigour.

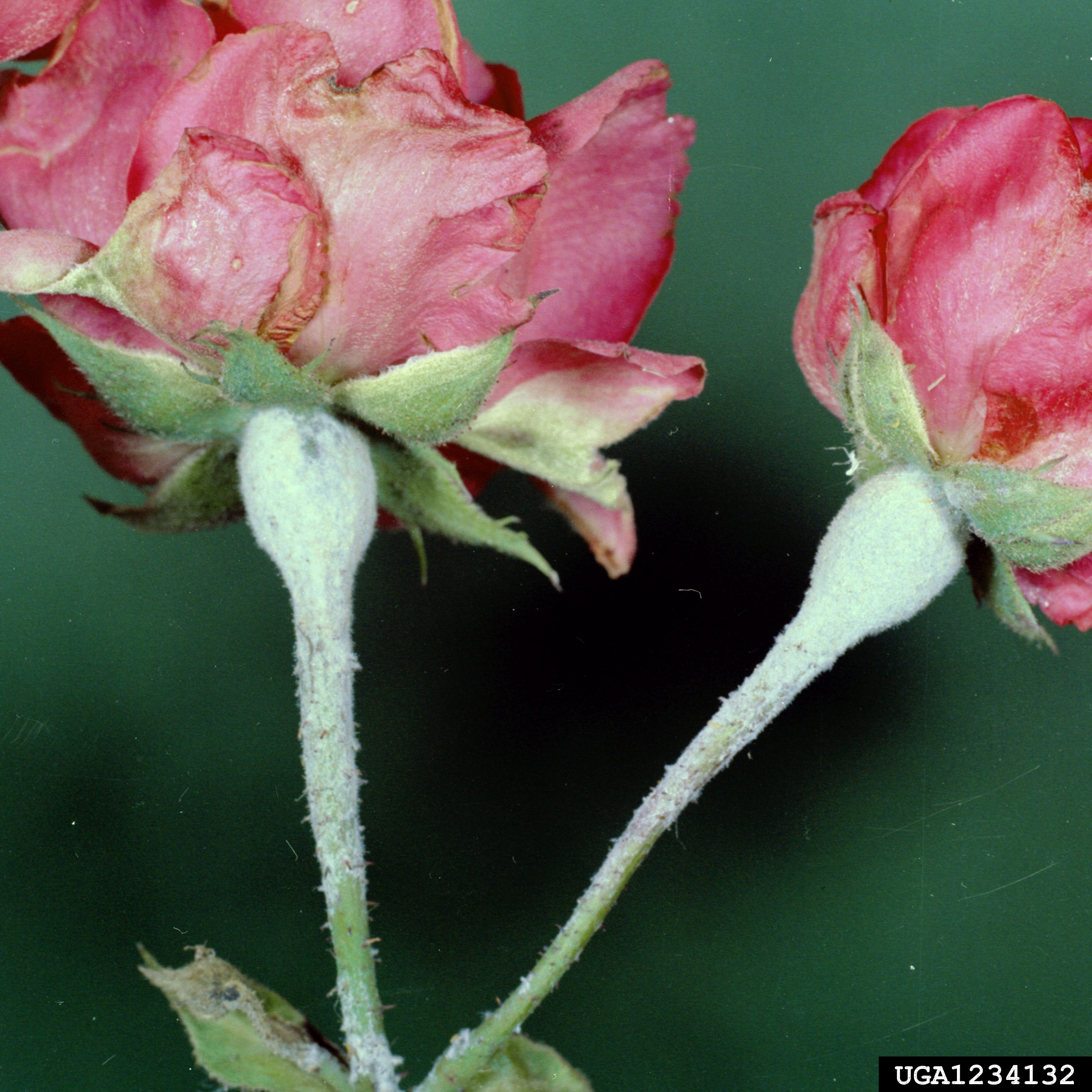
Powdery mildew (Podosphaera pannosa)

- Powdery mildew (Podosphaera pannosa) – P. pannosa produces a very fine, powdery coating on the surface of buds and leaves. Significant cases have stems and particularly thorns, infected. Attacks on young leaves and buds will cause deformity with retardation of growth. Infected buds will fail to open. The disease is likely in hot, humid weather, with fungal spores overwintering on the stems and fallen leaves.
- Downy mildew (class Oomycetes: family Peronosporaceae) Peronospora sparsa – Peronospora causes purple-red to dark-brown spots with irregular margins on the leaves, however, often angular. Stems, petioles and flower stalks can split and spotted with purple marks. Buds, sepals, petals and calyces can be affected and will present purple spots. New growth affected will be deformed. The disease is spread by wind.

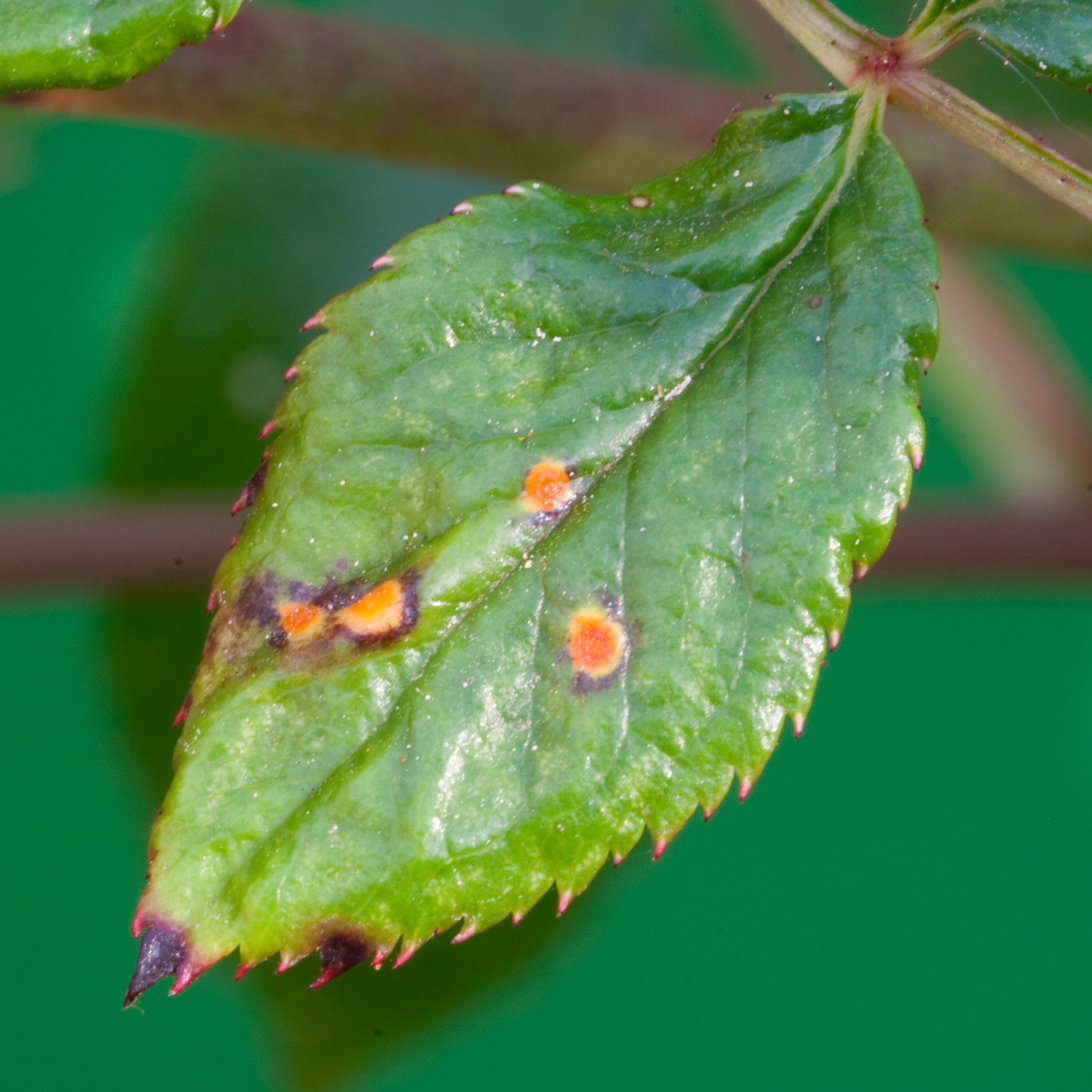
Rose rust

- Rust Phragmidium mucronatum – Rose rust appears as yellow patches on the surface of leaves, with orange pustules of spores underneath the leaf. The fungus is spread by wind. Affected leaves fall prior to healthy ones and plants may be defoliated in serious infections.

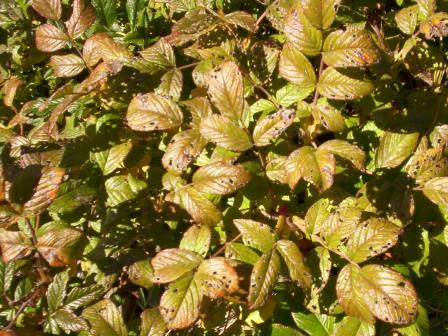
Anthracnose Sphaceloma rosarum on Rosa rugosa

- Anthracnose Sphaceloma rosarum – Spots caused by this fungus originate from a point where leaves are water soaked, usually unnoticeable at first, until they turn black with a very distinct defined edge. As the spots enlarge the centre becomes grey and may fall out resulting in a shot-hole appearance. Defoliation may occur but is often not serious.
- Grey mould (class Leotiomycetes: family Sclerotiniceae) Botrytis cinerea – On roses grey mould is primarily a disease of the flowers and buds, leaves are infrequently attacked. Infected buds rot on the stem and infection may progress down the stem. On petals Botrytis cinerea produces pink rings.
- Verticillium wilt (class incertae sedis: family Verticillium) Verticillium dahliae
- Sooty moulds Alternaria species – Sooty mould appears as black, dry powder on leaves similar to chimney soot. Many sooty moulds grow on the honeydew (frass) produced by sap-sucking insect such as aphids and soft scales. Alternaria does no direct damage to plants but surface cover of leaves will reduce the plants capacity to photosynthesise and may create an unsatisfactory plant appearance.
- Canker Leptosphaeria coniothyrium and Cryptosporella umbrina – Cankers present as small yellowish or reddish spots on bark slowly increasing in size. Leptosphaeria coniothyrium turns brown, increases in size, and may eventually girdle the stem. The tissue within the infection begins to dry out and shrink, presenting a shrivelled appearance. If the disease infects only part of the stem, growth above the canker will continue. If it girdles the stem, however, growth will cease and the stem will die.

Fungal diseases
Disease	Fungus	Synonyms
Alternaria leaf spot	Alternaria alternata Alternaria brassicae Alternaria brassicicola	
Black mold	Ceratocystis paradoxa	Chalara thielavioides Chalaropsis thielavioides
Black spot	Diplocarpon rosae Marssonina rosae [anamorph] ||	
Botrytis blight (bud, twig, and flower; also cane canker)	Botrytis cinerea Botryotinia fuckeliana [teleomorph] ||	
Brand canker	Coniothyrium wernsdorffiae ||	
Brown canker	Cryptosporella umbrina	Diaporthe umbrina
Cane blight canker	Botryosphaeria dothidea Fusicoccum aesculi [anamorph] Botryosphaeria ribis Fusicoccum sp. [anamorph] Discostroma corticola Seimatosporium lichenicola [anamorph] ||	
Cercospora leaf spot	Pseudocercospora puderi Cercospora puderii Cercospora rosicola Mycosphaerella rosicola [teleomorph] ||	
Common stem canker	Diapleella coniothyrium Coniothyrium fuckelii [anamorph] ||	
Crown canker	Cylindrocladium scoparium Calonectria kyotensis [teleomorph] ||	
Downy mildew	Peronospora sparsa ||	
Fungal canker	Cryptosporium minimum Nectria cinnabarina Tubercularia vulgaris [anamorph] Diaporthe eres Phomopsis oblonga [anamorph] Diplodia sp. ||	
Graft canker	Coniothyrium rosarum ||	
Powdery mildew	Podosphaera pannosa ||	
Rust	Phragmidium mucronatum Phragmidium rosae-pimpinellifoliae plus seven other Phragmidium spp. ||	
Septoria leaf spot	Septoria rosae Sphaerulina rehmiana [teleomorph] ||	
Spot anthracnose	Elsinoë rosarum Sphaceloma rosarum [anamorph] ||	
Verticillium wilt	Verticillium albo-atrum Verticillium dahliae ||	

=== Nematodes, parasitic ===
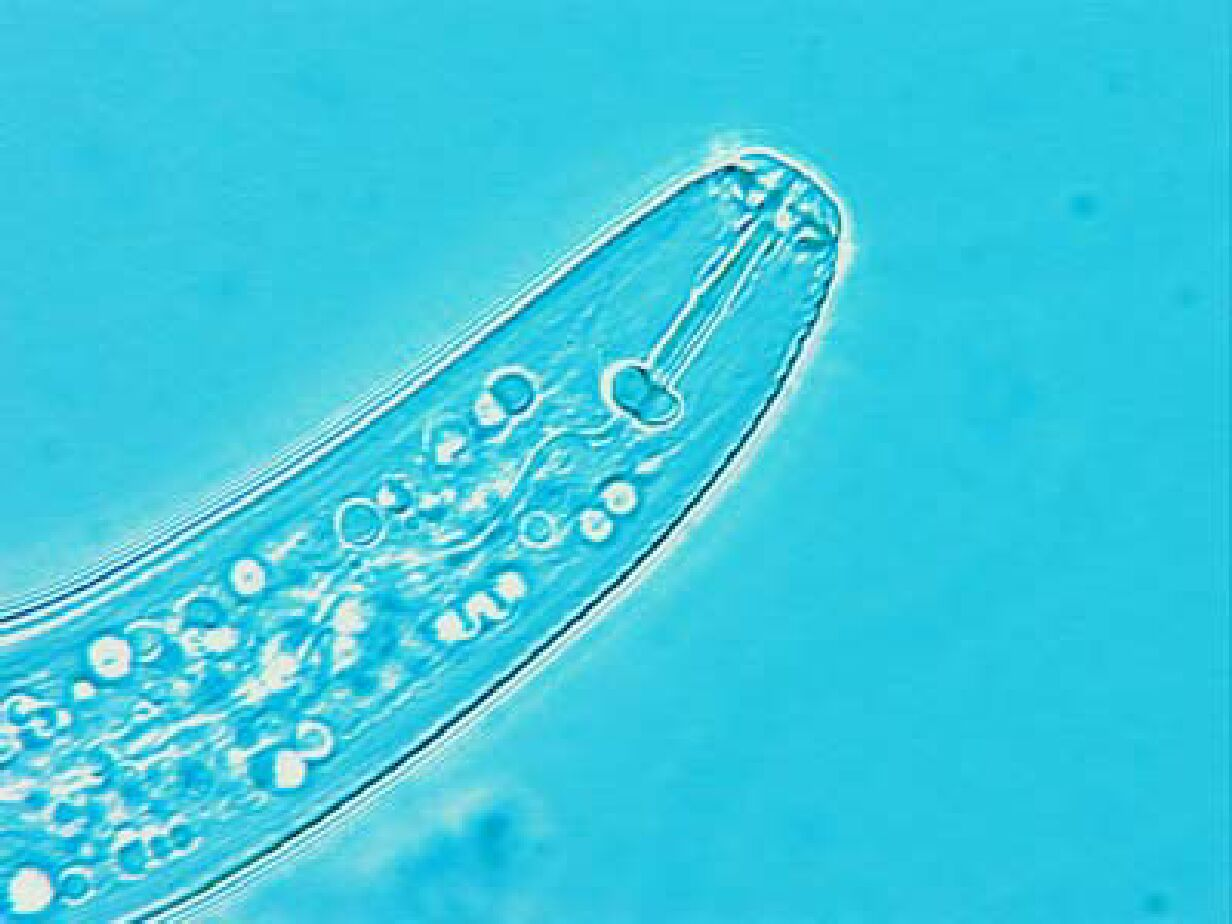
Pratylenchus penetrans, the most important pest nematode in the northeastern United States

Plant-parasitic nematodes include several genera and can be detrimental to plants – from attacking plants, acting as vectors spreading plant viruses to endoparasites.

Nematodes, parasitic
Disease	Nematodes
Dagger	Xiphinema spp. Xiphinema diversicaudatum
Lesion	Pratylenchus penetrans Pratylenchus vulnus
Ring	Criconemella axesta
Root-knot	Meloidogyne hapla
Spiral	Helicotylenchus nannus Rotylenchus spp.
Stunt	Tylenchorhynchus spp.

=== Phytoplasma, viruses, and virus-like diseases ===
(And graft-transmissible pathogens [GTP])

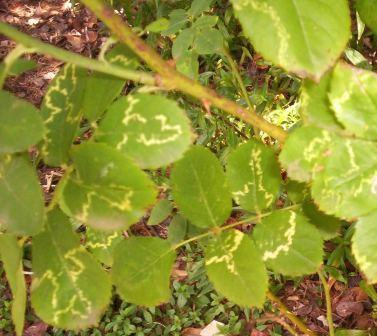
Rose mosaic virus on R. "Queen Elizabeth"

- Rose mosaic – This mosaic virus disease is caused by a complex of viruses and is characterized by yellow patterns on the leaves. The patterns vary considerably, ranging between all-over fine blotches to patterns of lines in waves. The patterns may appear on a few or many leaves. Plants are infected by this virus at propagation using infected plant material.
- Rose wilt – Rose wilt is a complex of viruses and is referred to as "dieback" in some areas. The disease can be spread by vectors such as aphids. Symptoms are variable and range from stunted growth to curled young leaves. The soft tissue symptoms are more evident in spring and new leaves will reflex towards their own petioles. The affected leaves are brittle and easily fall from the plant. Fully formed leaves will appear to wilt as if the plant were water stressed.
- Rose rosette disease – This disease is caused by a relatively recently described virus, Rose rosette emaravirus, that is transmitted by an eriophyid, rose leaf curl mite (Phyllocoptes fructiphilus), which inhabits the shoot tips and leaf petal bases of roses, as well as by grafting but not by seed or many other common vectors. Rose rosette was initially mistaken for a phytoplasma disease; however, heat and tetracycline treatments did not cure the disease showing that a phytoplasma is not the causal agent. Also called witches' broom of roses, it is fatal (average lifespan after infection 22 months) in the shrub Rosa multiflora, commonly found wild or as hedges (and introduced to North America, where it is considered an invasive species in some places). It can also infect other rose species, such as garden rose climbers, miniatures, hybrid teas, floribundas, and antique varieties and is capable of killing these as well. Roses are the only plants known to be susceptible. Symptoms include mosaic pattern on the leaves, malformed leaves and flowers, elongated shoots that are often red, and sometimes thorn proliferation. The distorted growth may be mistaken for herbicide damage. There is no treatment for the disease, and control is limited to controlling the vector and destroying infected plants. It is reported that the causal agent does not survive in the soil, but can survive in root fragments (See also Phyllody.). Breeding efforts from Texas A&M University Rose Breeding and Genetics Program has made efforts to find resistance in commercial cultivars. Further efforts has identified Rose rosette emaravirus resistance in both diploid and tetraploid levels.

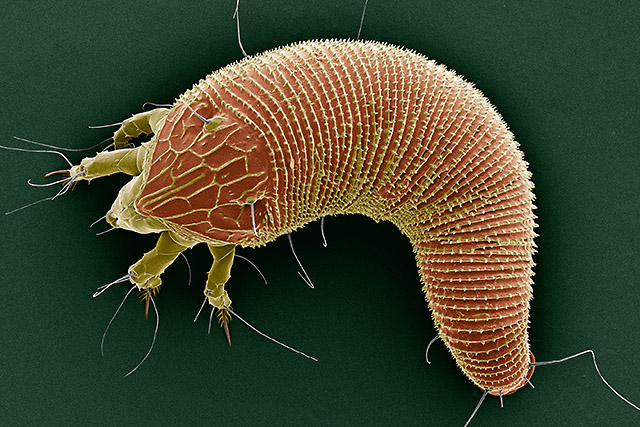
Electromicrograph of Phyllocoptes fructiphilus, the vector of Rose rosette emaravirus

Virus and viruslike diseases
Disease	Pathogen
Rose flower break	Undetermined [GTP]
Rose leaf curl	Virus suspected
Rose mosaic	May be caused by any of the following, alone or in combination: Ilarviruses (usually Prunus necrotic ringspot virus (PNRSV) and Apple mosaic virus (ApMV)) and Nepoviruses: Arabis mosaic virus (ArMV) and Strawberry latent ringspot virus (SLRV; nematode transmitted)
Rose ring pattern	Virus suspected [GTP]
Rose rosette	Rose rosette emaravirus, mite transmitted
Rose streak	Rose streak virus (RSV) [GTP]
Wild rose leaf rosette disease	Rose leaf rosette-associated virus (RLRaV)

== Environmental disorders ==
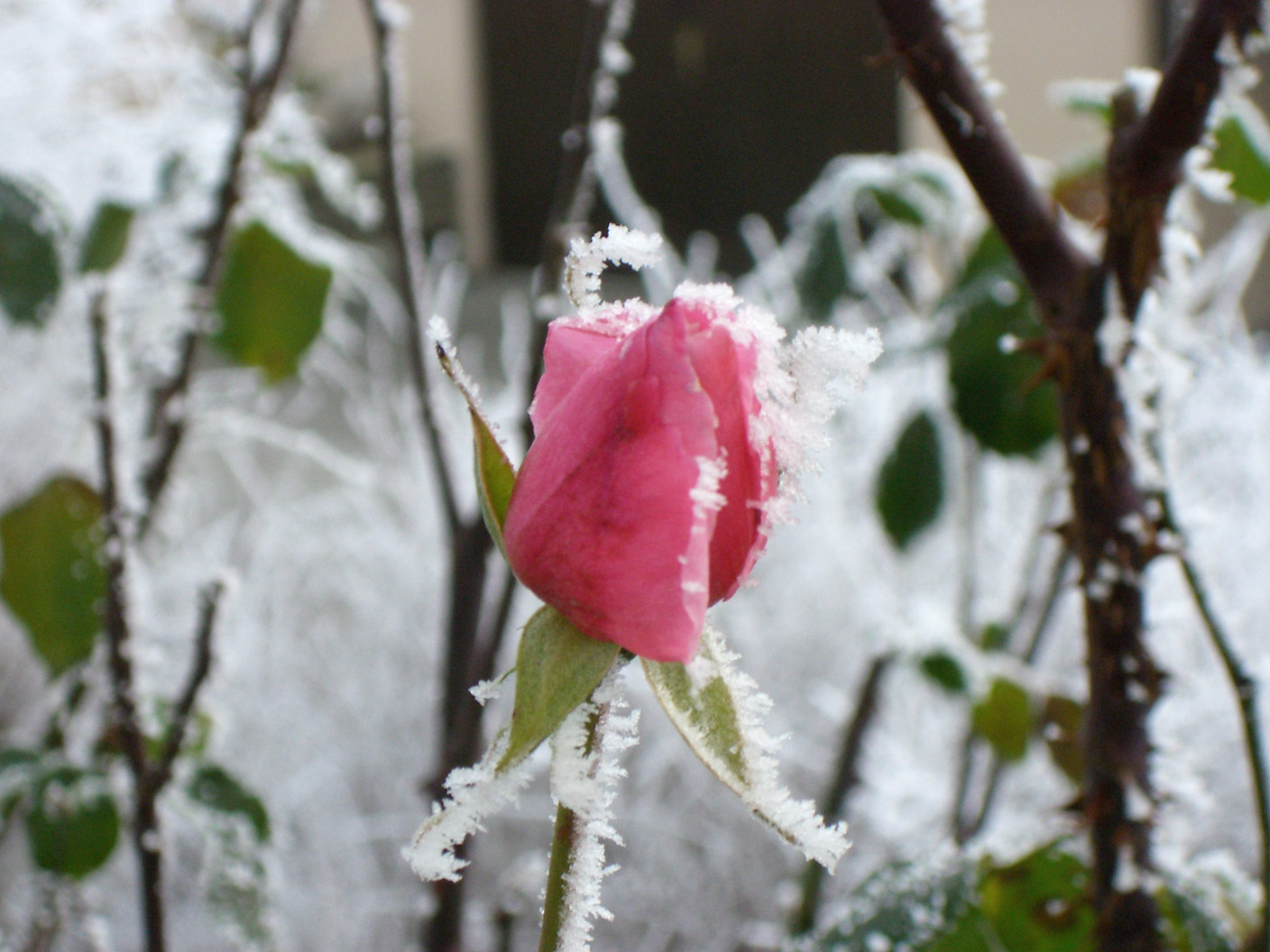
Hoar frost on Rosa sp.

- Frost will destroy fresh growth causing stems and leaves to wilt, turn black and fall away from the plant. Timing pruning to promote growth after the threat of frost is a means to avoid frost damage.
- Salinity will present in roses as limp and light brown leaves with dry leaf margins. Soil may require testing to determine salinity levels. Symptoms will present if salinity is greater than 1200 parts per million.
- Herbicide damage – Overspray or soil leaching of herbicidal sprays can present with several symptoms:

Prolonged exposure to overspray of glyphosate will cause yellow leaves and new leaves will be small and elongated. Hormone weed sprays (e.g. 2,4-D and 2,4,5-T) may cause grotesque new growth with thin twisted leaves and distorted buds. Plants may die in severe cases. Pre-emergent herbicides contacting the plants' root system via the soil will cause yellowing foliage. Effects of soil borne herbicide may take several years to clear.

Bare-root roses: Plant in late autumn at leaf fall, and from late winter to early spring, before growth resumes. Avoid planting in the middle of winter when the ground is frozen.

Containerised and container-grown roses: Plant all year round, provided the ground is neither frozen, nor very dry.

== Miscellaneous diseases and disorders ==
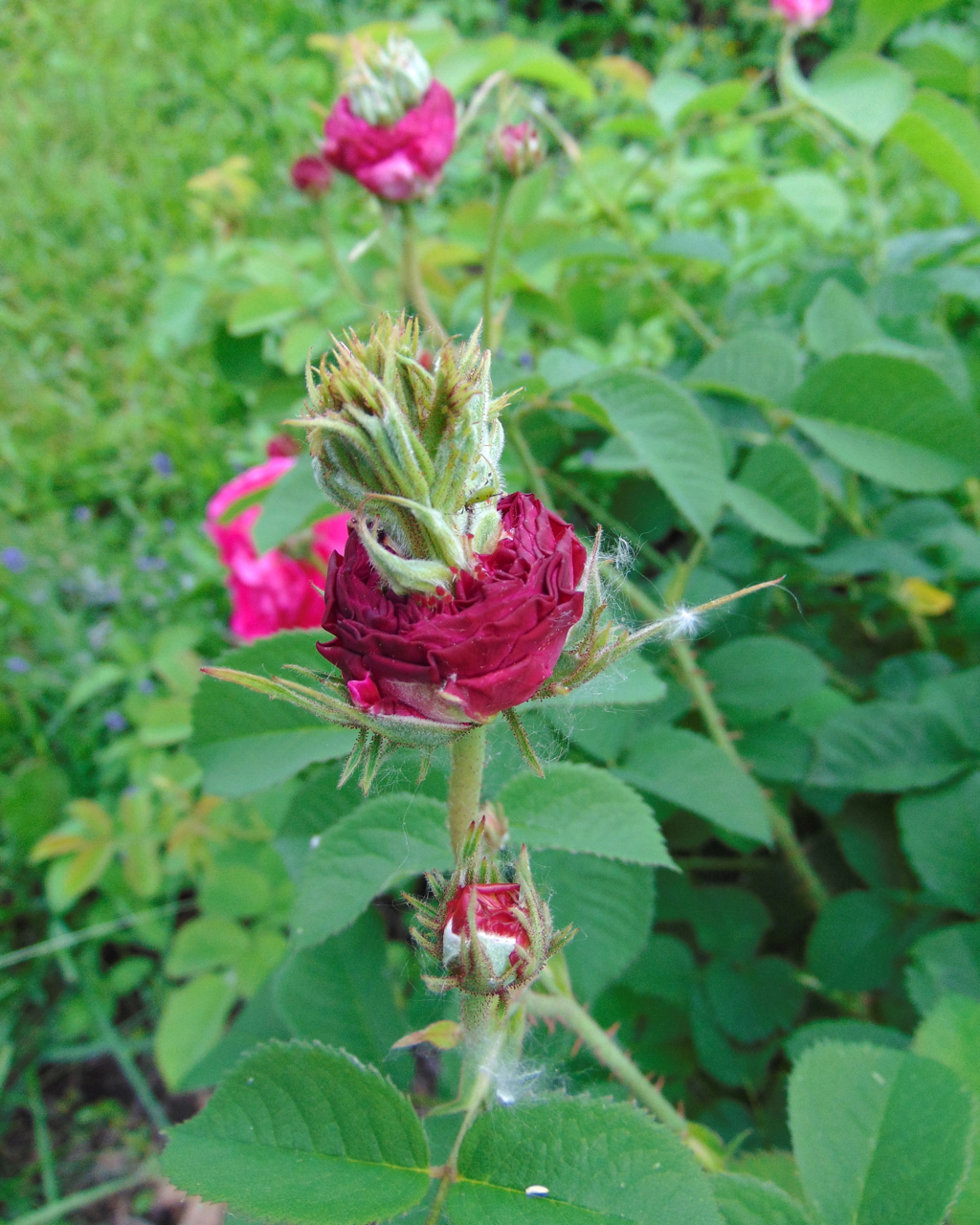
Rose proliferation (Rosa 'Prolifera de Redouté')

Miscellaneous diseases and disorders
Rose flower proliferation	Undetermined
Rose spring dwarf	Undetermined
Rose wilt	Undetermined
