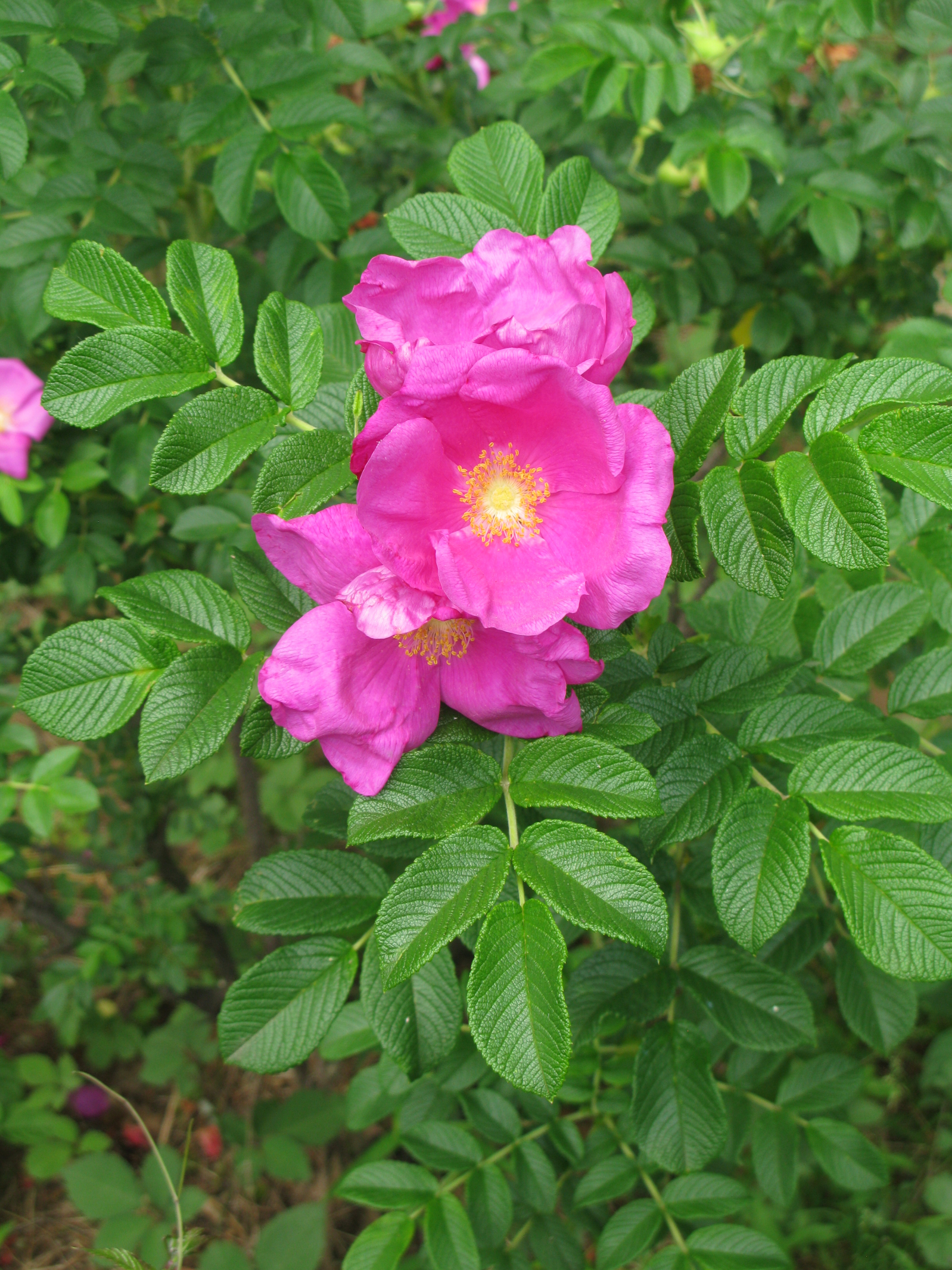
- Rosa rugosa flower

Scientific classification
- Kingdom: Plantae
- Clade: Tracheophytes
- Clade: Angiosperms
- Clade: Eudicots
- Clade: Rosids
- Order: Rosales
- Family: Rosaceae
- Genus: Rosa
- Species: R. rugosa

Binomial name
- Rosa rugosa Thunb.

= Rosa rugosa =

Species of flowering plant

Rosa rugosa (rugosa rose, beach rose, Japanese rose, Ramanas rose, or letchberry) is a species of rose native to eastern Asia, in northeastern China, Japan, Korea and southeastern Siberia, where it grows on beach coasts, often on sand dunes. It is distributed in much of northern Europe, New Zealand, Canada, and the United States. It is a different species from Rosa multiflora, which is also known as "Japanese rose".

The Latin word "rugosa" means "wrinkled", referring to the wrinkled leaves. Often used as an ornamental plant, it is an Invasive species in parts of Europe, North America, and South America.

== Description ==
Rosa rugosa is a suckering shrub which develops new plants from the roots and forms dense thickets 2 m tall with stems densely covered in numerous short, straight prickles 5 mm long. The leaves are 5–13 cm long, pinnate with 5–7 leaflets, each leaflet about 2.5 cm long, with a distinctly corrugated (rugose, hence the species' name) surface. The leaf is elliptical in shape with a rounded base or broadly cuneate with a leather feel, dark green top.

The flower has five petals that are usually 6–9 cm in width. The flowers are pleasantly scented, and range in color from dark pink to white (on R. rugosa f. alba (Ware) Rehder), 6–9 cm across, with somewhat wrinkled petals; flowering occurs in spring.

The dark-red edible hips, which resemble cherry tomatoes, are large, 2–3 cm diameter.

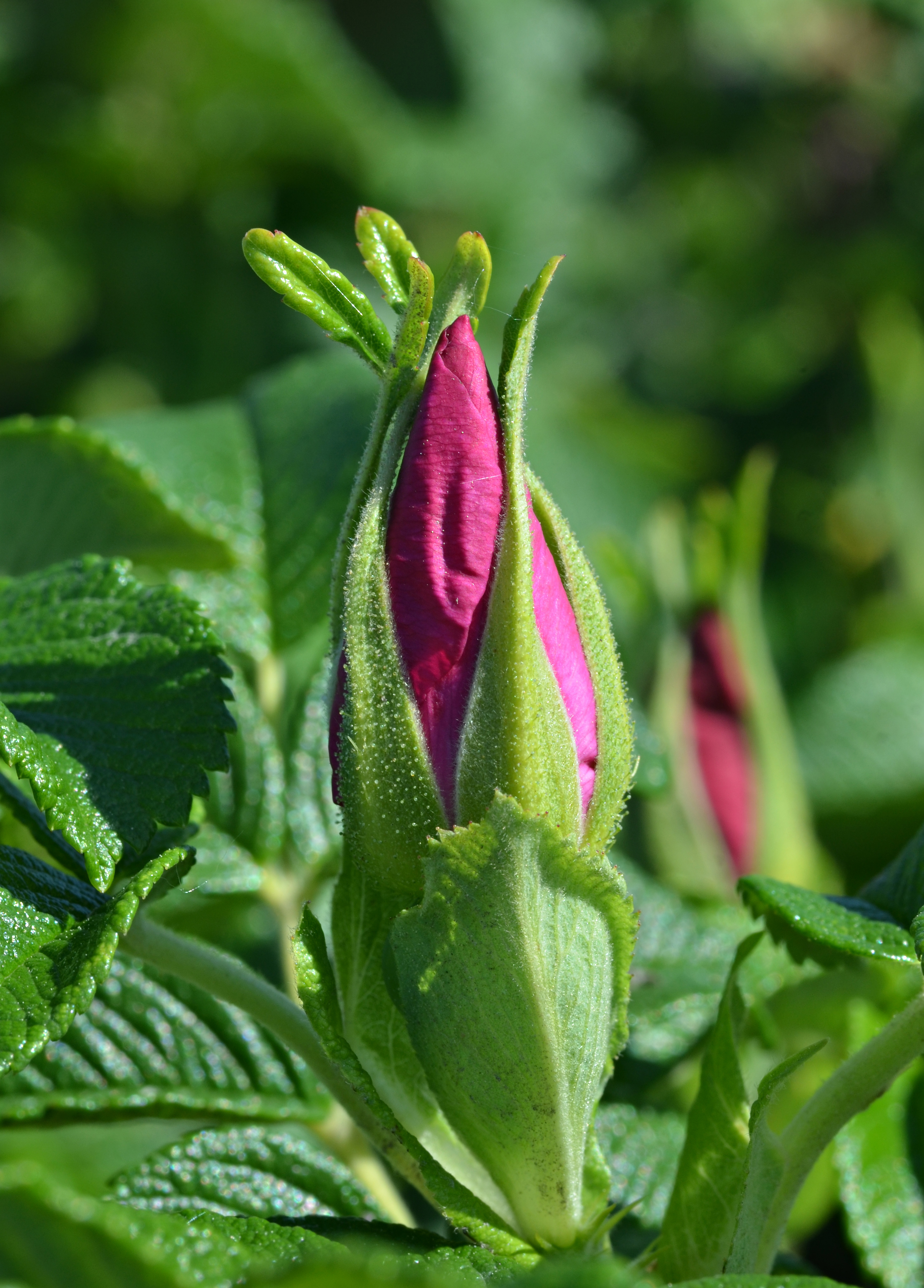
Bud

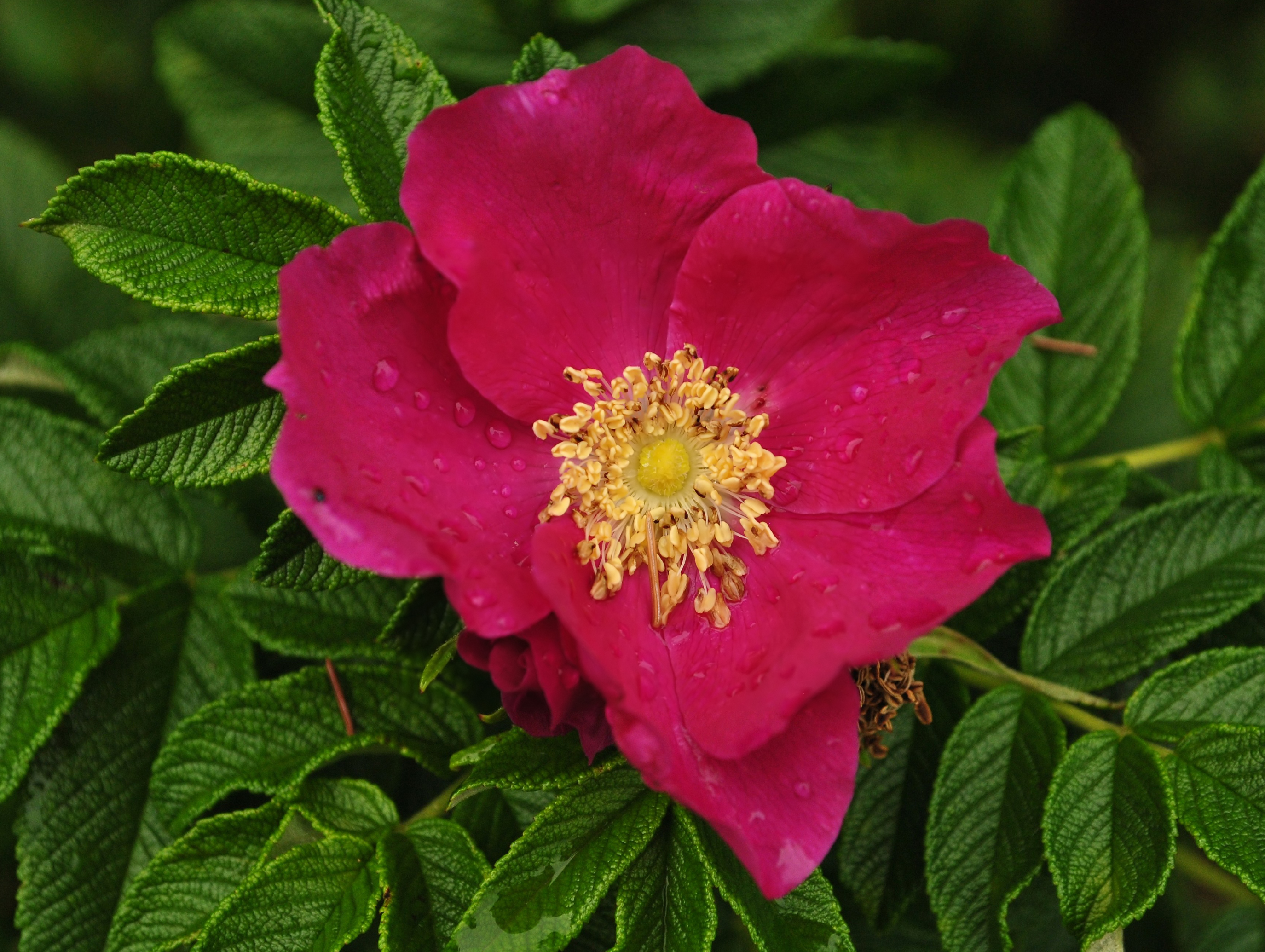
In bloom

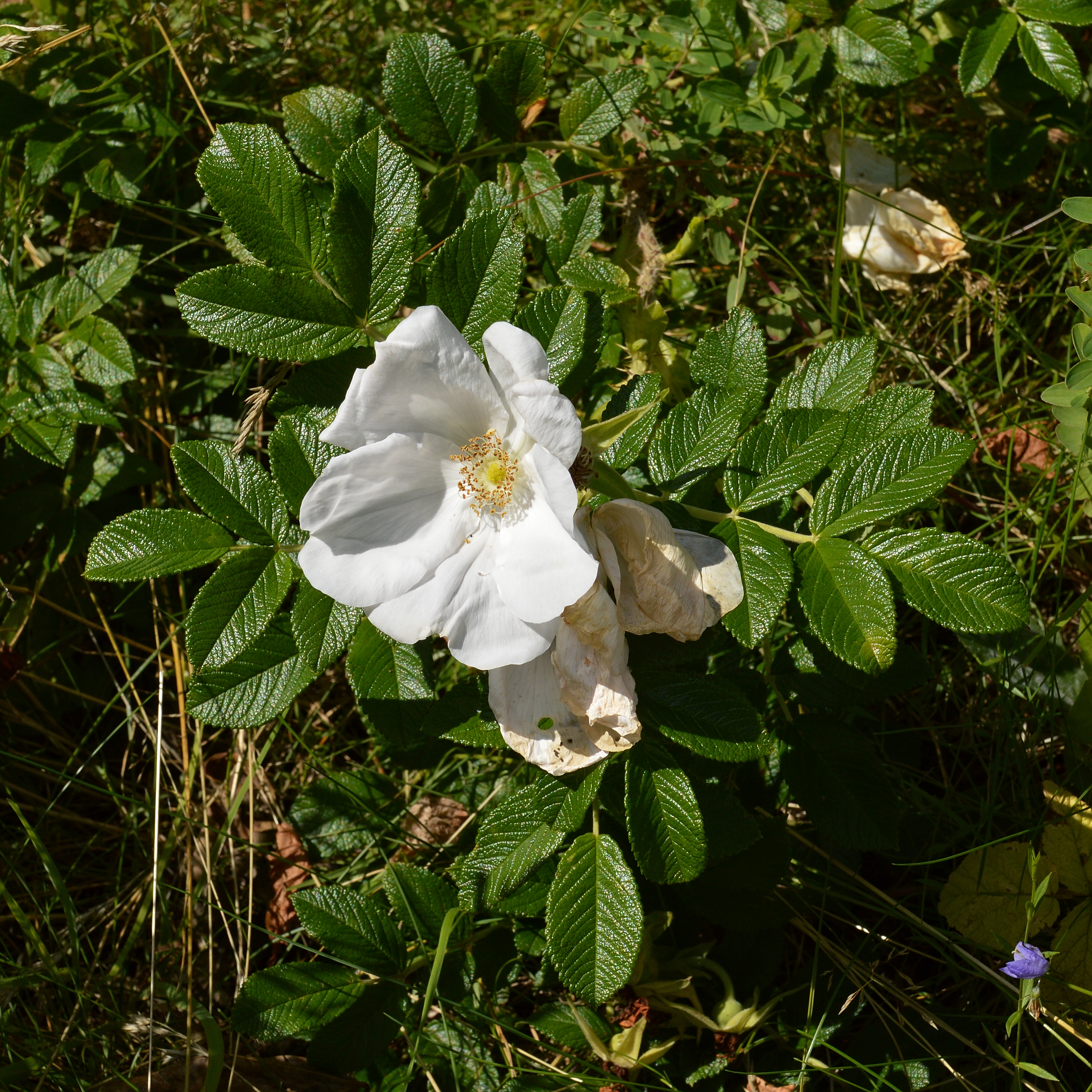
White flower of R. rugosa f. alba

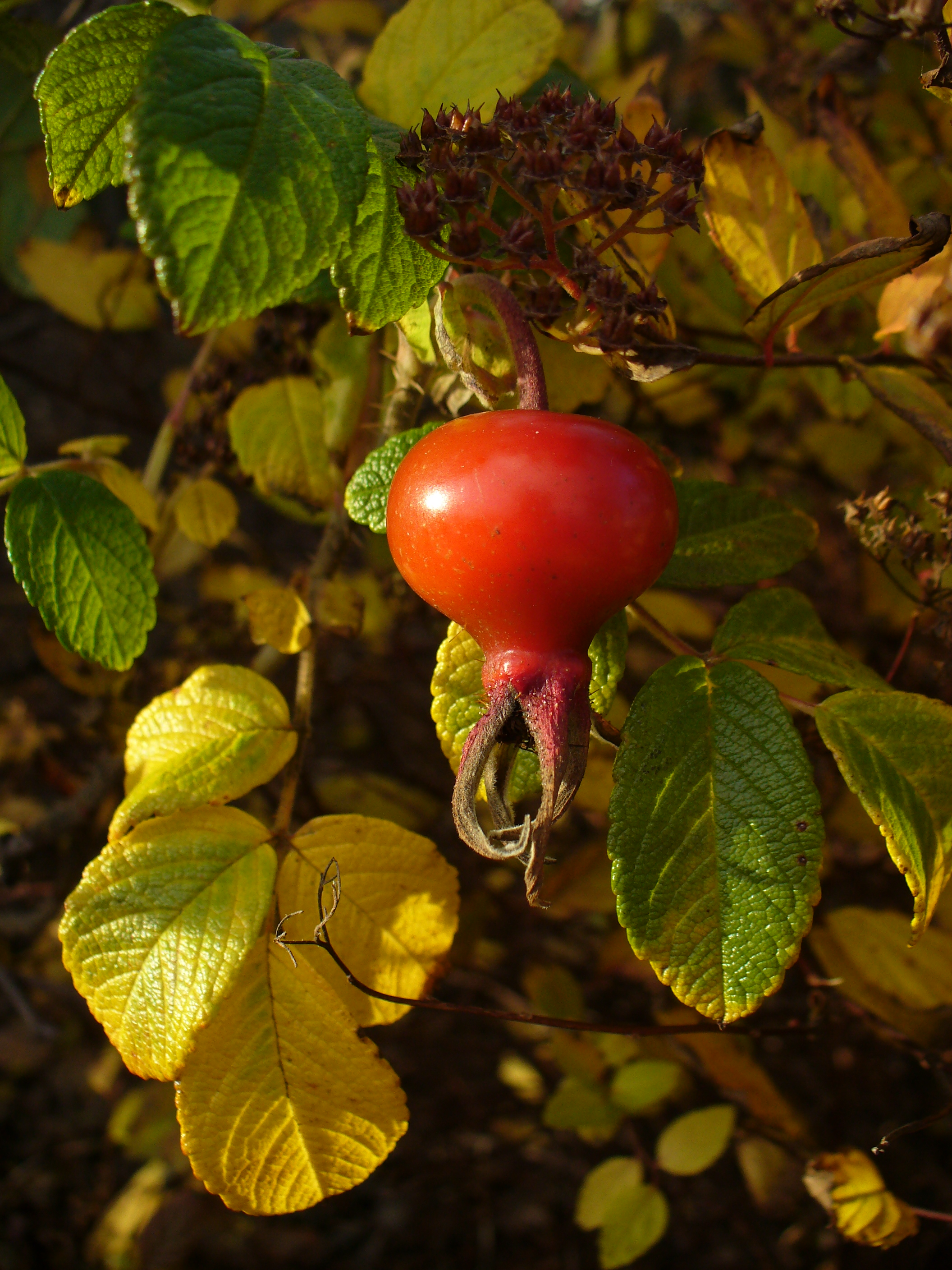
Edible rose hips fruit can resemble tomatoes

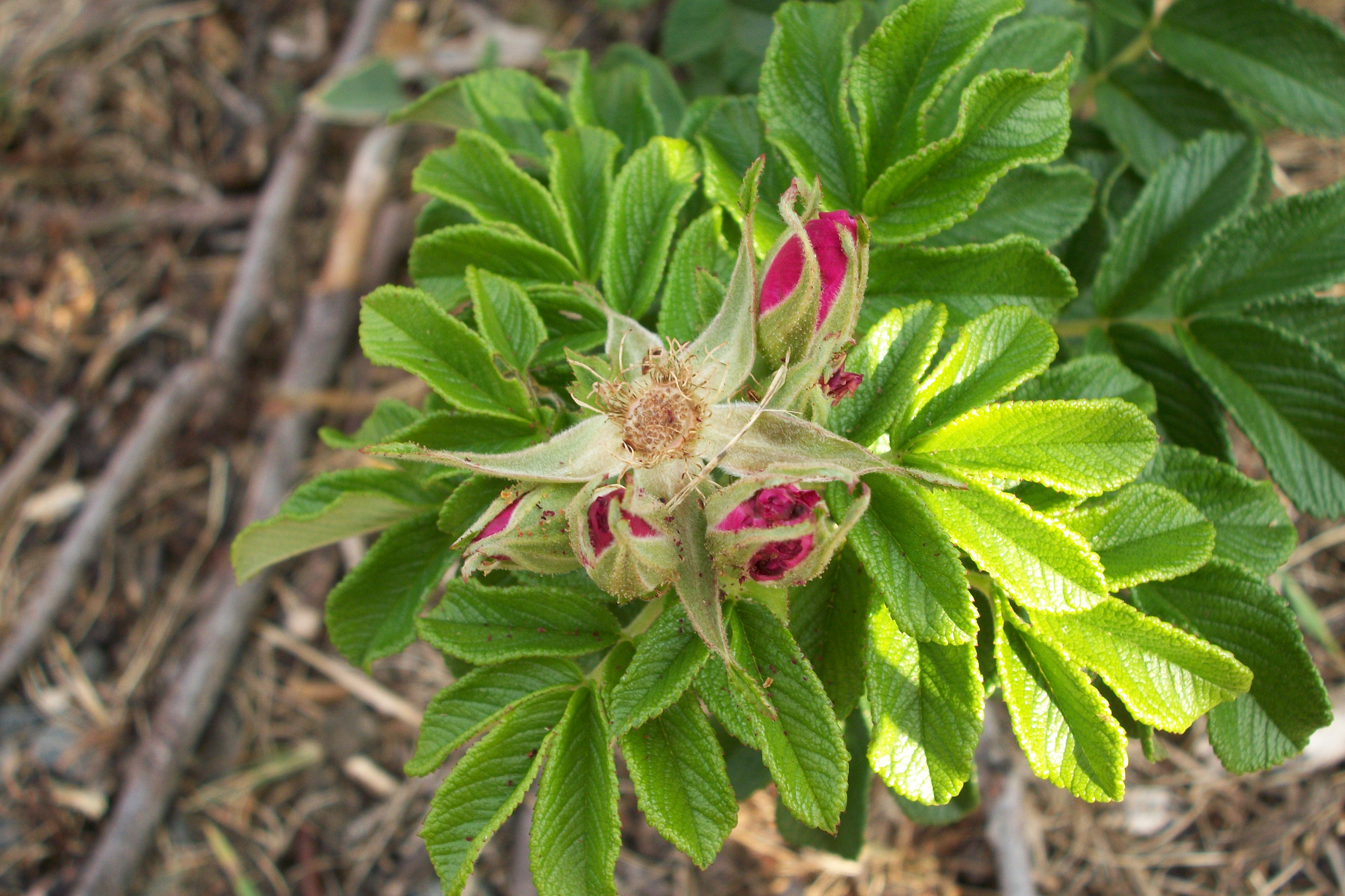
Rosa rugosa buds on Grape Island, Massachusetts

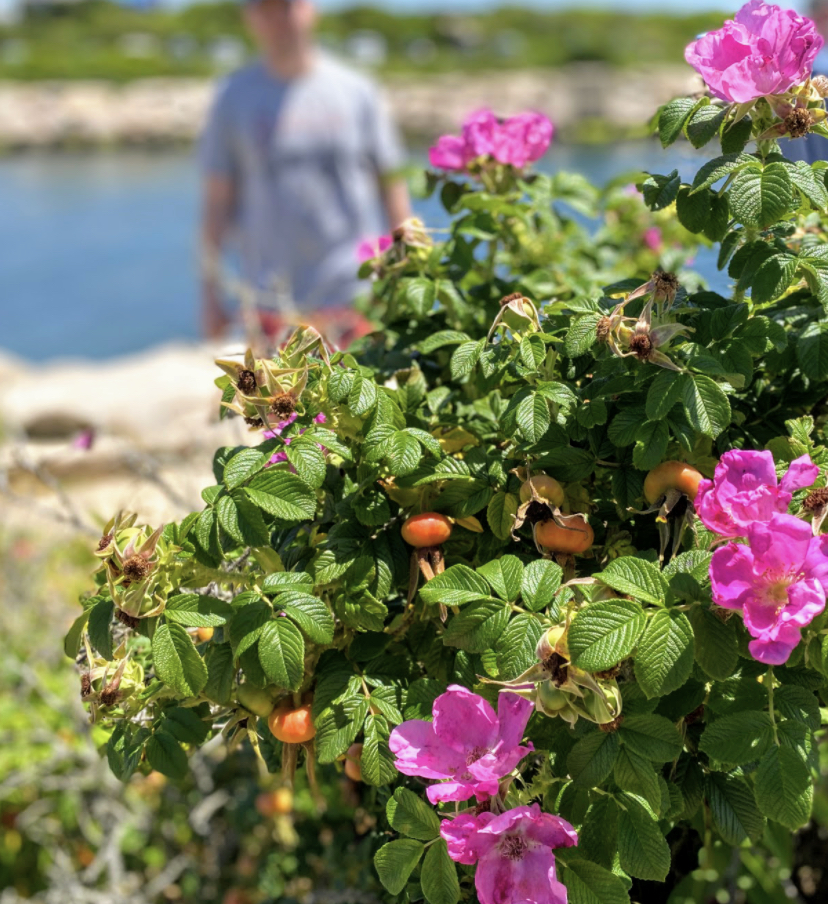
Flowers and fruit on plant at same time

== History ==
This rose species was introduced to America from Japan in the mid-19th century; it was valued both for its flowers and ability to resist beach erosion because it can tolerate salt water spray.

== Cultivation and uses ==
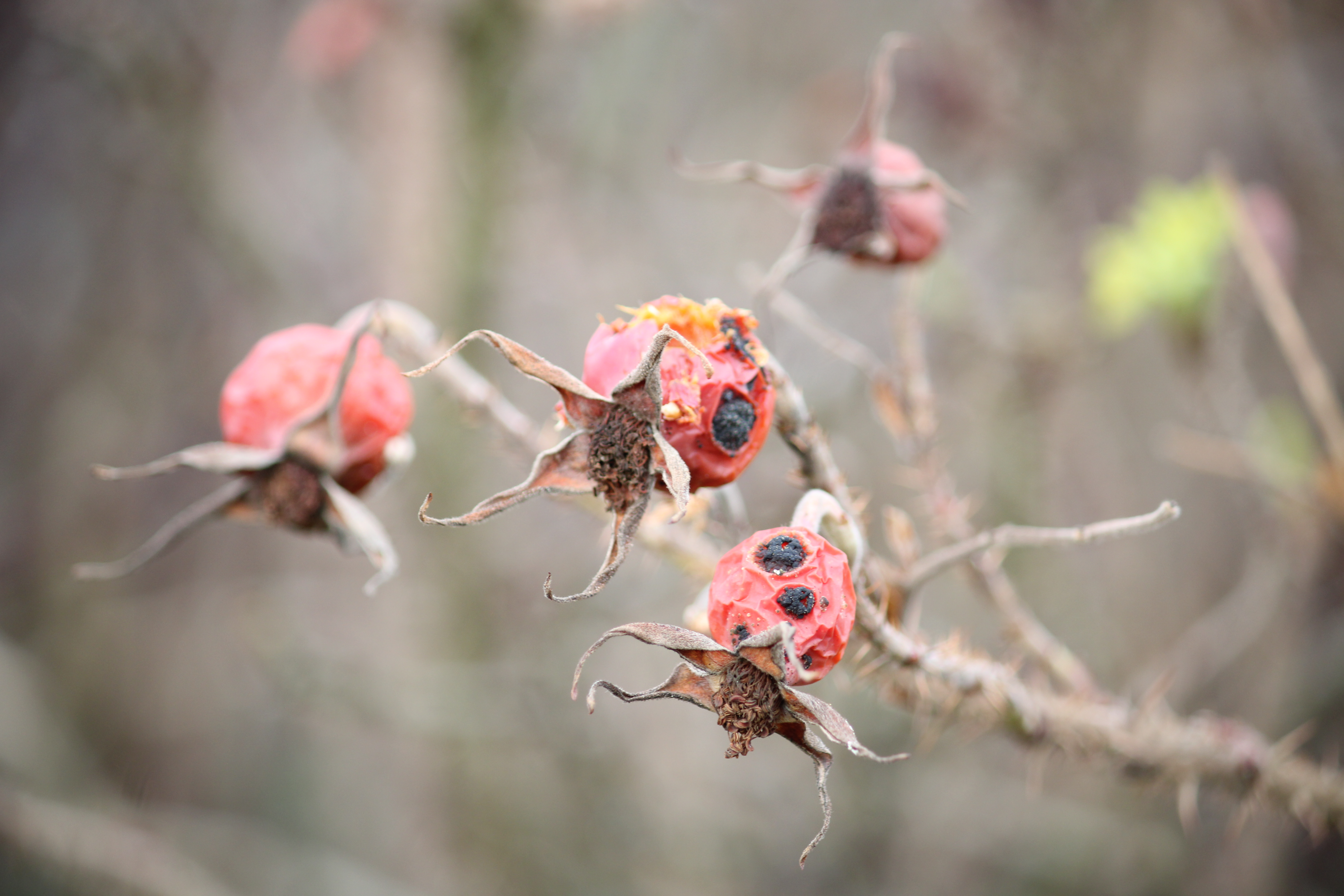
Rosa rugosa near Frederikshavn, Denmark during winter, 2025

Rosa rugosa is widely used as an ornamental plant. It has been introduced to numerous areas of Europe and North America. It has many common names, several of which refer to the fruit's resemblance to a tomato, including beach tomato or sea tomato; others include saltspray rose, and Turkestan rose. In parts of the US, the fruits are also occasionally called beach plums, causing confusion with the actual beach plum, Prunus maritima.

The sweetly scented flowers are traditionally used to make flower jam and dessert in China. They are also used to make pot-pourri in Japan and China. It is used in traditional Chinese medicine. Beach rose hips, like those of other rose species, are edible and can be used to make jams, syrups, tea, or eaten raw.

This species hybridises readily with many other roses, and is valued by rose breeders for its considerable resistance to the diseases rose rust and rose black spot. It is also extremely tolerant of seaside salt spray and storms, commonly being the first shrub in from the coast. It is widely used in landscaping, being relatively tough and trouble-free. Needing little maintenance due to its being very disease resistant, it is suitable for planting in large numbers; its salt-tolerance makes it useful for planting beside roads which need deicing with salt regularly. It can control erosion.

Numerous cultivars have been selected for garden use, with flower colour varying from white to dark red-purple, and with semi-double to double flowers where some or all of the stamens are replaced by extra petals. Popular examples include 'Rubra Plena' (semi-double variant, with strong clove scented dark pink petals and dark green wrinkled leaves and large round orange-red hips), 'Hansa' (fragrant, red-purple double), 'Fru Dagmar Hastrup' (pink, single), 'Pink Grootendorst' (pink, semi-double), 'Blanc Double de Coubert' (white, double) and the more common 'Roseraie de L'Haÿ' (pink, double), which is often used for its very successful rootstock and its ornamental rose hips.

== Invasive species ==
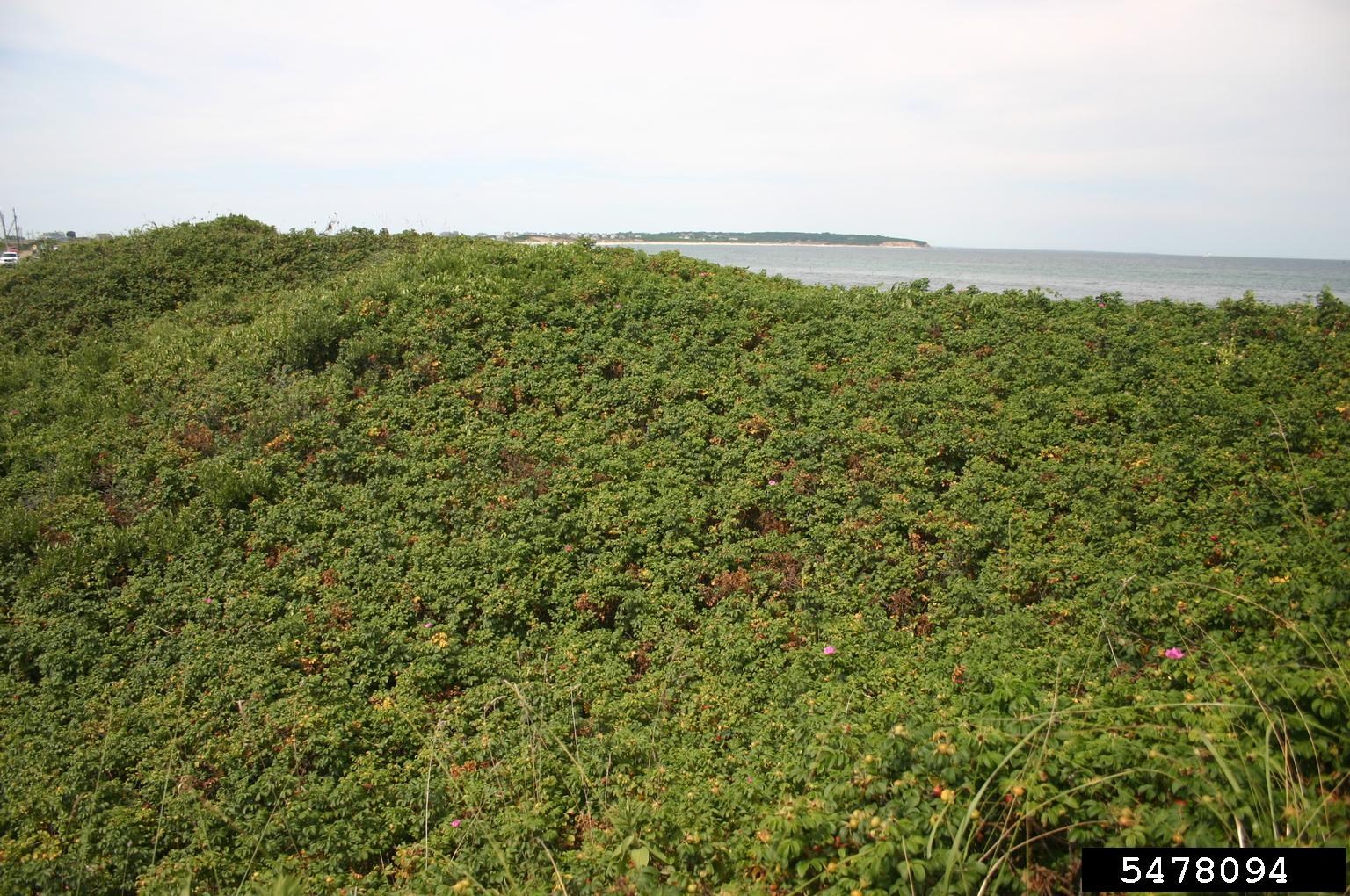
Dense thicket of R. rugosa in coastal New England, United States

In its native China, Rosa rugosa has been labeled as an endangered species due to a noticeable high decline in population rates of the flower, but in other continents where introduced it has become naturalized and is considered invasive. It can outcompete native flora and form dense thickets that completely cover large areas, thereby threatening biological diversity. Because of its robustness, sprouting ability, and seeds that are easily spread and may survive for years, eradication is very difficult and in countries where well-established, full eradication is considered unlikely. The species can also be spread by birds and mammals that eat the berries.

It is naturalized in many parts of Europe, particularly in coastal areas of northern Europe. It was first introduced into England from Japan in 1796, and then in Germany in 1845. This was the first presence of the flower within the European continent. In 1875, Rosa rugosa was found in Denmark and then in Sweden in 1918. By 2001, the flower species had become well established within 16 European countries. Because of its invasiveness, it is illegal to sell the plant in some countries, including Denmark and Finland. On Sylt, an island in the north of Germany, it is sufficiently abundant to have become known as the "Sylt rose".

It is considered noxious in some states of the US. R. rugosa was first introduced into North America in 1845. The first report of it being naturalized far from the location in which it was planted occurred on Nantucket in 1899 and was spreading rapidly by 1911. By 1920, the rose had been well established in Nantucket and in Connecticut. Ten years later it was said to be "straying rapidly" and today it is naturalized on the entire coast of New England and in scattered locations around the Northeast and Pacific Northwest. R. rugosa has also become naturalized in Argentina, Australia and New Zealand.

== Potential allergen ==
Pollen or fragrance of rose may cause an allergic reaction.

== Vernacular names ==
In Japanese, it is called hamanasu (浜茄子) "beach aubergine", hamanashi (浜梨) "beach pear", or simply "bara" (薔薇) "rose". In Mandarin Chinese, it is called méiguì huā (玫瑰花) "rose" or cì méiguì (刺玫瑰) "thorned rose". In Korean, the species is called haedanghwa (Korean: 해당화, 海棠花), literally "flowers near the seashore".
