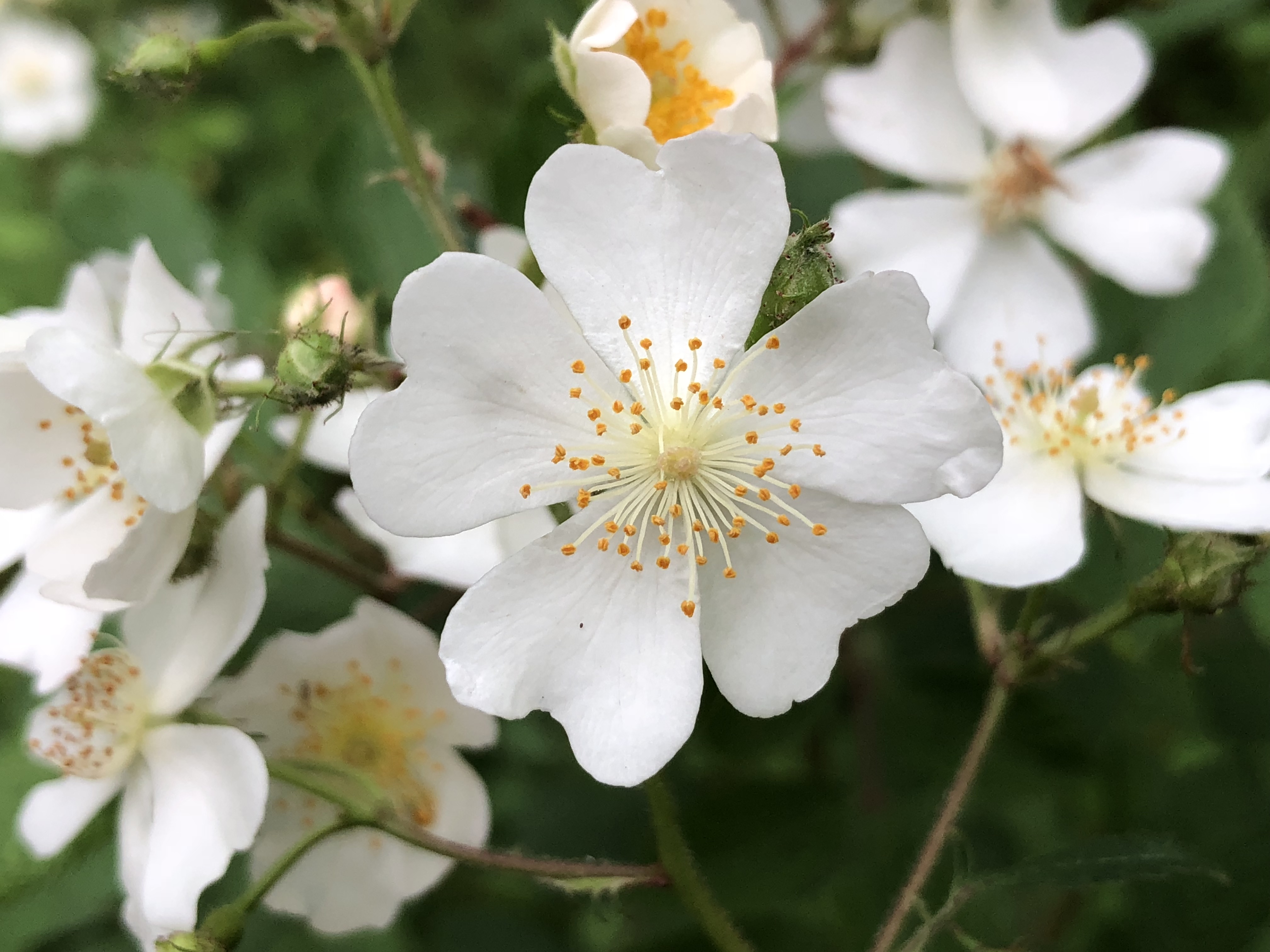

Scientific classification
- Kingdom: Plantae
- Clade: Embryophytes
- Clade: Tracheophytes
- Clade: Spermatophytes
- Clade: Angiosperms
- Clade: Eudicots
- Clade: Rosids
- Order: Rosales
- Family: Rosaceae
- Genus: Rosa
- Species: R. multiflora

Binomial name
- Rosa multiflora Thunb.

Synonyms
- Rosa polyanthos Rössig

= Rosa multiflora =

Species of flowering plant in the rose family

Rosa multiflora (syn. Rosa polyantha) is a species of rose known commonly as multiflora rose, baby rose, Japanese rose, many-flowered rose, seven-sisters rose, Eijitsu rose and rambler rose. It is native to eastern Asia, in China, Japan, and Korea. It should not be confused with Rosa rugosa, which is also known as "Japanese rose", or with polyantha roses which are garden cultivars derived from hybrids of R. multiflora. It was introduced to North America, where it is an invasive species, forming extensive, impenetrable stands within forest understories, thickets, borders, and lowlands. It can be identified by its characteristic fringed stipules, which form pairs at the bases of leaf stalks bearing 3–89 leaves.

== Description ==
It is a scrambling perennial shrub climbing over other plants to a height of 3–5 m (9 ft 10 in – 16 ft 5 in), with stout stems with recurved prickles (sometimes absent). It reproduces through seed as well as vegetatively, rooting from the tips of its long, arching canes. The leaves are 5–10 cm (2–4 in) long, pinnately compound, with 5–9 leaflets and feathered stipules. The flowers are produced in large corymbs, each flower small, 1.5–4 cm (5/8–1 5/8 in) diameter, white or pink, borne in early summer. The fruits are hips and are reddish to purple, 6–8 mm (15/64–5/16 in) diameter.

One plant may produce 500,000 seeds each year. Seeds are tan to yellow and up to 0.16 inches, and seed germination rates can be as high as 90% in ideal conditions and seeds remain viable for up to 20 years.

== Taxonomy ==
Two varieties have been identified which have many synonyms of their own:

- Rosa multiflora var. adenochaeta (Koidz.) Ohwi
- Rosa multiflora var. cathayensis Rehder & E.H.Wilson

As well as the type variety Rosa multiflora var. multiflora.

== Distribution and habitat ==
It is native to eastern Asia and invasive in parts of North America. It prefers full sun and well-drained, less fertile soils, and is tolerant of partial shade, in which it is less productive. It can be found in pastures and along field edges and roads.

== Cultivation and uses ==
Rosa multiflora is grown as an ornamental plant and also used as a rootstock for grafted ornamental rose cultivars. It is also used for erosion control and as a living fence.

In eastern North America, Rosa multiflora is considered an invasive species. It was originally introduced from Asia as a soil conservation measure, as a natural hedge to border grazing land, and to attract wildlife. In some regions the plant is classified as a noxious weed. In grazing areas, it is generally considered to be a serious pest, though it is excellent fodder for goats.

The achene fruits (hips) of Rosa multiflora (referred to as "Eijitsu" or "Rosae fructus") are used to make a tea and in traditional medicine historically and in modern clinical practice to treat constipation.

== Management ==
The targeted removal of multiflora rose often requires an aggressive technique, such as the full removal of the plant in addition to the root structure. Pruning and cutting back of the plant often leads to re-sprouting. Two natural biological controls include the rose rosette disease and the rose seed chalid (Megastigmus aculeastus var. nigroflavus). Patches of introduced multiflora rose in Pennsylvania are displaying symptoms of rose rosette disease, which can lead to decline and death.

== Gallery ==
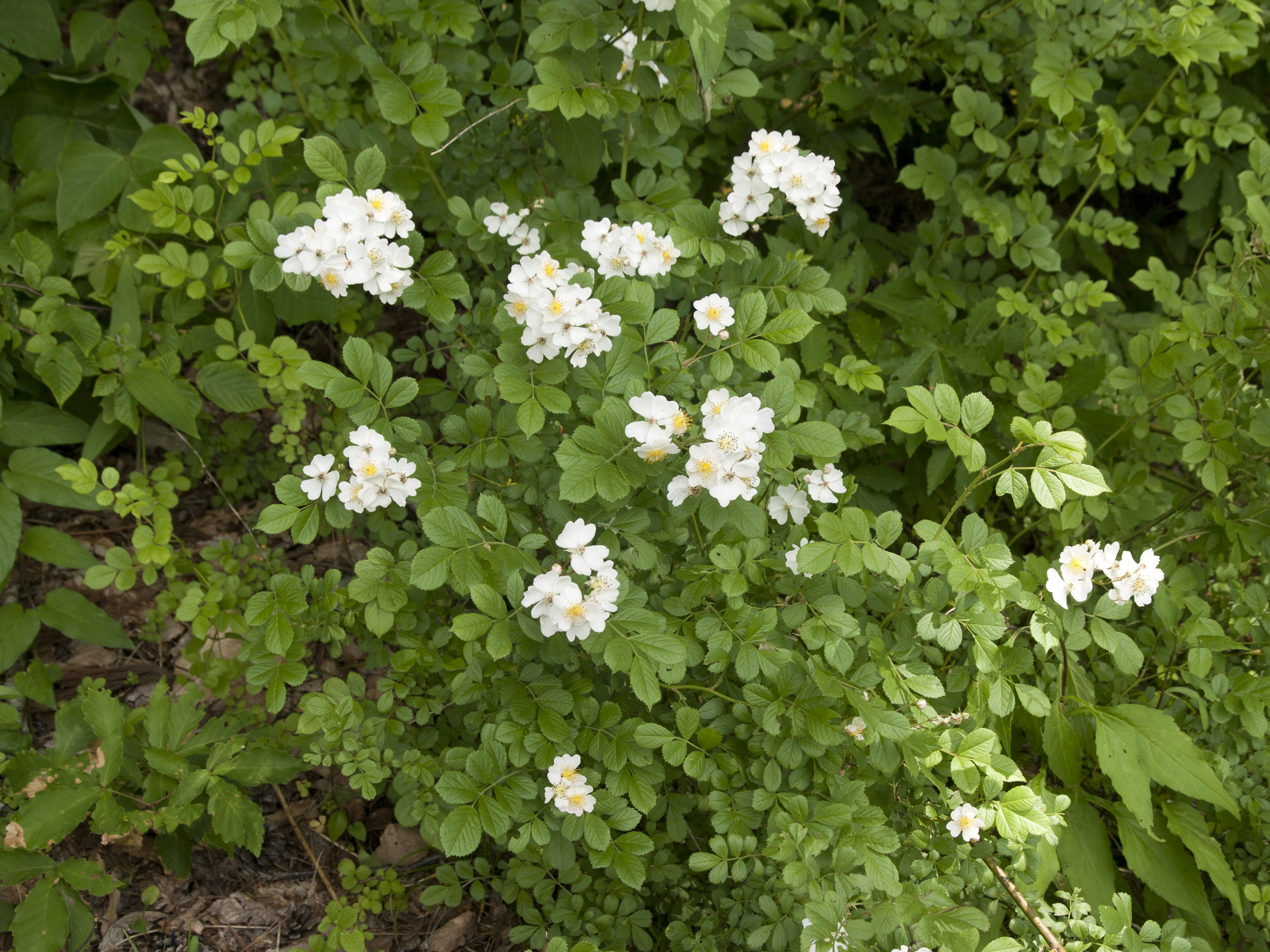

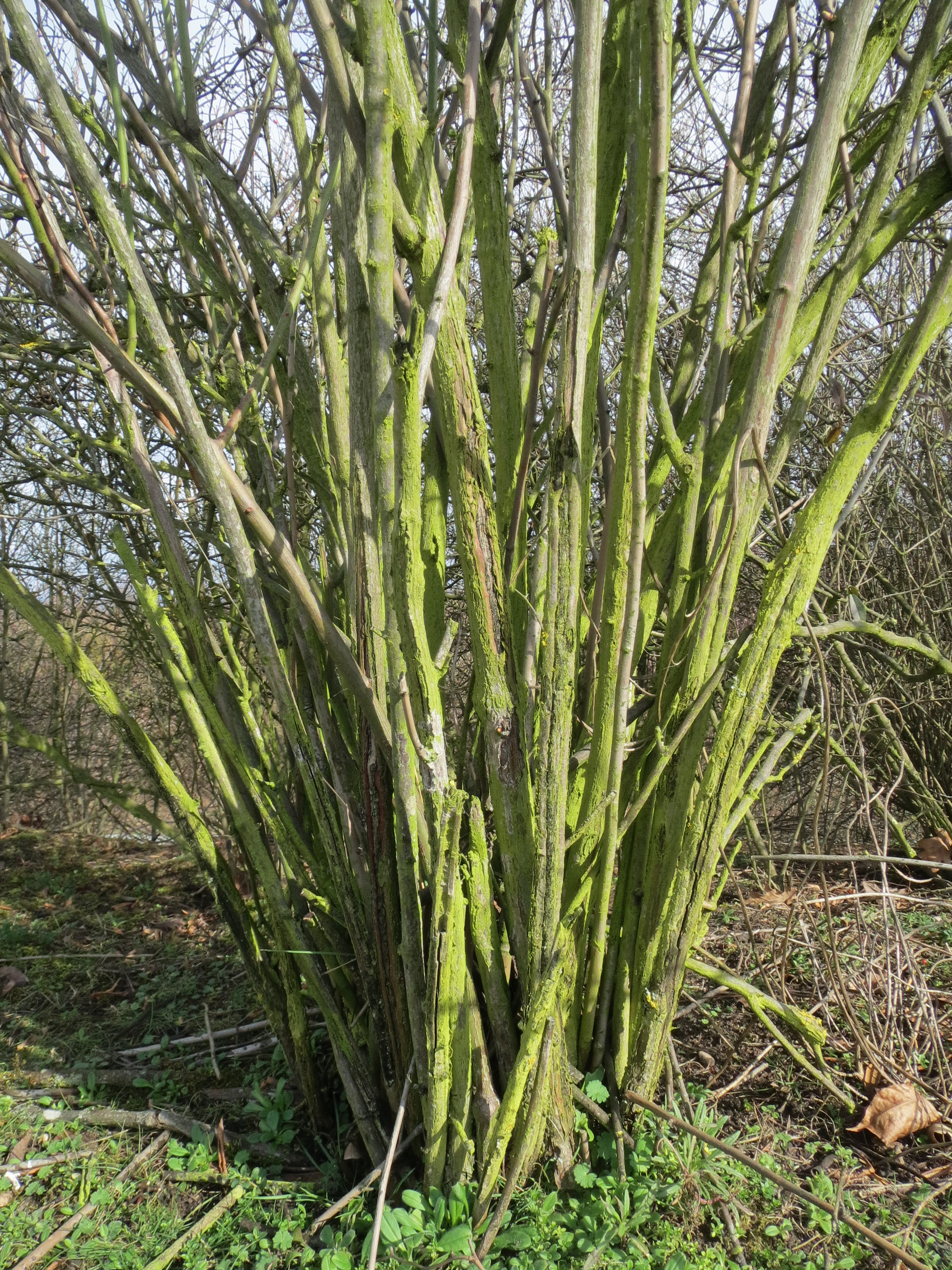

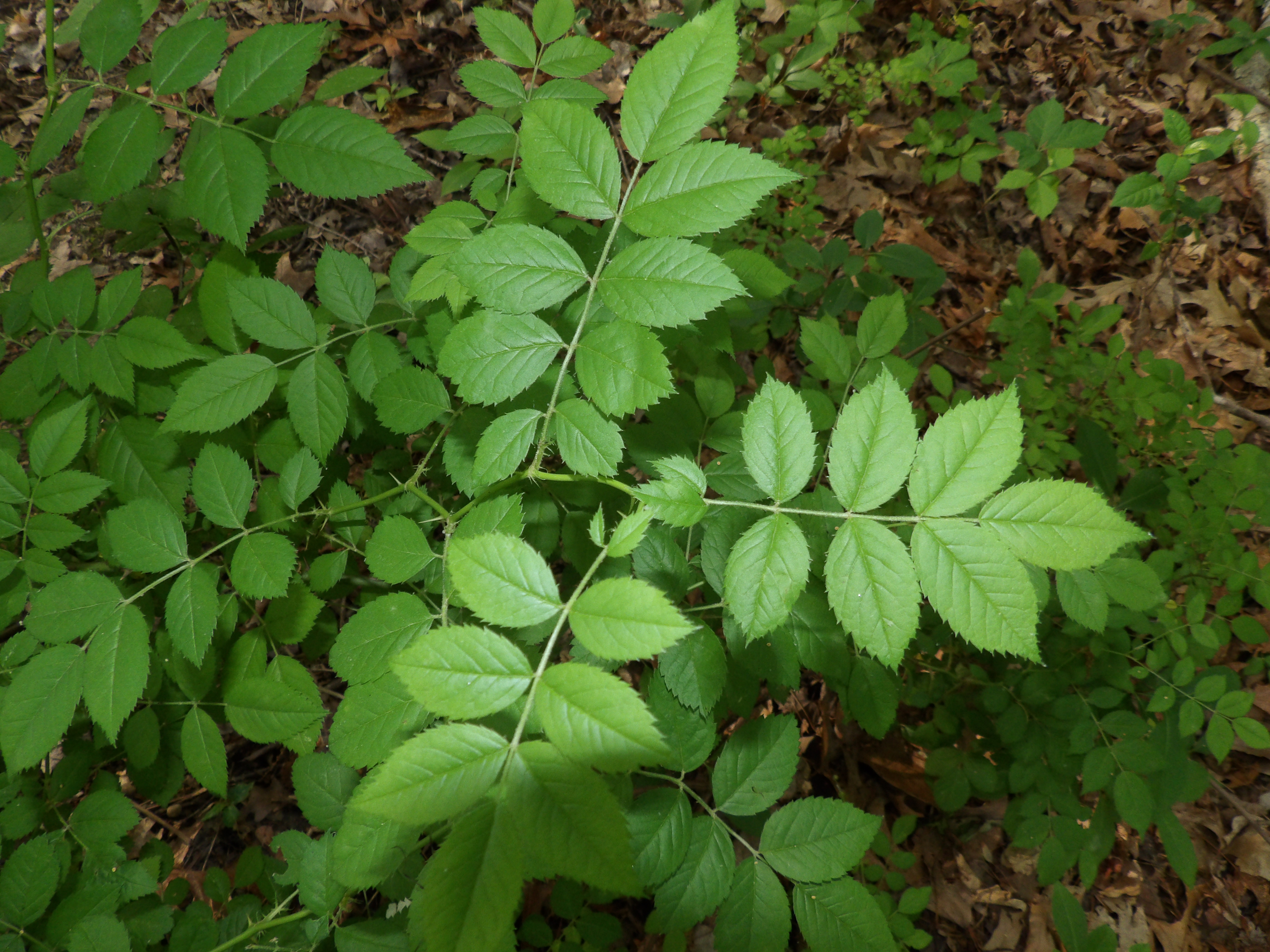

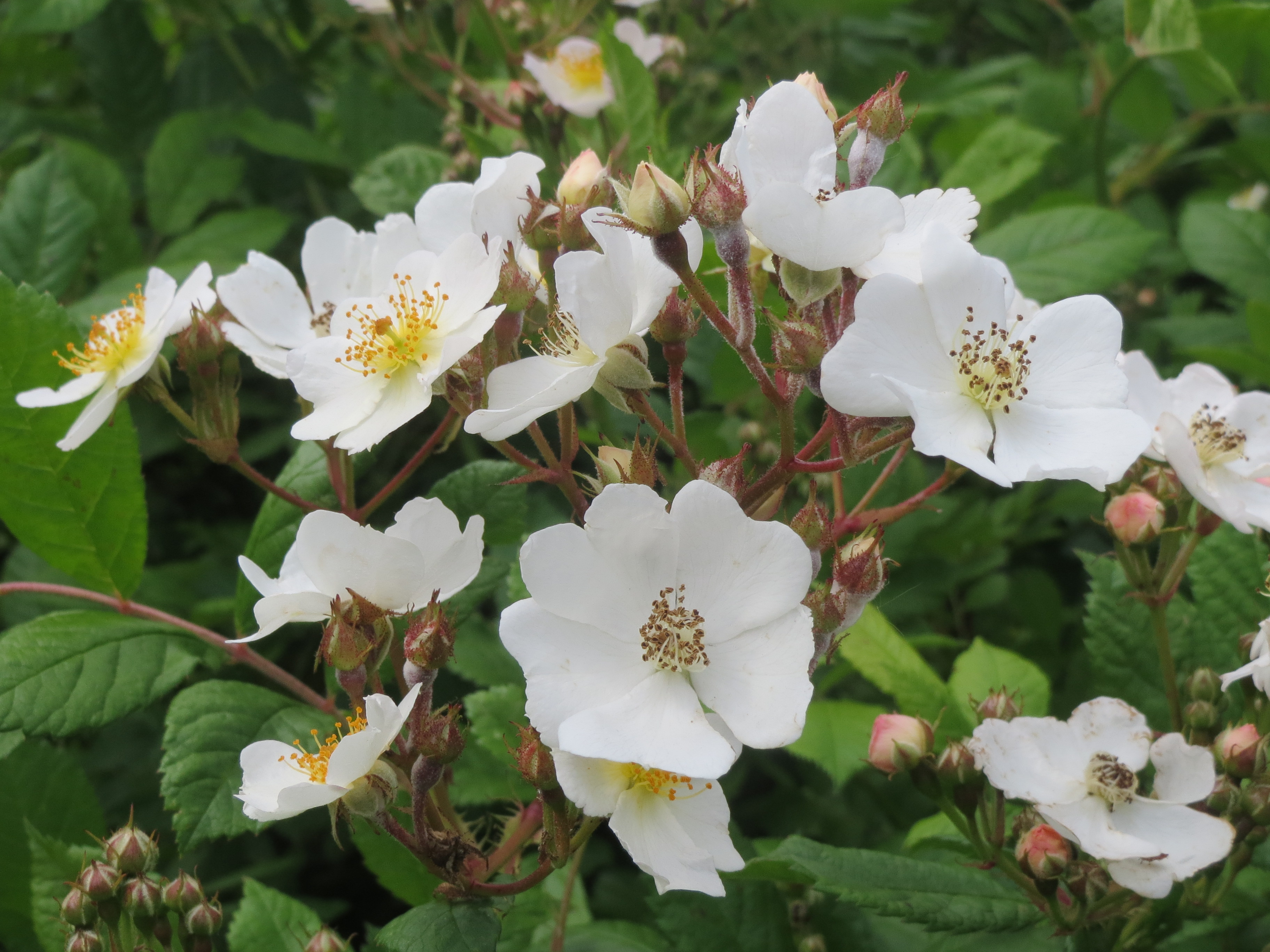

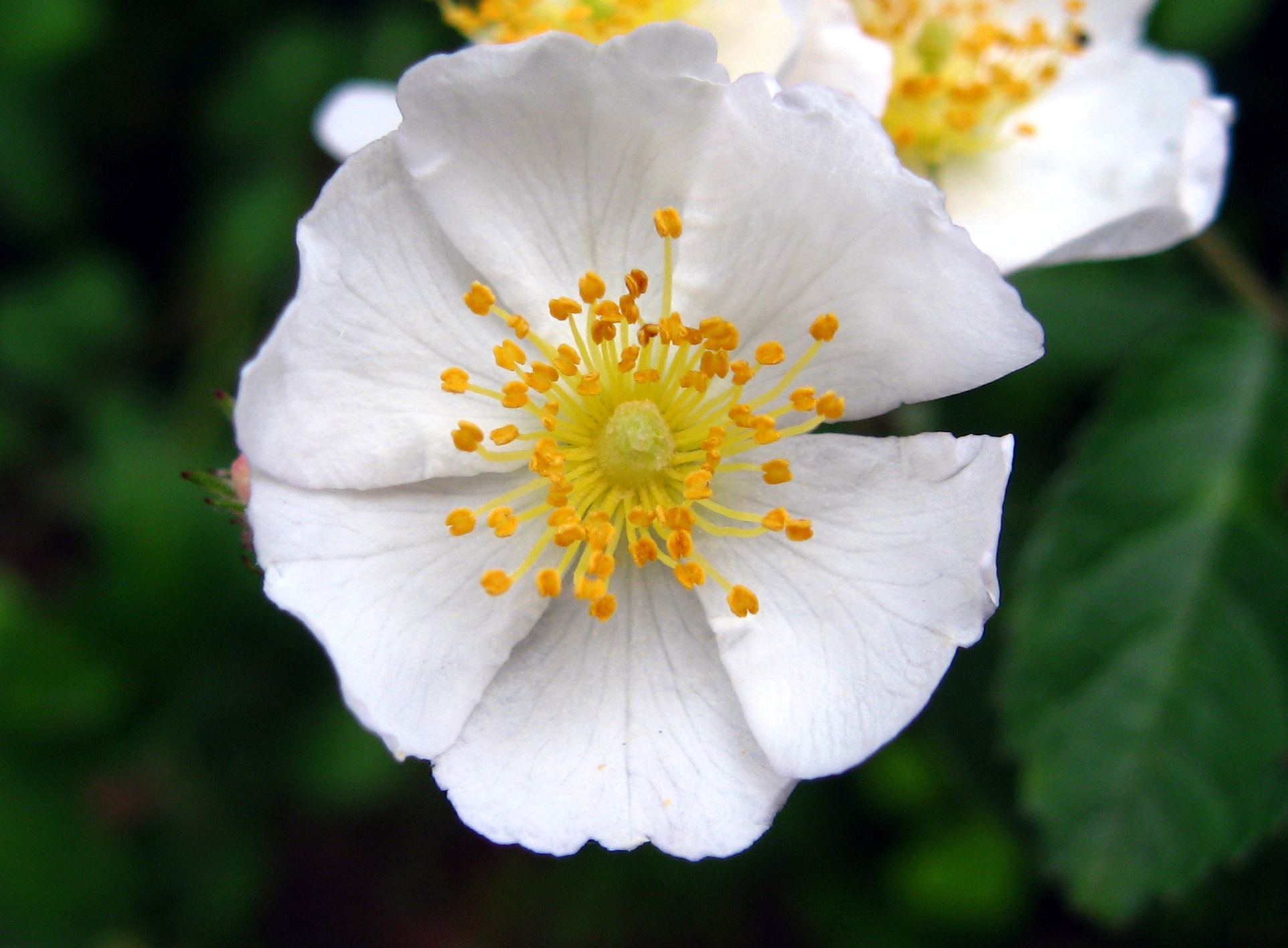

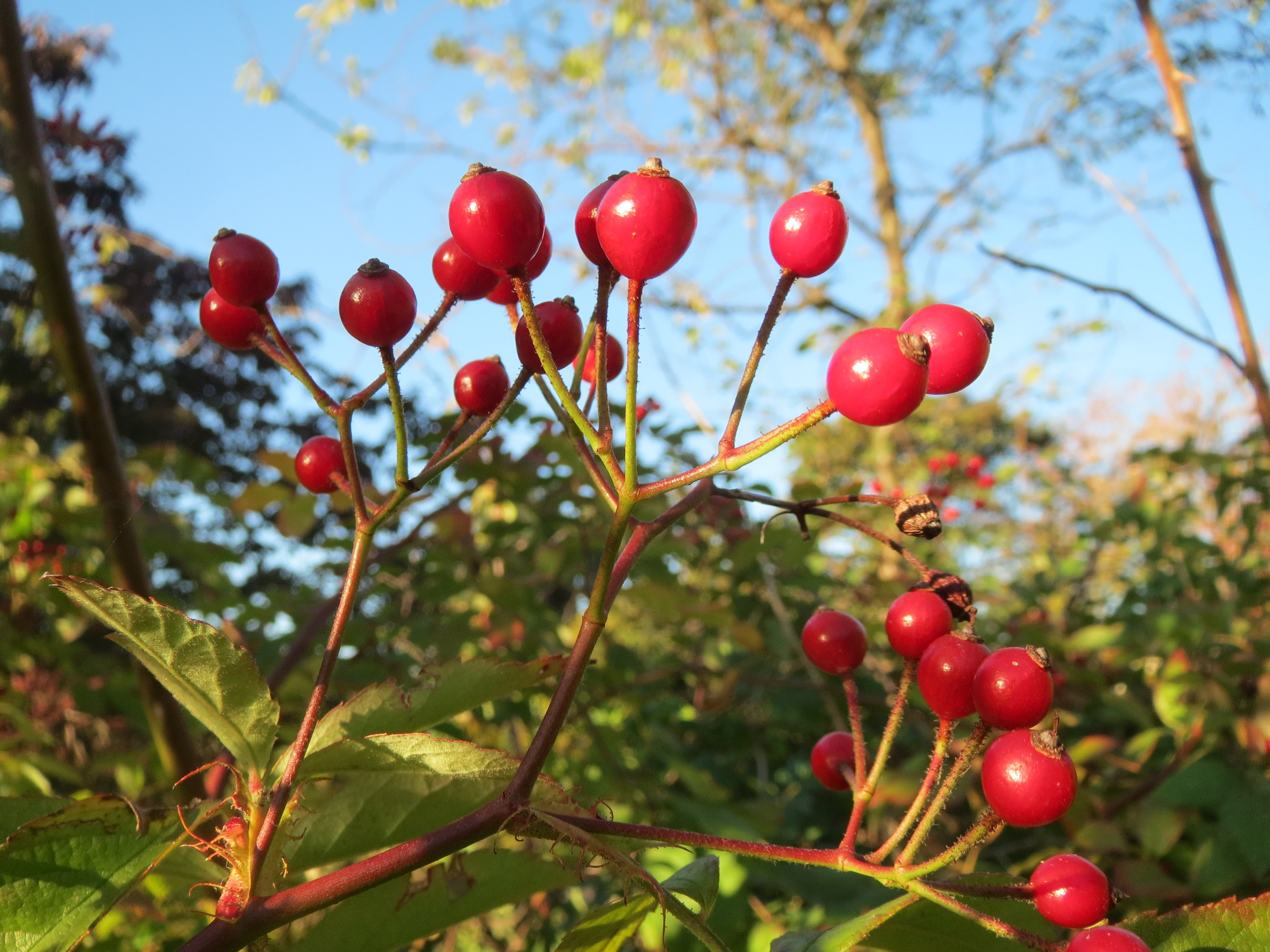
Hips (fruits)

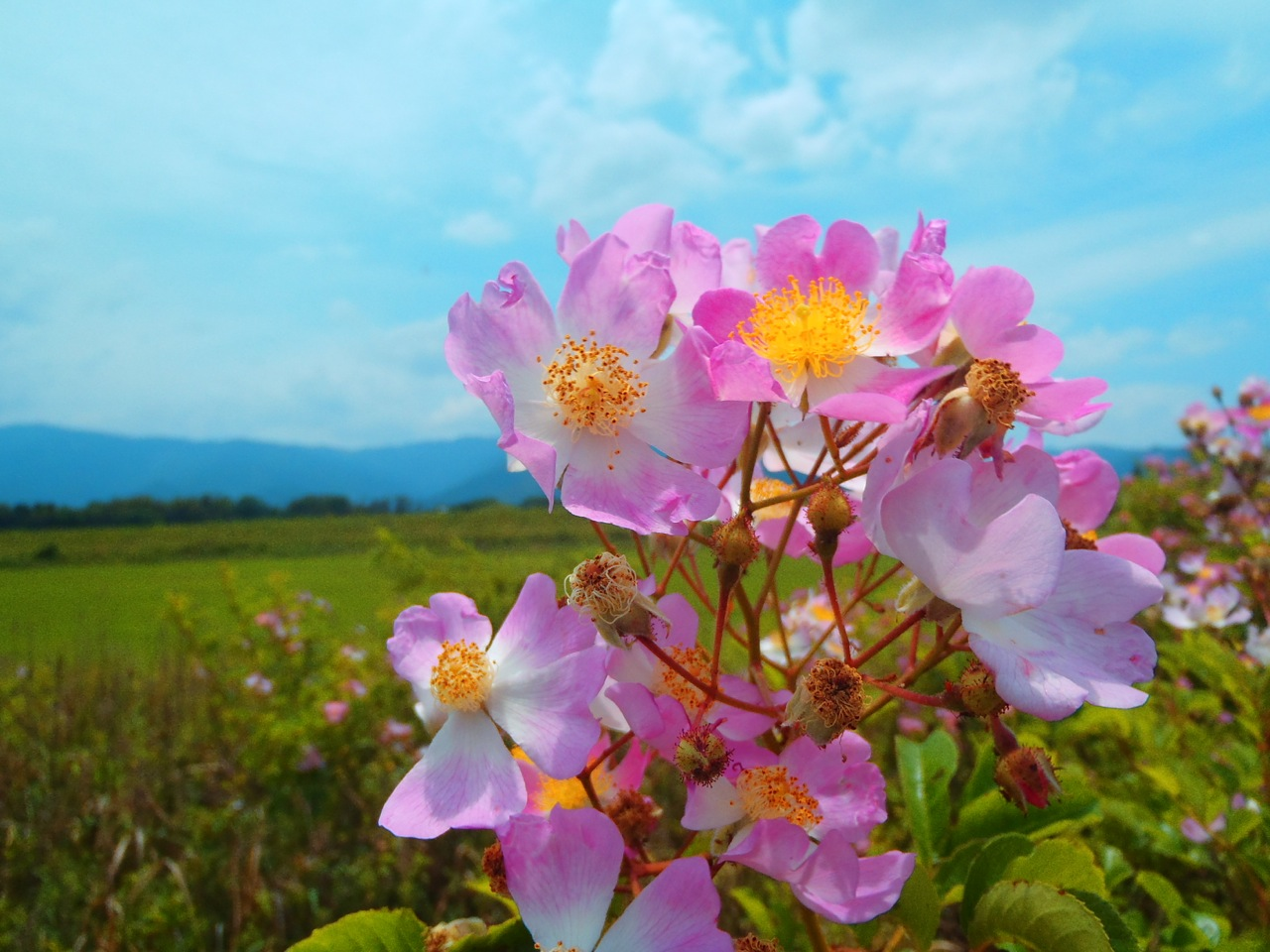
Blossom of var. cathayensis on the Kuma River of Japan
