= Cryptosporium minimum =

Scientific classification
- Kingdom: Fungi
- Division: Ascomycota
- Class: incertae sedis
- Order: incertae sedis
- Family: incertae sedis
- Genus: Cryptosporium
- Species: C. minimum

Binomial name
- Cryptosporium minimum Laubert (1907)

Species of fungus

Cryptosporium minimum is an ascomycete fungus that is a plant pathogen.
