= Cryptosporella umbrina =

Scientific classification
- Kingdom: Fungi
- Division: Ascomycota
- Class: Sordariomycetes
- Order: Diaporthales
- Family: Gnomoniaceae
- Genus: Cryptosporella
- Species: C. umbrina

Binomial name
- Cryptosporella umbrina (Jenkins) Jenkins & Wehm., (1935)

Synonyms
- Diaporthe umbrina Jenkins, (1918); Kensinjia umbrina (Jenkins) J. Reid & C. Booth, (1989)

Species of fungus

Cryptosporella umbrina is a plant pathogen.
