= Elsinoë rosarum =

Elsinoe rosarum

Scientific classification
- Kingdom: Fungi
- Division: Ascomycota
- Class: Dothideomycetes
- Order: Myriangiales
- Family: Elsinoaceae
- Genus: Elsinoë
- Species: E. rosarum

Binomial name
- Elsinoë rosarum Jenkins & Bitanc., (1957)

Synonyms
- Gloeosporium rosarum (Pass.) Grove, (1937); Phyllosticta rosarum Pass., (1881); Sphaceloma rosarum (Pass.) Jenkins, (1932)

Species of fungus

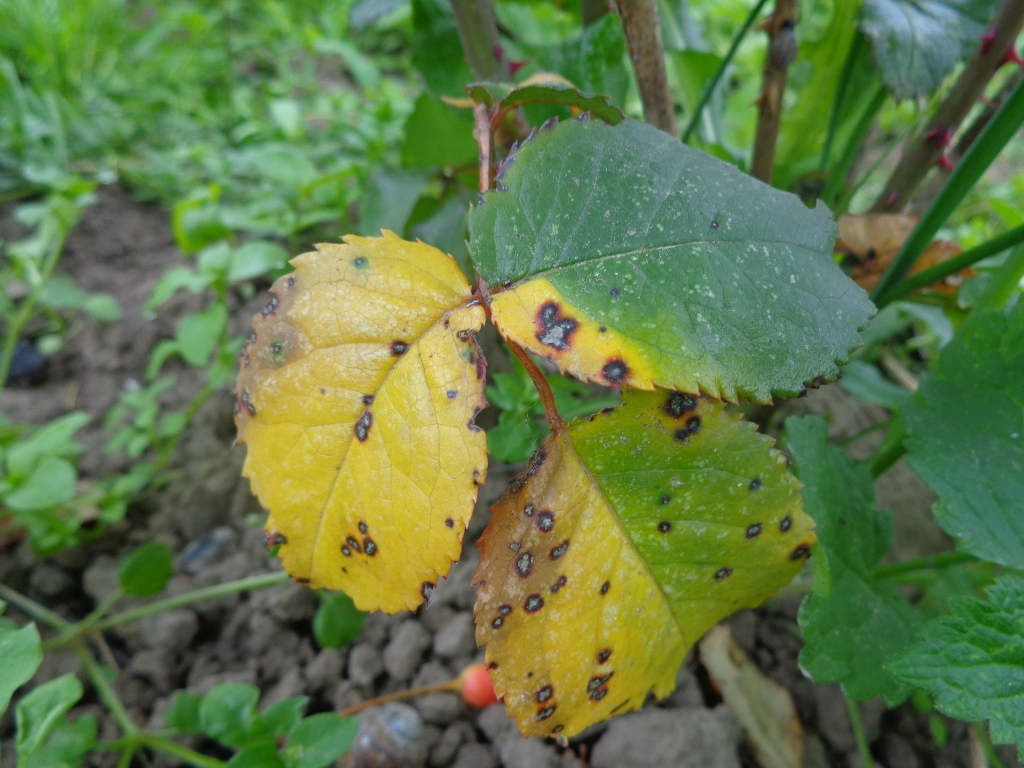

Elsinoe rosarum, Anthracnose, is a fungal plant pathogen. It is a condition found on roses, causing leaves to have irregular dark margins and spots. The disease usually appears during wet weather.
