= Sphaerulina rehmiana =

Scientific classification
- Kingdom: Fungi
- Division: Ascomycota
- Class: Dothideomycetes
- Order: Mycosphaerellales
- Family: Mycosphaerellaceae
- Genus: Sphaerulina
- Species: S. rehmiana

Binomial name
- Sphaerulina rehmiana Jaap, (1910)

Synonyms
- Septoria rosae Desm., (1831)

Species of fungus

Sphaerulina rehmiana is a fungal plant pathogen infecting roses. It causes grey-brown leaf spots, followed by leaf drop.
