= List of safflower diseases =

This article is a list of diseases of safflowers (Carthamus tinctorius).

== Bacterial diseases ==
Bacterial diseases
Bacterial leaf spot and stem blight	Pseudomonas syringae

== Fungal diseases ==
Fungal diseases
Alternaria leaf spot	Alternaria carthami
Botrytis hard rot	Botrytis cinerea Botryotinia fuckeliana [teleomorph]
Cercospora leaf spot	Cercospora spp.
Charcoal rot	Macrophomina phaseolina
Damping-off	Pythium spp. Phytophthora spp.
Fusarium wilt	Fusarium oxysporum f.sp. carthami
Phytophthora root and stem rot	Phytophthora spp. Phytophthora cactorum Phytophthora cryptogea Phytophthora drechsleri Phytophthora nicotianae var. parasitica = Phytophthora parasitica
Pythium root rot	Pythium spp.
Powdery mildew	Leveillula lappae Golovinomyces montagnei
Ramularia leaf spot	Ramularia spp.
Rhizoctonia blight, stem canker	Rhizoctonia solani Thanatephorus cucumeris [teleomorph]
Rust (foliage and hypocotyl)	Puccinia calcitrapae var. centaureae = Puccinia carthami Puccinia verruca
Sclerotinia stem rot and head blight	Sclerotinia sclerotiorum
Septoria leaf spot	Septoria spp.
Verticillium wilt	Verticillium dahliae

== Nematodes, parasitic ==
Nematodes, parasitic
Root-knot	Meloidogyne spp.

== Viral and Phytoplasma ==
Viral and mycoplasmalike organism [MLO] diseases
Alfalfa mosaic	Alfalfa mosaic virus
Cucumber mosaic	Cucumber mosaic virus
Lettuce mosaic and necrosis	Lettuce mosaic virus
Phyllody	Phytoplasma
Turnip mosaic and necrosis	Turnip mosaic virus
