= List of poinsettia diseases =

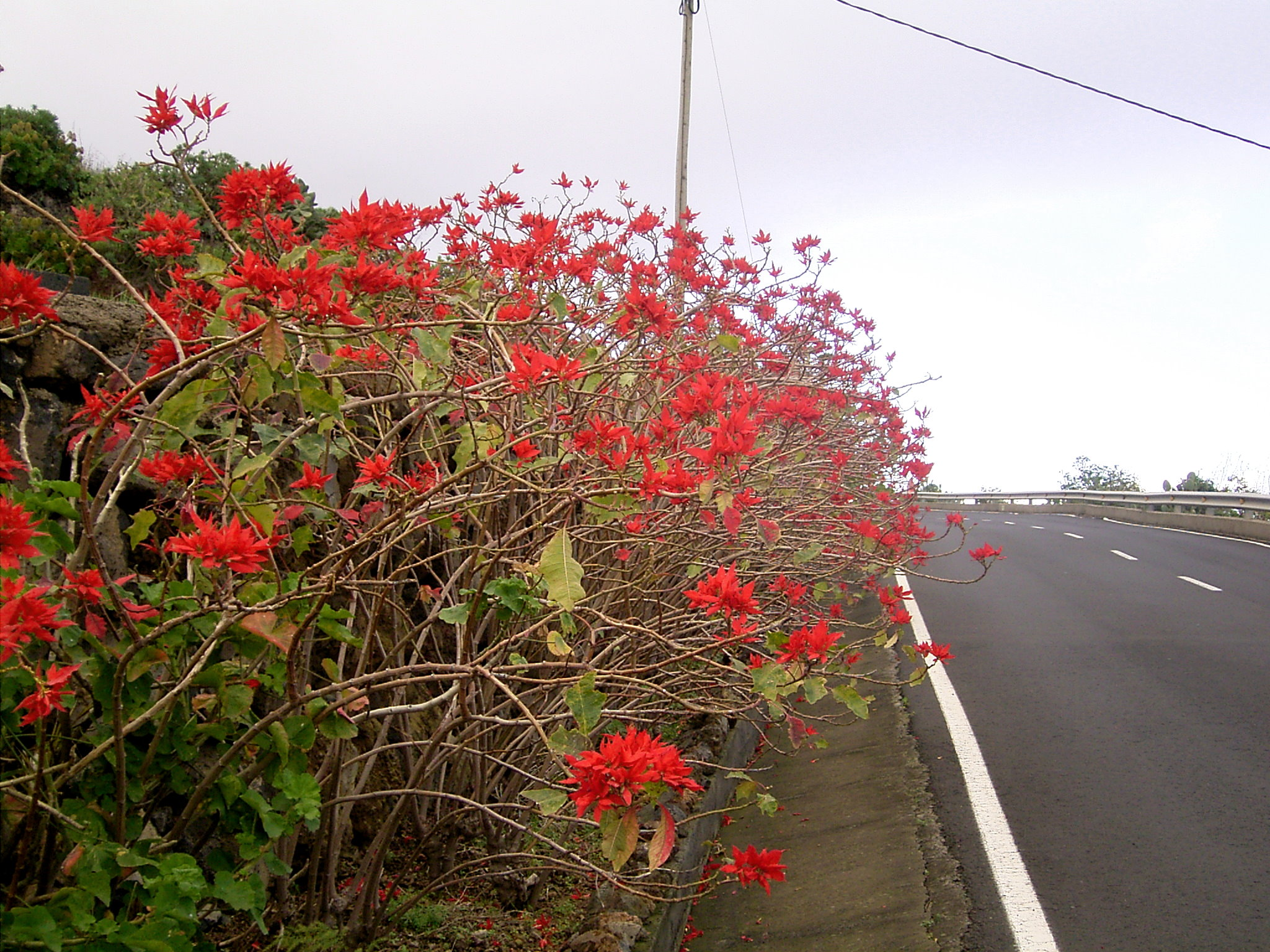
Poinsettia growing in Barlovento, Canary Islands

This article is a list of diseases of poinsettia (Euphorbia pulcherrima).

== Bacterial diseases ==
Disease	Cause	Image
Bacterial leaf spot	Curtobacterium flaccumfaciens = Corynebacterium flaccumfaciens pv. poinsettiae	
Bacterial leaf spot	Pseudomonas cichorii	
Bacterial leaf spot	Pseudomonas marginalis	
Bacterial leaf spot	Pseudomonas syringae subsp. syringae	
Bacterial leaf spot	Xanthomonas campestris pv. poinsettiaecola	
Bacterial stem rot	Erwinia carotovora subsp. carotovora	
Bacterial stem rot	Erwinia chrysanthemi	
Crown gall	Agrobacterium tumefaciens	
Greasy center	Pseudomonas viridiflava	

== Fungal diseases ==
This also includes oomycetes

Disease	Cause	Image
Anthracnose	Colletotrichum capsici	
Anthracnose	Colletotrichum dematium	
Anthracnose	Glomerella cingulata (Colletotrichum gloeosporioides anamorph)	
Aerial blight	Ceratobasidium ramicola (Rhizoctonia ramicola anamorph)	
Basal stem and crown rot	Sclerotinia sclerotiorum	
Basal stem and root rot	Ceratocystis sp.	
Basal stem and root rot	Thielaviopsis basicola anamorph / Chalara elegans synanamorph	
Black rot	Botryodiplodia sp.	
Bract, flower and leaf blight	Phytophthora drechsleri	
Bract spot	Corynespora cassiicola	
Crown and stem rot	Fusarium oxysporum	
Crown and stem rot	Nectria haematococca (Fusarium solani anamorph)	
Cutting rot	Cylindrocladium scoparium	
Dieback	Lasiodiplodia theobromae = Botryosphaeria theobromae	
Gray mold	Botryotinia ricini	
Gray mold	Amphobotrys ricini anamorph) = Botrytis ricini	
Gray mold	Botryotinia fuckeliana (Botrytis cinerea anamorph)	
Leaf necrosis	Cladosporium sp.	
Leaf necrosis	Macrophoma sp.	
Leaf spot	Alternaria euphorbiicola	
Leaf spot	Ascochyta sp.	
Leaf spot	Cercospora pulcherrima	
Leaf spot	Curvularia sp.	
Leaf spot	Drechslera sp.	
Leaf spot	Myrothecium roridum	
Leaf spot	Phyllosticta sp.	
Leaf spot	Syspastospora parasitica = Melanospora parasitica	
Leaf spot	Stemphylium sp.	
Mushroom root rot	Armillaria tabescens	
Powdery mildew	Erysiphaceae spp.	
Root rot	Phytophthora nicotianae = Phytophthora nicotianae var. parasitica	
Root rot	Pythium aphanidermatum	
Root rot	Pythium debaryanum	
Root rot	Pythium myriotylum	
Root rot	Pythium perniciosum	
Root rot	Pythium splendens	
Root rot	Pythium ultimum	
Root and stem rot	Thanatephorus cucumeris (Rhizoctonia solani anamorph)	
Rust	Puccinia sp.	
Rust	Uromyces euphorbiae = Uromyces proëminens var. poinsettiae	
Scab	Sphaceloma poinsettiae	
Stem gall	Nectriella pironii (Kutilakesa pironii anamorph)	
Stem rot	Botryosphaeria ribis	
Stem rot	Diplodia sp.	
Stem rot	Leptothyrium sp.	
Stem rot	Phoma sp.	
Stem rot	Phomopsis sp.	

== Nematodes, parasitic ==
Disease	Cause	Image
root-knot nematode	Meloidogyne spp.	

== Viral and viroid diseases ==
Disease	Cause	Image
mosaic	Euphorbia mosaic virus	
mosaic	Poinsettia mosaic virus	
(symptomless)	Poinsettia latent virus	

== Miscellaneous diseases and disorders ==
Miscellaneous diseases and disorders
Bleaching necrosis	Air pollutant injury from either chlorides (> 0.5 ppm), nitrogen dioxide (> 2-3 ppm) or sulfur dioxide (> 0.5 ppm)
Bract necrosis	Physiological disorder favored by high humidity, heavy watering and high (ammoniacal) fertility rates in the last 4 weeks of production
Chlorosis	Nitrogen deficiency producing a general foliar yellowing Molybdenum deficiency affecting mature young leaves and producing upward leaf roll Sulfur deficiency causing young leaf yellowing Zinc deficiency producing general yellowing and stunting of new leaves
Cyathia drop	Response to low light conditions, dryness and/or high temperatures at the end of the production cycle
Dropping (epinasty)	Ethylene toxicity (< 1 ppm) or low temperature chilling
Edema	Physiological
Interveinal chlorosis	Magnesium deficiency, initiating on older leaves Manganese deficiency, initiating on young mature leaves Ammonium toxicity produces V-shaped chlorotic bands starting at the leaf tip and accompanied by downward leaf cupping
Latex eruption	High internal turgor pressure associated with certain cultivars, high humidity, high moisture availability, low temperatures and/or mechanical abrasion
Leaf glazing (bronzing)	Peroxyacetyl nitrate (PAN) injury to the lower epidermis (> 0.2 ppm)
Marginal necrosis	Potassium deficiency Fluoride toxicity on tips and margins of young leaves and bracts (0.4 ppm in water); Lithium toxicity on older leaves (2 ppm)
Stem splitting	Physiological expression of flower initiation
Stippling	Ozone injury (> 4 ppm)
Terminal shoot necrosis	Excessive soluble salts (> 800 EC X 102)
White bract	Chilling injury occurring between 0–10 °C (32–50 °F)
