= Kottō Dōri =

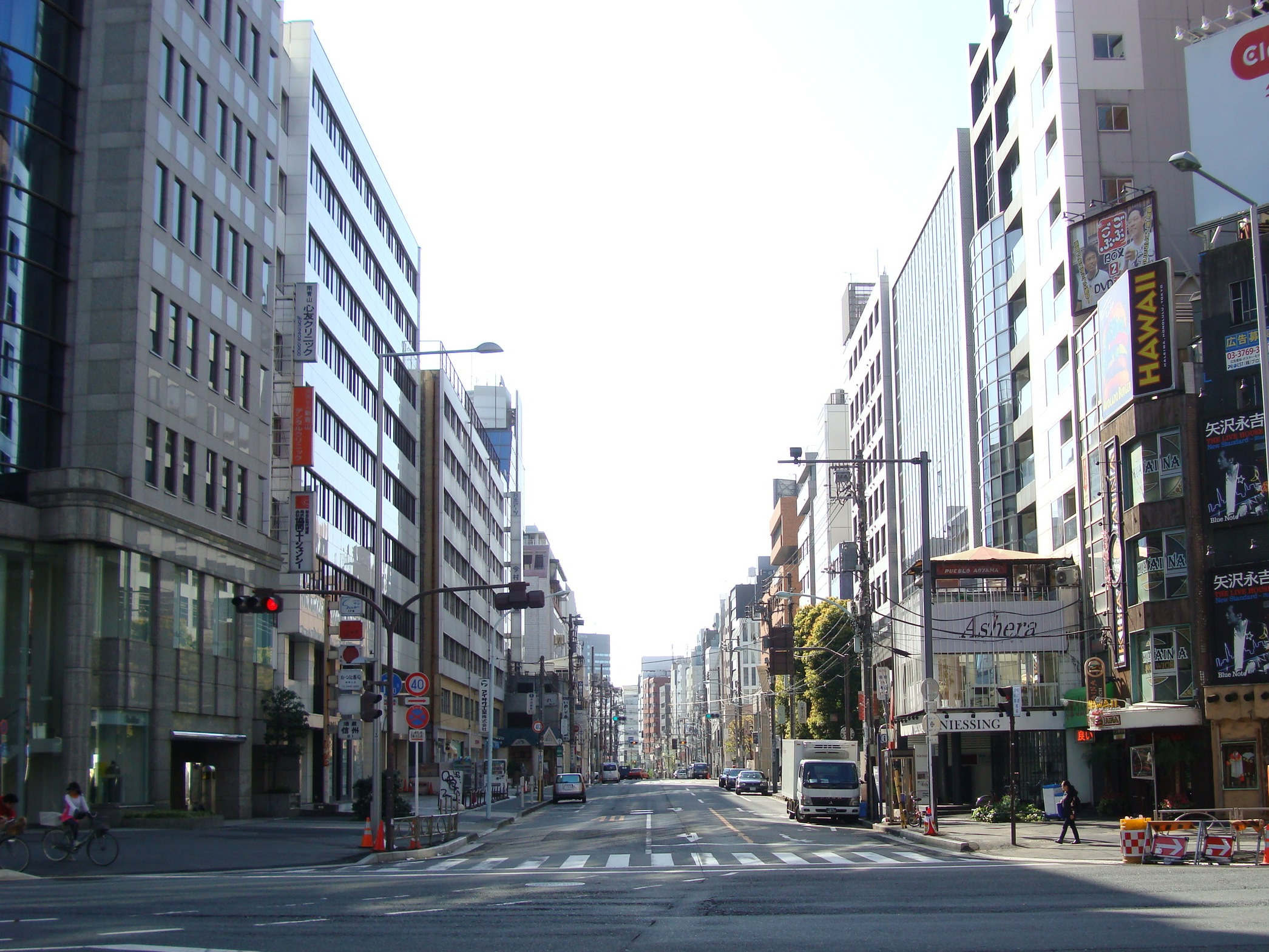
Kotto-dori (骨董通り)

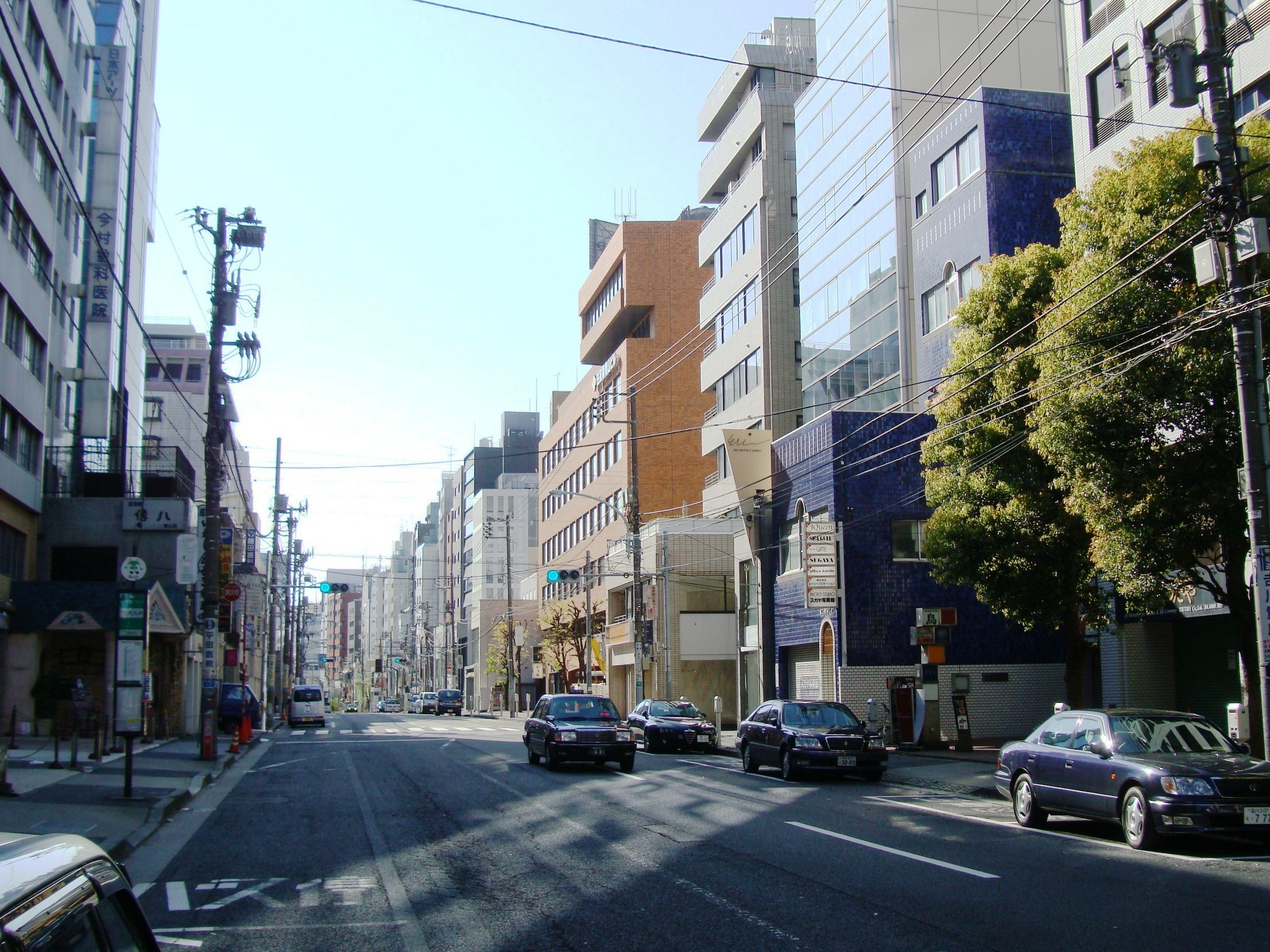
Kotto-dori

Kotto-dori (骨董通り lit. "Antique Street") is a street in Minami-Aoyama, Minato-ku, Tokyo, known for its antique shops and galleries.

The term is the common name for the road connecting the Minami-Aoyama 5-chome intersection on National Route 246 (Aoyama-dori) and the Takagi-cho intersection on Tokyo Metropolitan Route 412 (Kasumigaseki-Shibuya Line, Roppongi-dori). The entire road is designated as Tokyo Metropolitan Planning Road Auxiliary Route No. 23, and setbacks are particularly advanced on the Minami-Aoyama 5-chome intersection side.

It was formerly called "Takagicho-dori" (高樹町通り) or "Minamicho-dori" (南町通り) and was a streetcar line. Nezu Museum as well as a museum dedicated to beni are located on the street.
