= Puccinia verruca =

Scientific classification
- Domain: Eukaryota
- Kingdom: Fungi
- Division: Basidiomycota
- Class: Pucciniomycetes
- Order: Pucciniales
- Family: Pucciniaceae
- Genus: Puccinia
- Species: P. verruca

Binomial name
- Puccinia verruca Thüm. (1879)

Synonyms
- Leptopuccinia verruca (Thüm.) Syd., (1922); Micropuccinia verruca (Thüm.) Arthur & H.S. Jacks., (1921); Puccinia jaczewskii Tropova, (1930)

Species of fungus

Puccinia verruca is a plant pathogen that causes rust on safflower.

== See also ==
- List of Puccinia species
