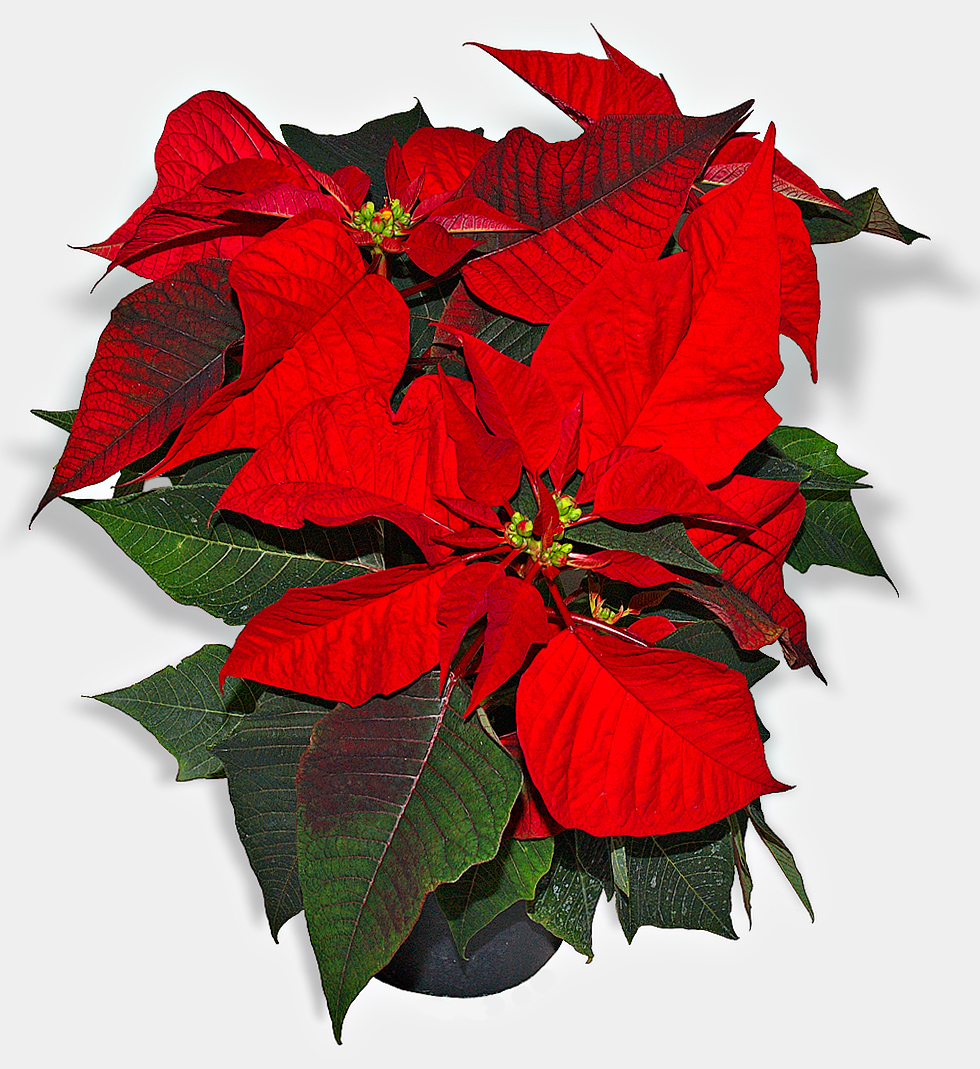

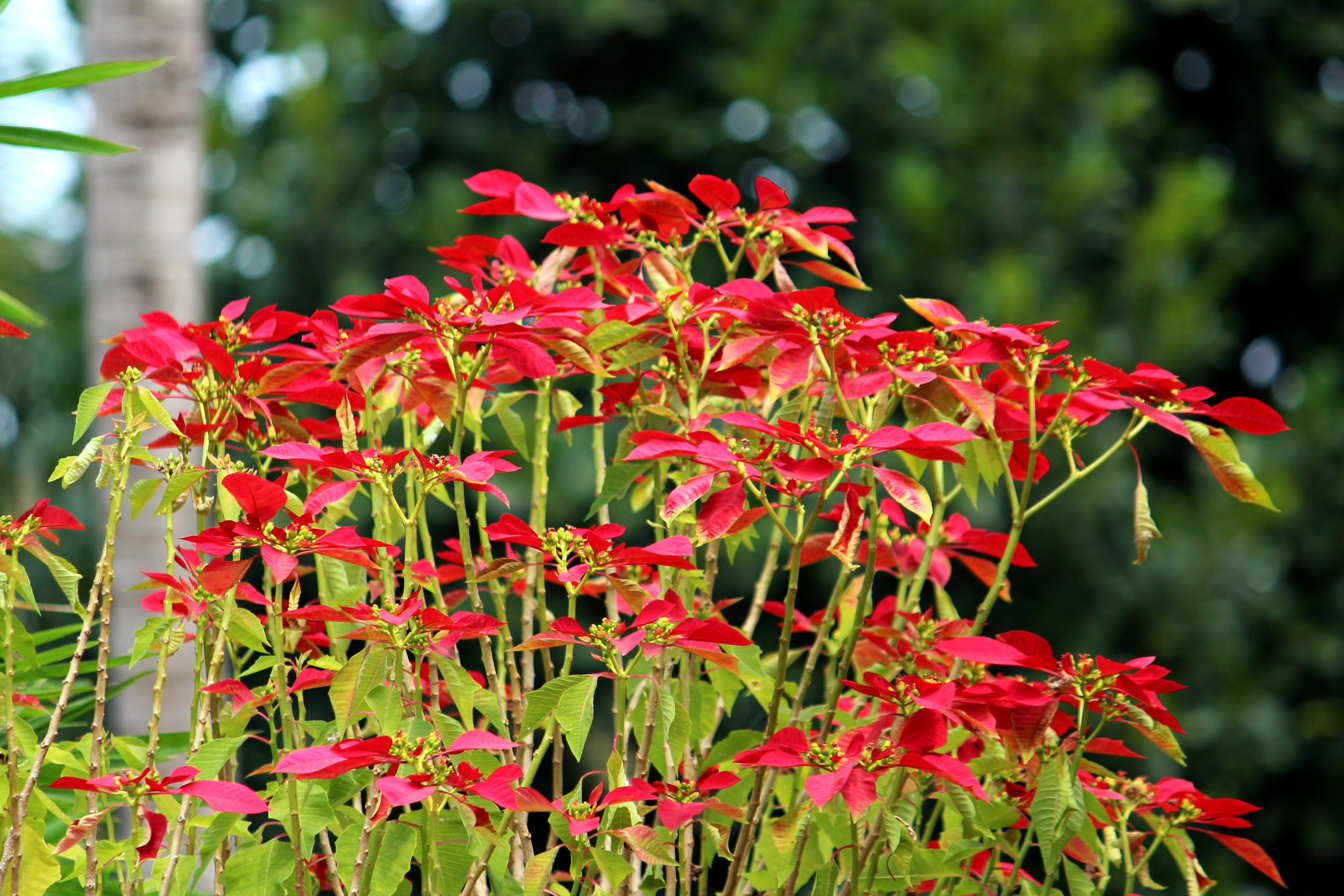

Scientific classification
- Kingdom: Plantae
- Clade: Tracheophytes
- Clade: Angiosperms
- Clade: Eudicots
- Clade: Rosids
- Order: Malpighiales
- Family: Euphorbiaceae
- Genus: Euphorbia
- Species: E. pulcherrima

Binomial name
- Euphorbia pulcherrima Willd. ex Klotzsch

= Poinsettia =

Species of flowering plant

The poinsettia (/pɔɪnˈsɛtiə/; Euphorbia pulcherrima) is a commercially important flowering plant species of the diverse spurge family Euphorbiaceae. Indigenous to Mexico and Central America, the poinsettia was first described by Europeans in 1834. It is particularly well known for its red and green foliage and is widely used in Christmas floral displays. It derives its common English name from Joel Roberts Poinsett, the first United States minister to Mexico, who is credited with introducing the plant to the US in the 1820s. Poinsettias are shrubs or small trees, with heights of 0.6 to 4 m (2.0 to 13.1 ft). Though often stated to be highly toxic, the poinsettia is not dangerous to pets or children. Exposure to the plant, even consumption, most often results in no effect, though it can cause nausea, vomiting, or diarrhea.

Wild poinsettias occur from Mexico to southern Guatemala, growing on mid-elevation, Pacific-facing slopes. One population in the Mexican state of Guerrero is much further inland, however, and is thought to be the ancestor of most cultivated populations. Wild poinsettia populations are highly fragmented, as their habitat is experiencing largely unregulated deforestation. They were cultivated by the Aztecs for use in traditional medicine. They became associated with the Christmas holiday and are popular seasonal decorations. Every year in the United States, approximately 70 million poinsettias of many cultivated varieties are sold in a six-week period. Many of these poinsettias are grown by Paul Ecke Ranch, which serves half the worldwide market and 70 percent of the US market.

== Taxonomy ==
The poinsettia was described as a new species in 1834 by the German scientist Johann Friedrich Klotzsch. Klotzsch credited Carl Ludwig Willdenow with the species name "pulcherrima", and the authority is given as Willd. ex Klotzsch. The holotype had been collected in Mexico during an 1803–1804 expedition by Alexander von Humboldt and Aimé Bonpland.

It was known by the common name "poinsettia" as early as 1836, derived from Joel Roberts Poinsett, a botanist and the first US Minister to Mexico. Possibly as early as 1826, Poinsett began sending poinsettias from Mexico back to his greenhouses in South Carolina. Prior to poinsettia, it was known as "Mexican flame flower" or "painted leaf". There have been recent efforts to rename the flower to its Nahuatl name, "cuetlaxōchitl", due to Poinsett's involvement in slavery and the Trail of Tears.

Poinsettias are known in Turkey as Atatürk çiçeği ("Atatürk flower"). The name originated from a spurious report by the newspaper Cumhuriyet, which claimed that while a professor was searching for a name for the newly introduced plant, another professor who had seen Mustafa Kemal Atatürk during his visit to the Talas American College in Kayseri suggested naming the flower Gazi Atatürk.

== Description ==
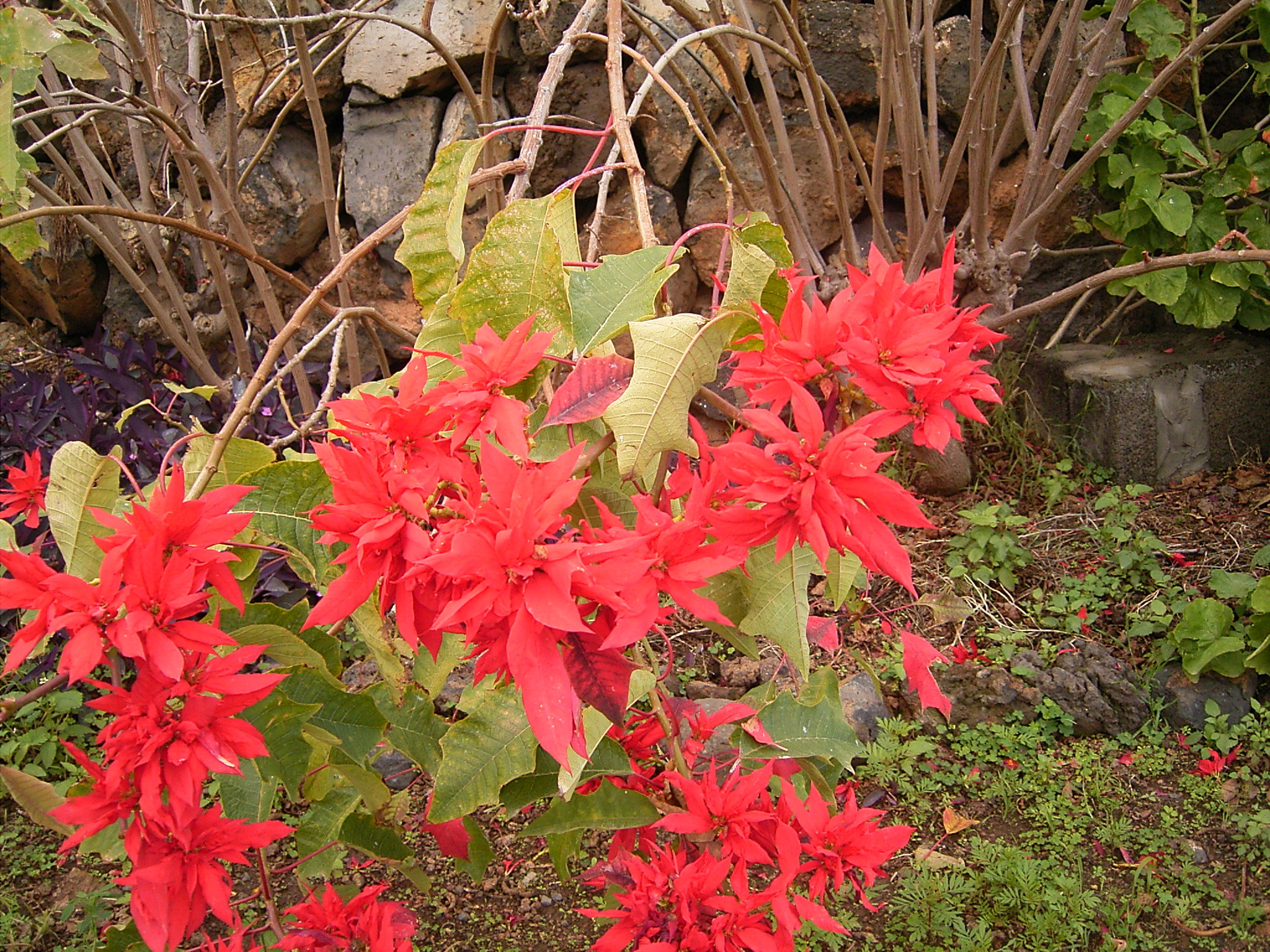
A full-grown specimen of E. pulcherrima

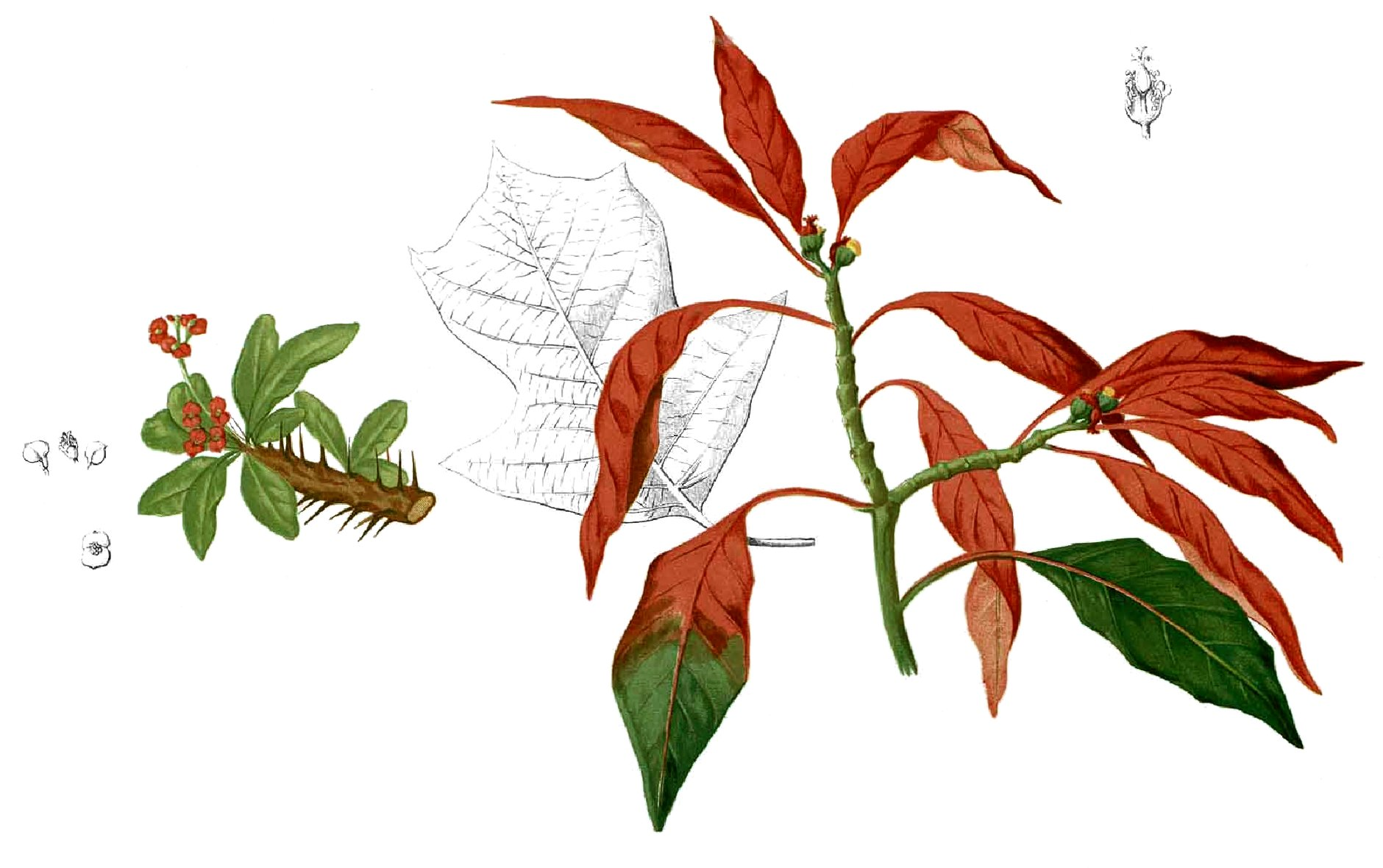
Scientific illustration of E. pulcherrima, ca. 1880

Euphorbia pulcherrima is a shrub or small tree, typically reaching a height of 0.6–4 metres (2–13 ft). The plant bears dark green dentate leaves that measure 6–16 centimetres (2.4–6.3 in) in length. The colored bracts—which are normally flaming red, with cultivars being orange, pale green, cream, pink, white, or marbled—are often mistaken for flower petals because of their groupings and colors, but are actually leaves. The colors of the bracts are created through photoperiodism, meaning that they require darkness (at least fourteen hours at a time for 6–8 weeks in a row) to change color. The plants also require abundant light during the day for the brightest color. Semi-evergreen, they generally lose most of their leaves during winter.

The flowers of the poinsettia are unassuming. They are grouped within the cyathia (small yellow structures found in the center of each leaf bunch, or false flowers). Nothing is known about pollination in wild poinsettias, though wasps are noted to occasionally visit the cyathia. All flowers in the Euphorbiaceae are unisexual (either male or female only), and they are often very small in size. In Euphorbia, the flowers are reduced even more and then aggregated into an inflorescence or cluster of flowers. Extrafloral nectaries in E. pulcherrima were first reported by Zimmerman in 1932.

== Toxicity ==
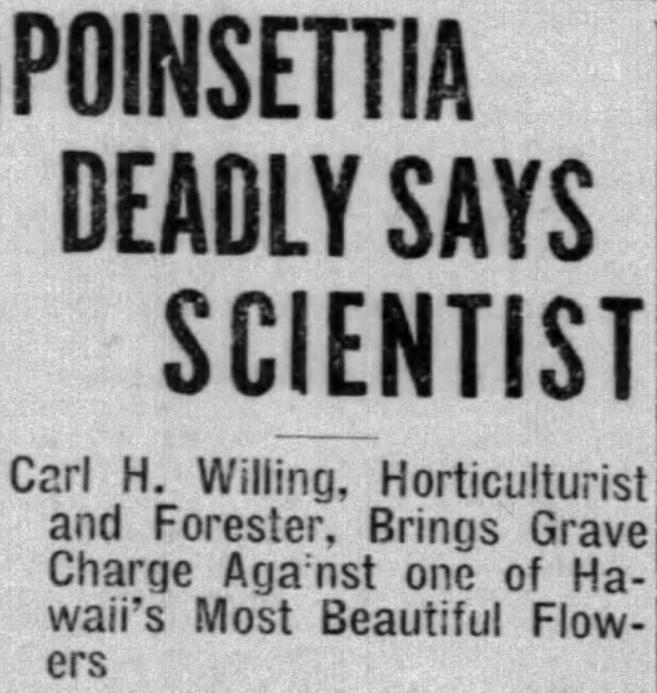
Newspaper headline from the Honolulu Star-Bulletin (1913) wrongly alleging that poinsettia is deadly

Poinsettias are popularly, though incorrectly, said to be toxic to humans and other animals. This misconception was spread by a 1919 urban legend of a two-year-old child dying after consuming a poinsettia leaf. In 1944, the plant was included in H. R. Arnold's book Poisonous Plants of Hawaii on this premise. Though Arnold later admitted that the story was hearsay and that poinsettias were not proven to be poisonous, the plant was thus thought deadly. In 1970 the US Food and Drug Administration published a newsletter stating erroneously that "one poinsettia leaf can kill a child", and in 1980 they were prohibited from nursing homes in a county in North Carolina due to this supposed toxicity.

An attempt to determine a poisonous dose of poinsettia to rats failed, even after reaching experimental doses equivalent to consuming 500 leaves, or nearly 1 kg (2.2 lb) of sap. Contact with any part of the plant by children or pets often has no effect, though it may cause nausea, diarrhea, or vomiting if swallowed. External exposure to the plant may result in a skin rash for some. A survey of more than 20,000 calls to the American Association of Poison Control Centers from 1985–1992 related to poinsettia exposure showed no fatalities. In 92.4% of calls, there was no effect from exposure, and in 3.4% of calls there were minor effects, defined as "minimally bothersome". Similarly, a cat's or dog's exposure to poinsettias rarely necessitates medical treatment. If ingested, mild drooling or vomiting can occur, or rarely, diarrhea. In rare cases, exposure to the eye may result in eye irritation. Skin exposure to the sap may cause itchiness, redness, or swelling. It can induce asthma and allergic rhinitis in certain groups of people.

== Chemical composition ==
Pulcherrol and pulcherryl acetate are among the components of its latex. Triterpenes are found in aerial parts of the plant, including its latex and leaves. One such triterpenoid skeleton is being investigated for its anti-Alzheimer's disease bioactivity.

== Range and habitat ==
The poinsettia occurs in North and Central America, from Mexico to southern Guatemala. Its range is about 2,000 km (1,200 mi) long, encompassing mid-elevation tropical dry forests. Most wild populations are on Pacific-facing slopes in steep canyons. Populations were once found in rolling hill areas, though many have gone extinct. It has been hypothesized that the inaccessibility of the canyons may protect the wild populations from human disturbance. There is a somewhat anomalous population of wild poinsettias in the northern part of the Mexican state of Guerrero and Oaxaca, which is much further inland in the hot and seasonally dry forests than the rest of the species' range. Genetic analyses showed that the wild populations in northern Guerrero are the likely ancestors of most cultivated poinsettias.

== Conservation ==
The tropical dry forests where wild poinsettias grow experience largely unregulated deforestation, resulting in habitat loss. Its natural habitat is thus highly fragmented, particularly near metropolitan areas such as Taxco. Population sizes are frequently very small, with as few as a dozen individuals. Populations can be up to several hundred individuals, but this is not typical. A conservation risk typical for species with wild and cultivated populations is the contamination of the wild gene pool by hybridization with cultivated individuals. This has not been documented in wild poinsettias, though, as cultivars seldom flower and do not produce fruits. As of 2012, wild poinsettias were not protected by Mexican law.

== In culture ==
Aztec people use the plant to produce red dye and as an antipyretic medication. In Nahuatl, the language of the Aztecs, the plant is called cuetlaxōchitl, meaning 'mortal flower that perishes and withers like all that is pure'. Or, by some other accounts, 'flower that grows in residues or soil' (lit. 'excrement flower'), because: "Birds would eat the seeds and deposit them somewhere, and so it seemed that the seeds would germinate and grow from bird droppings." Today it is known in Mexico and Guatemala as flor de nochebuena or simply nochebuena, meaning 'Christmas Eve flower'. In Spain it is known as flor de Pascua or Pascua, meaning 'Easter flower'. In Chile and Peru, the plant became known as the "crown of the Andes".

From the 17th century, friars of the Franciscan Christian religious order in Mexico included the plants in their Christmas celebrations. The star-shaped leaf pattern is said to symbolize the Star of Bethlehem, the red color represents the blood shed during the sacrifice of Jesus' crucifixion, and the white leaves represent the purity of Jesus.

Poinsettias are popular Christmas decorations in homes, churches, offices, and elsewhere across North America, as a result of an extensive marketing campaign by the Ecke family that began by shipping free poinsettias to television stations for use on-air. In the US, December 12 is National Poinsettia Day, marking the anniversary of Joel Roberts Poinsett's death.

== Cultivation ==
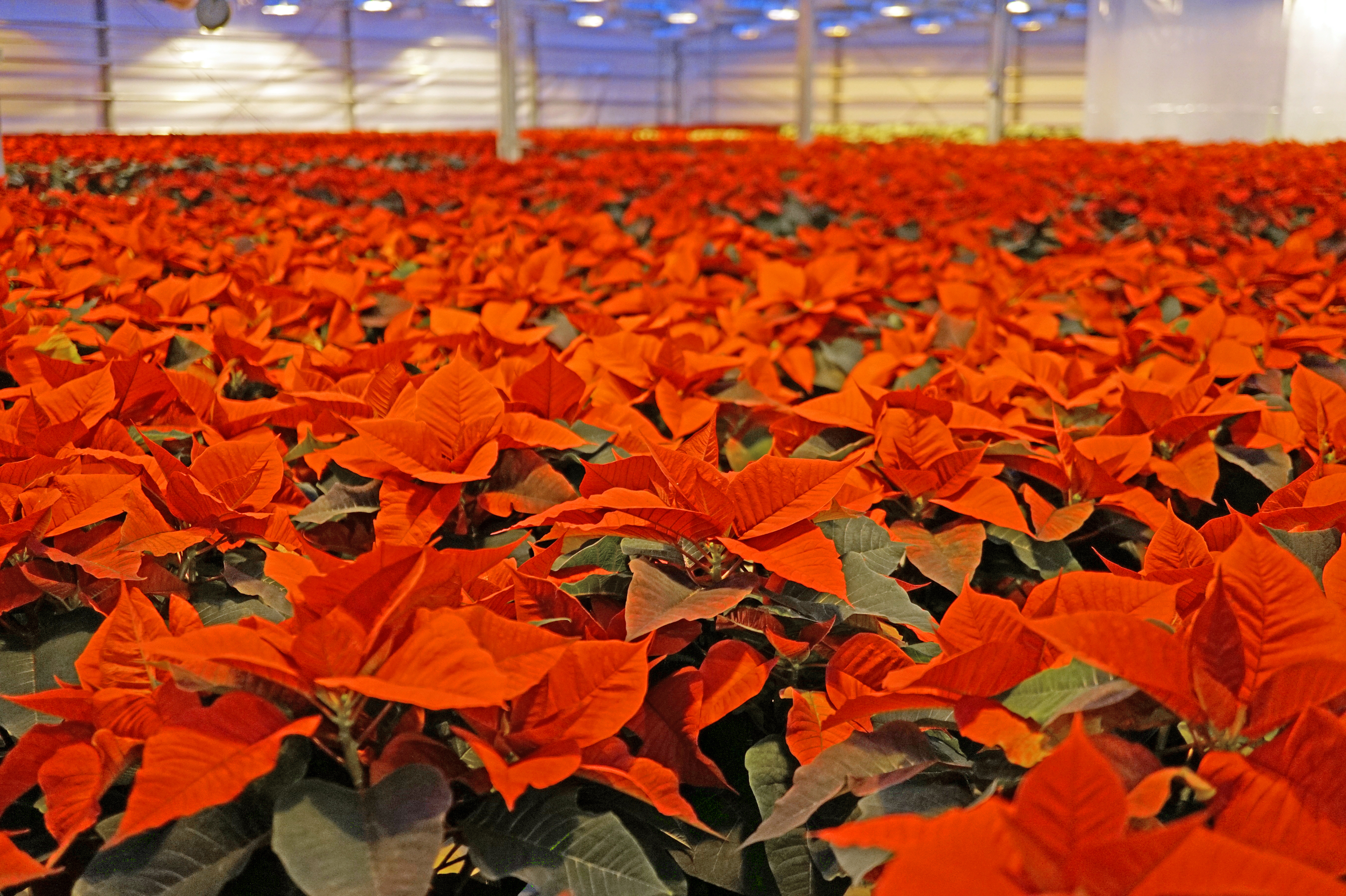
Euphorbia pulcherrima in Viherlandia

The Aztecs were the first to cultivate poinsettias. Cultivation in the US began when diplomat Joel Roberts Poinsett sent some of the plants back to his greenhouses in South Carolina in the 1820s. Specific details about its spread from there are largely unverifiable, but it was exhibited at the Pennsylvania Horticultural Society's 1829 Philadelphia Flower Show by Colonel Robert Carr. Carr described it as "a new Euphorbia with bright scarlet bracts or floral leaves, presented to the Bartram Collection by Mr. Poinsett, United States Minister of Mexico."

The poinsettia is the world's most economically important potted plant. Each year in the US, approximately 70 million poinsettias are sold in a period of six weeks, at a value of US$250 million. In Puerto Rico, where poinsettias are grown extensively in greenhouses, the industry is valued at $5 million annually. There are over 100 cultivated varieties of poinsettia that have been patented in the US.

To produce extra axillary buds that are necessary for plants containing multiple flowers, a phytoplasma infection—whose symptoms include the proliferation of axillary buds—is used. The discovery of the role phytoplasmas play in the growth of axillary buds is credited to Ing-Ming Lee of the USDA Agricultural Research Service.

=== American industry ===
Albert Ecke emigrated from Germany to Los Angeles in 1900, opening a dairy and orchard in the Eagle Rock area. He became intrigued by the plant and sold them from street stands. His son, Paul Ecke, developed the grafting technique, but it was the third generation of Eckes, Paul Ecke Jr., who was responsible for advancing the association between the plant and Christmas.

Besides changing the market from mature plants shipped by rail to cuttings sent by air, he sent free plants to television stations for them to display on air from Thanksgiving to Christmas. He also appeared on television programs like The Tonight Show and Bob Hope's Christmas specials to promote the plants.

Until the 1990s, the Ecke family, who had moved their operation to Encinitas, California, in 1923, had a virtual monopoly on poinsettias owing to a technique that made their plants much more attractive. They produced a fuller, more compact plant by grafting two varieties of poinsettia together. A poinsettia left to grow on its own will naturally take an open, somewhat weedy look. The Eckes' technique made it possible to get every seedling to branch, resulting in a bushier plant.

In the late 1980s, university researcher John Dole discovered the grafting method (grafting rarer densely-branched cultivars onto more common sparsely-branched cultivars) – previously known only to the Eckes – and published it. This allowed competitors to flourish, particularly those using low-cost labor in Latin America. The Ecke family's business, then led by Paul Ecke III, decided to stop producing plants in the US, but as of 2008, they still served about 70 percent of the domestic market and 50 percent of the worldwide market.

=== Diseases ===
Poinsettias are susceptible to several diseases, mostly fungal, but also bacterial and parasitic. Conditions that promote poinsettia propagation also favor certain diseases. Fungal diseases affecting greenhouse poinsettia operations include Pythium root rot, Rhizoctonia root and stem rot, black root rot, scab, powdery mildew, and Botrytis blight. Bacterial diseases include bacterial soft rot and bacterial canker, while a viral disease is Poinsettia mosaic virus. Infection by poinsettia branch-inducing phytoplasma is actually desirable, as it keeps the plants shorter with more flowers. It is the first known phytoplasma that has economically advantageous effects.

== Gallery ==
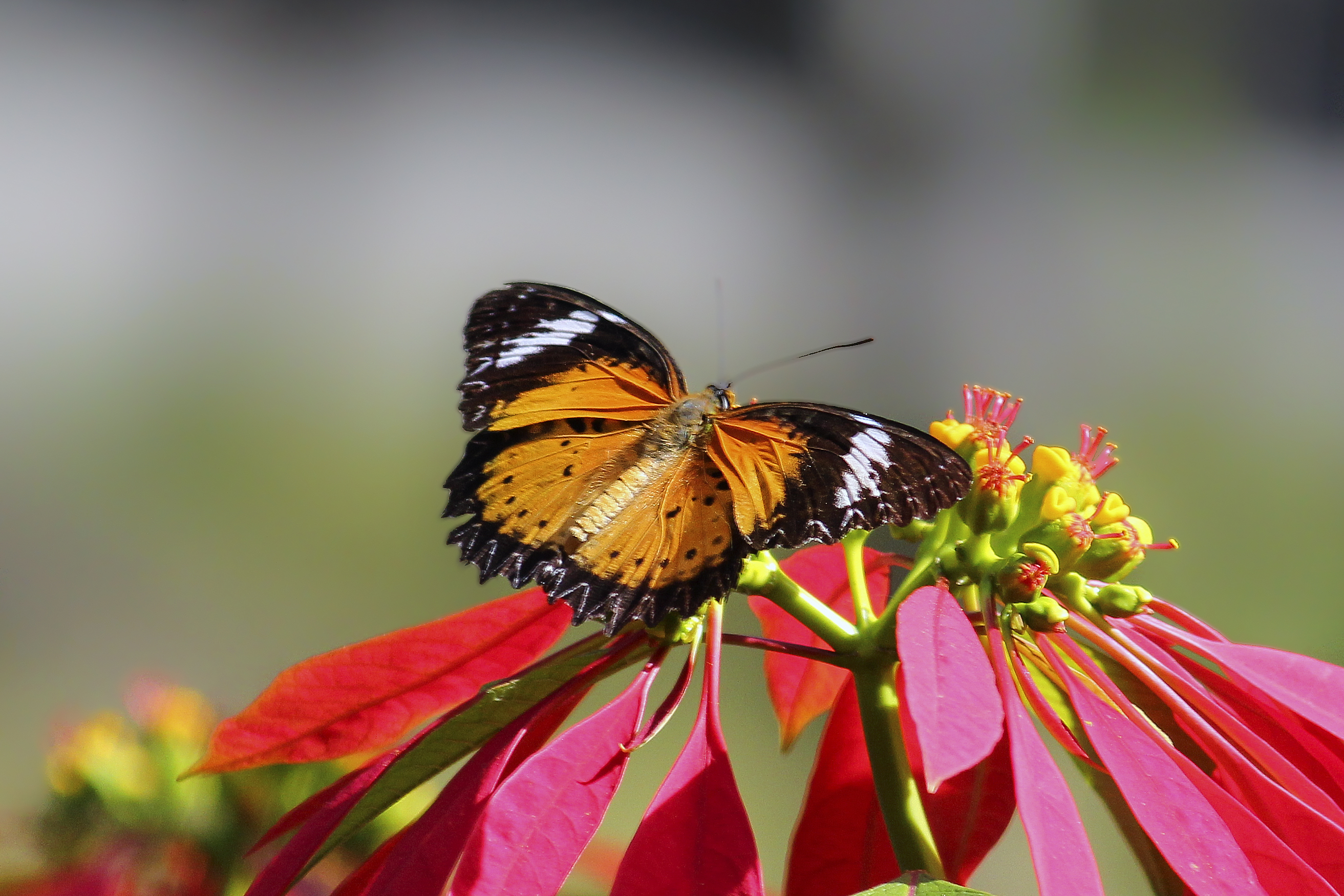
A male leopard lacewing butterfly landing on a poinsettia

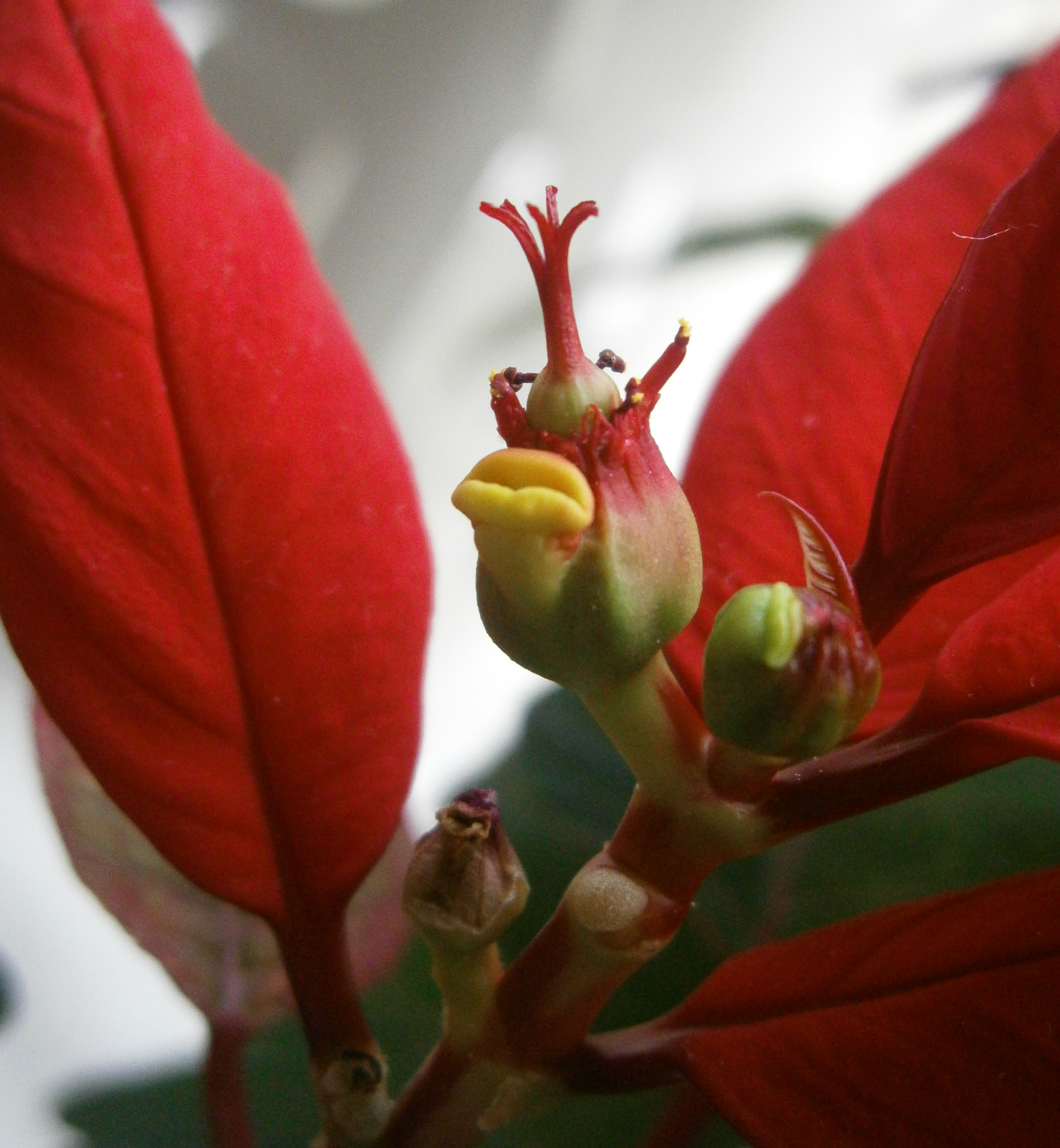
An inflorescence of the plant

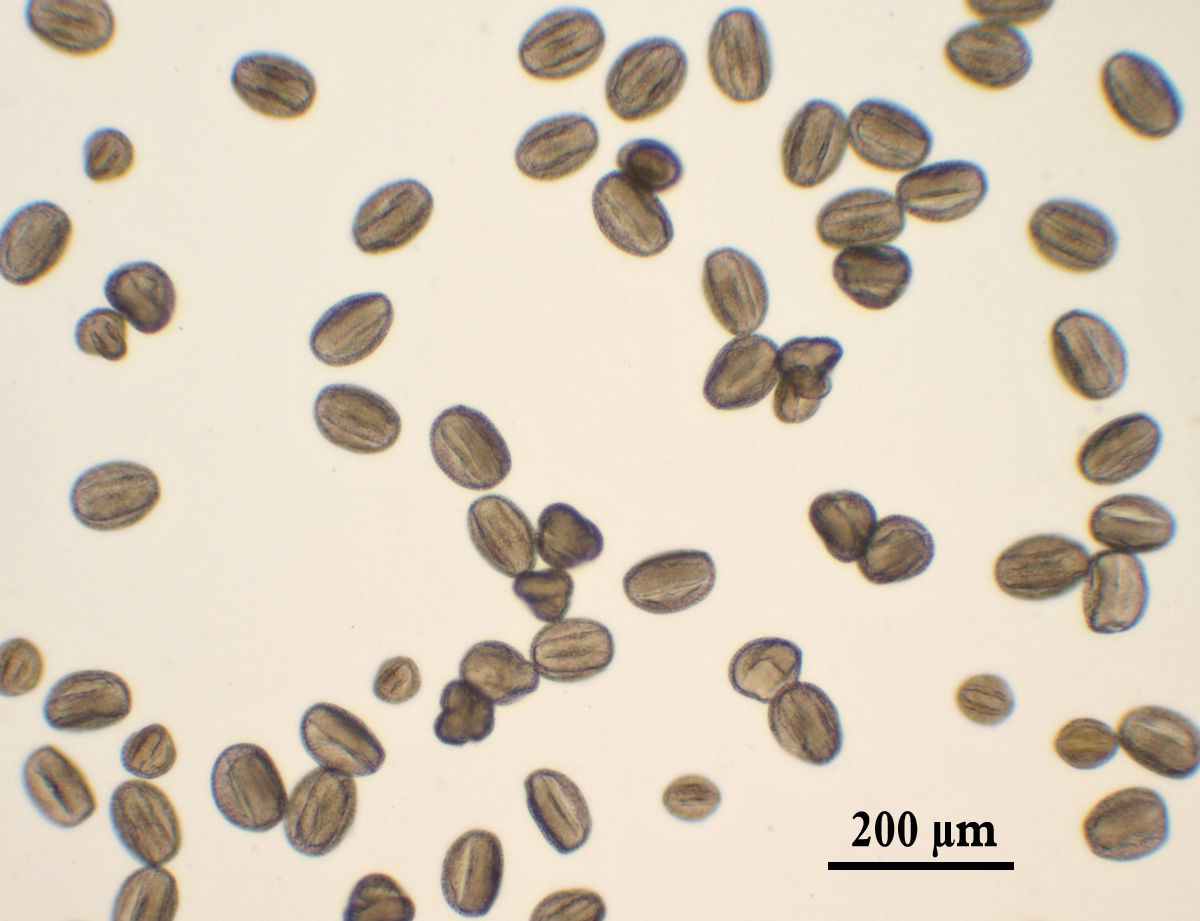
The pollen of the plant

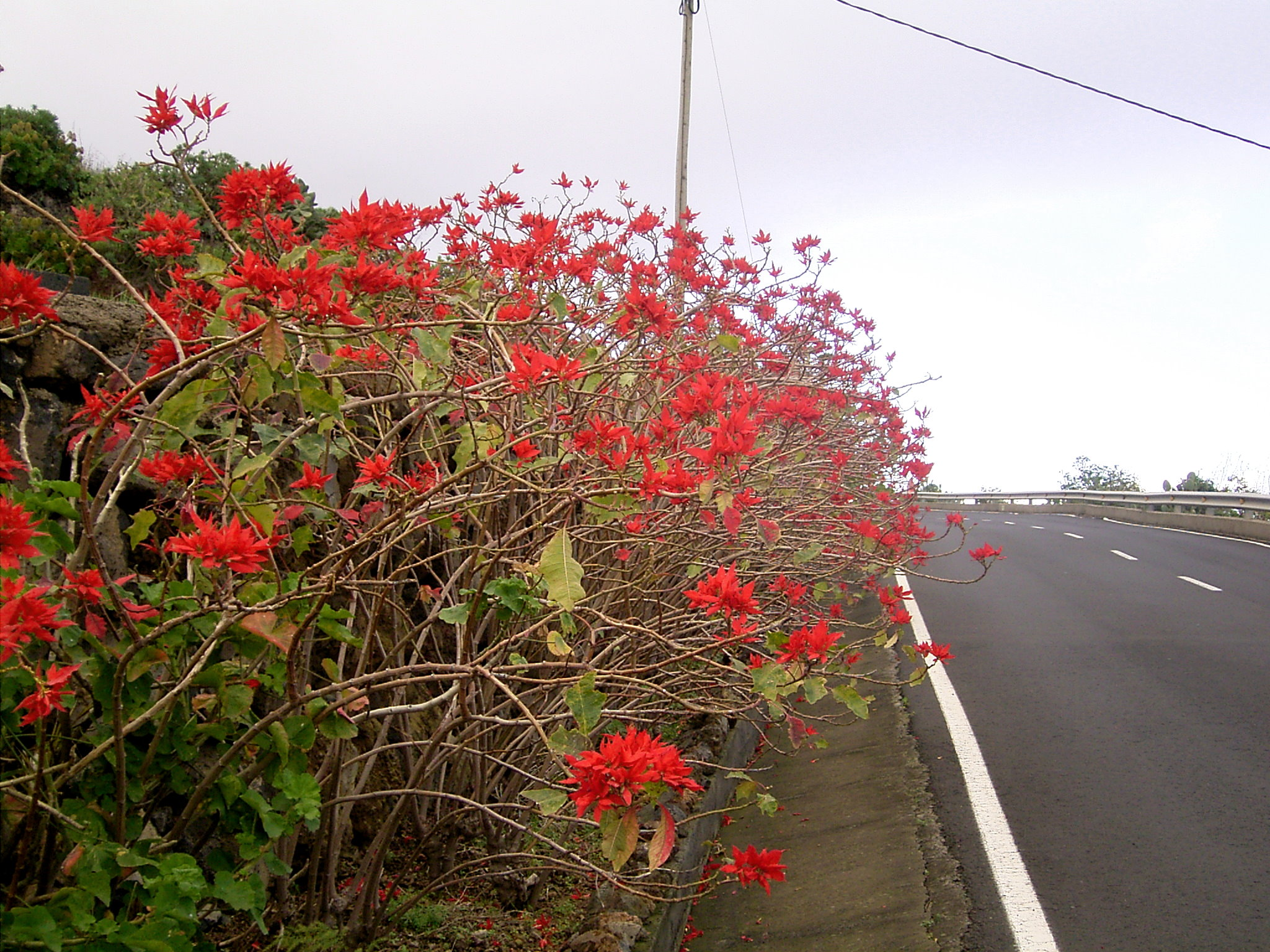
A hedge consisting primarily of poinsettias growing along a road in Barlovento, La Palma.

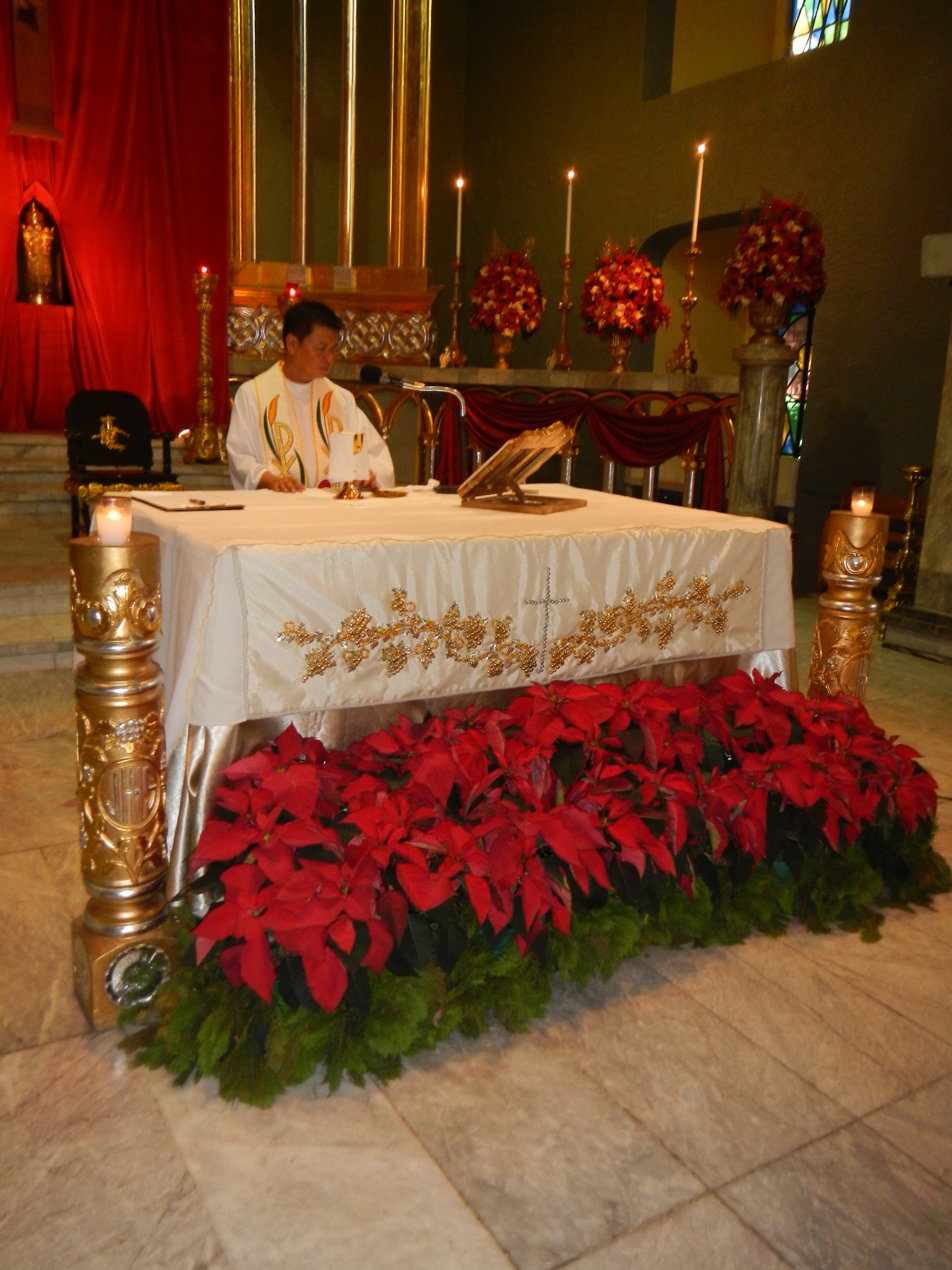
Poinsettias in a church in the Philippines

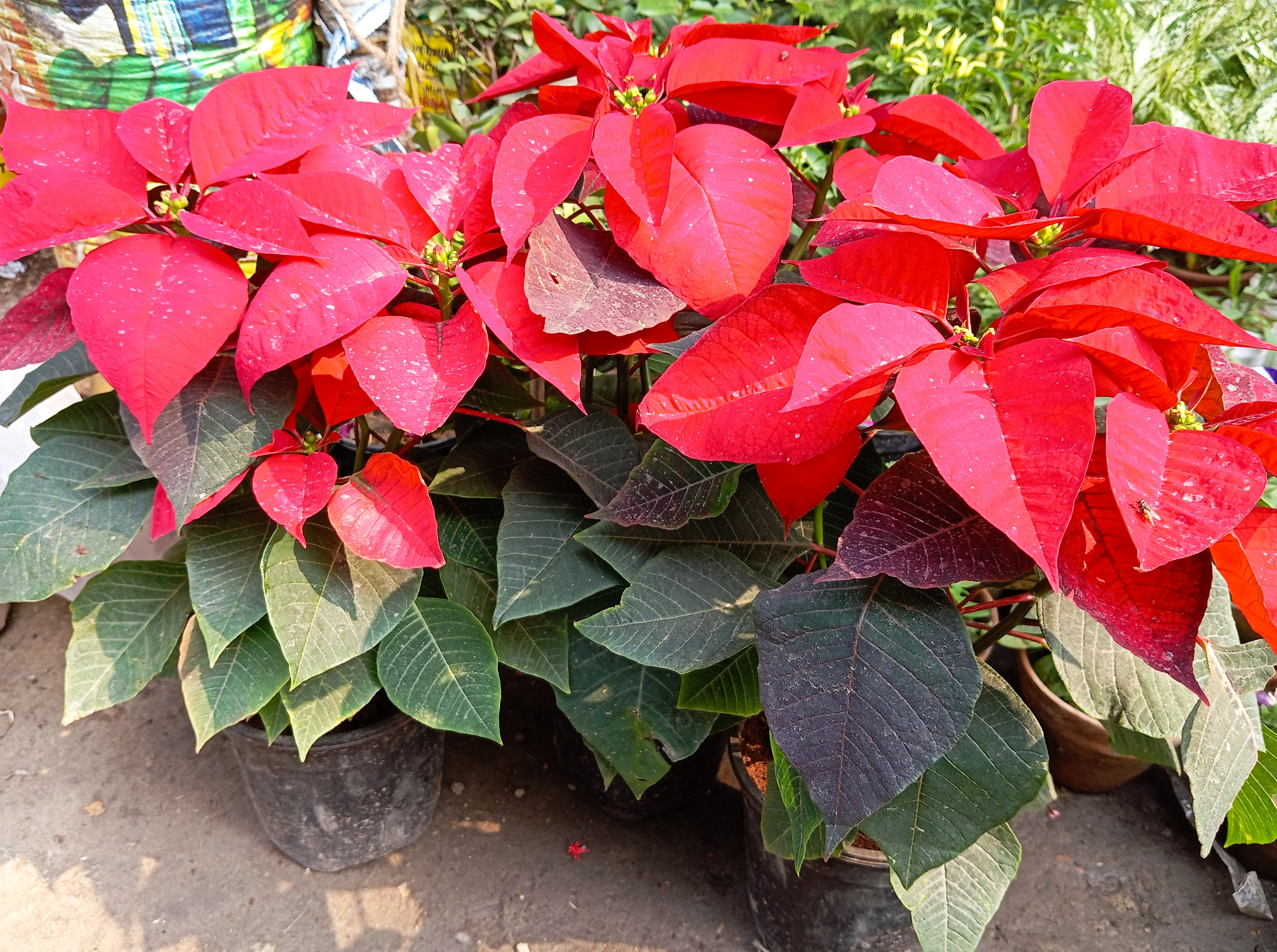
Poinsettia in Kolkata, West Bengal, India

== See also ==
- Christmas in Mexico
- Christmas plants
