= Uromyces proeminens var. poinsettiae =

Scientific classification
- Domain: Eukaryota
- Kingdom: Fungi
- Division: Basidiomycota
- Class: Pucciniomycetes
- Order: Pucciniales
- Family: Pucciniaceae
- Genus: Uromyces
- Species: U. proeminens
- Variety: U. p. var. poinsettiae

Trinomial name
- Uromyces proeminens var. poinsettiae (Tranzschel) Arthur

Species of fungus

Uromyces proeminens var. poinsettiae is a plant pathogen infecting poinsettias.
