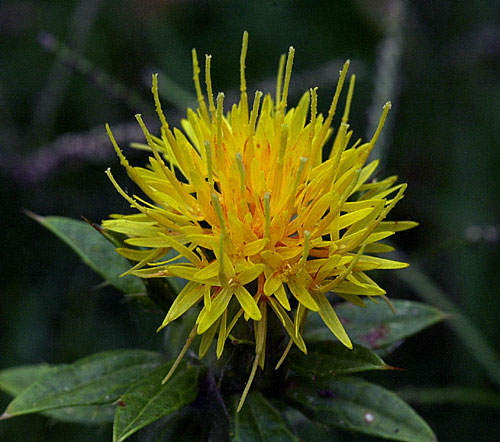

Scientific classification
- Kingdom: Plantae
- Clade: Tracheophytes
- Clade: Angiosperms
- Clade: Eudicots
- Clade: Asterids
- Order: Asterales
- Family: Asteraceae
- Genus: Carthamus
- Species: C. tinctorius

Binomial name
- Carthamus tinctorius L.

= Safflower =

Species of plant

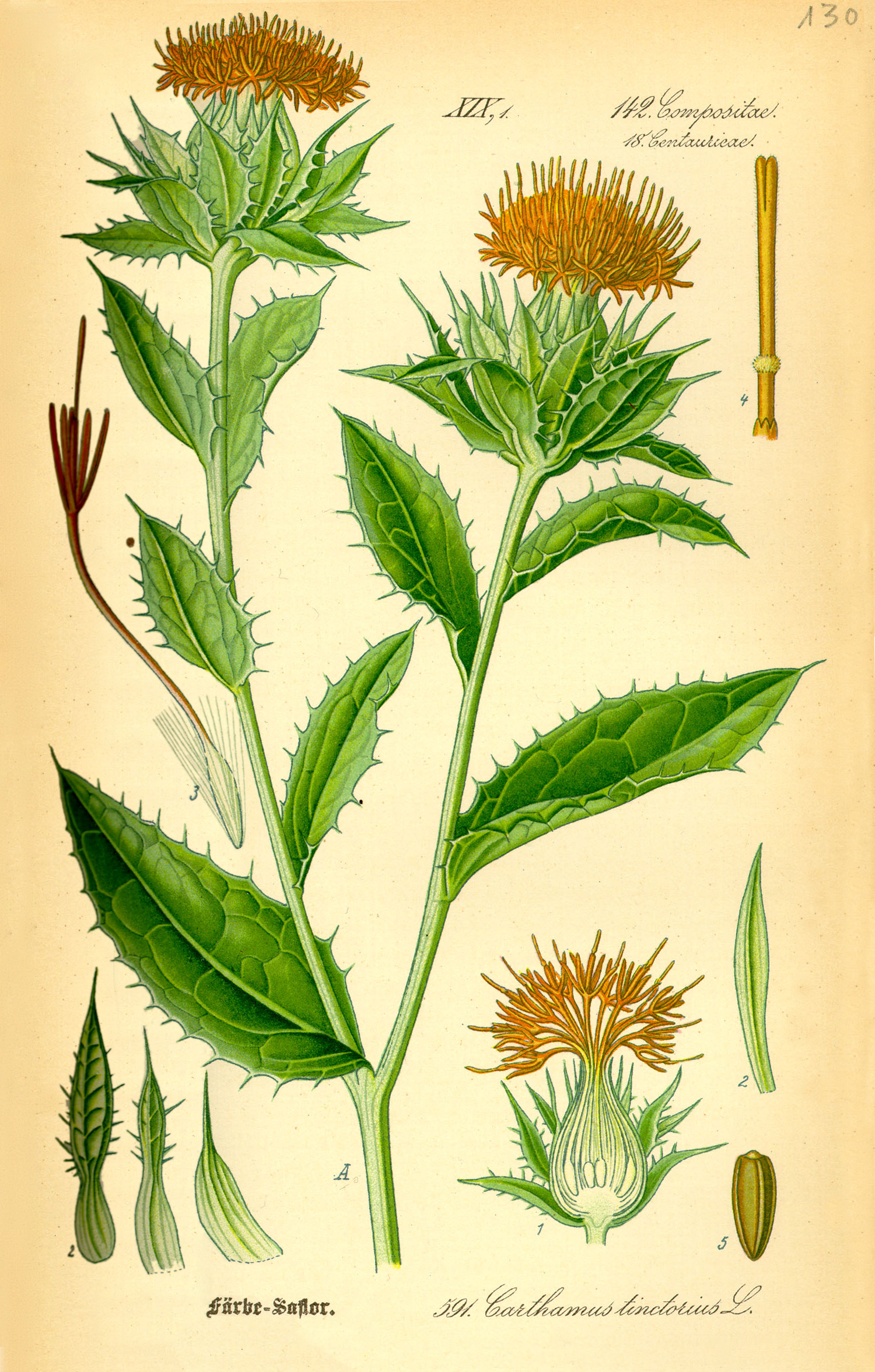
Carthamus tinctorius

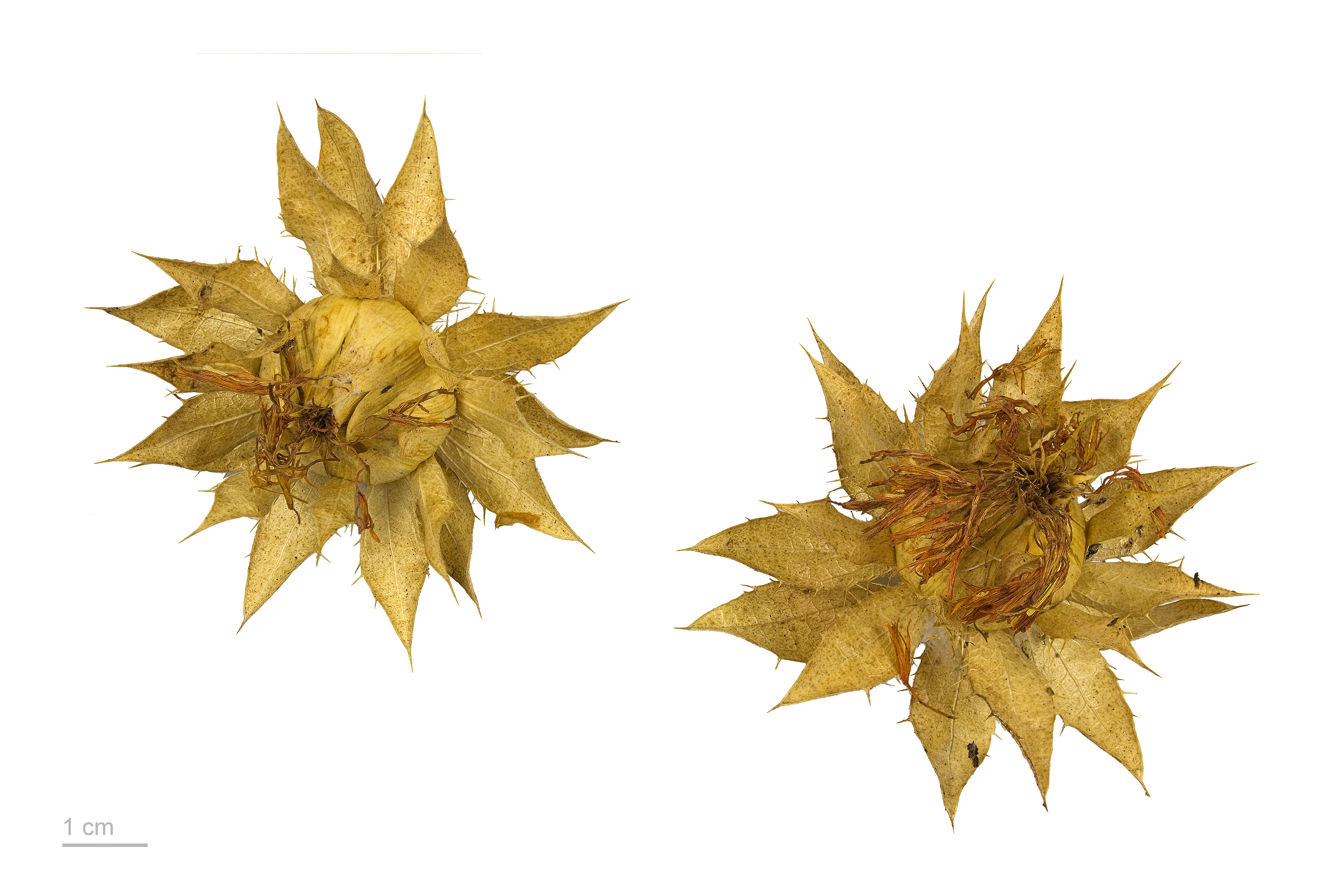
Carthamus tinctorius - MHNT

Safflower (Carthamus tinctorius), also false saffron, is a highly branched, herbaceous, thistle-like annual plant in the family Asteraceae. It is one of the world's oldest crops; today, it is commercially cultivated for vegetable oil extracted from the seeds. Plants are 30 to 150 cm (12 to 59 in) tall with globular flower heads having yellow, orange, or red flowers. Each branch will usually have from one to five flower heads containing 15 to 20 seeds per head. Safflower is native to arid environments having seasonal rain. It grows a deep taproot which enables it to thrive in such environments.

== Etymology ==
The word safflower is a borrowing from the Dutch, saffloer, German, safflor, and Old French, saffleur, having uncertain origin, though influenced by the words saffron and flower. The word was first used in English in the 16th century. An alternate common name is false saffron, indicating the resemblance of its flower petals to those of saffron.

== Biology ==
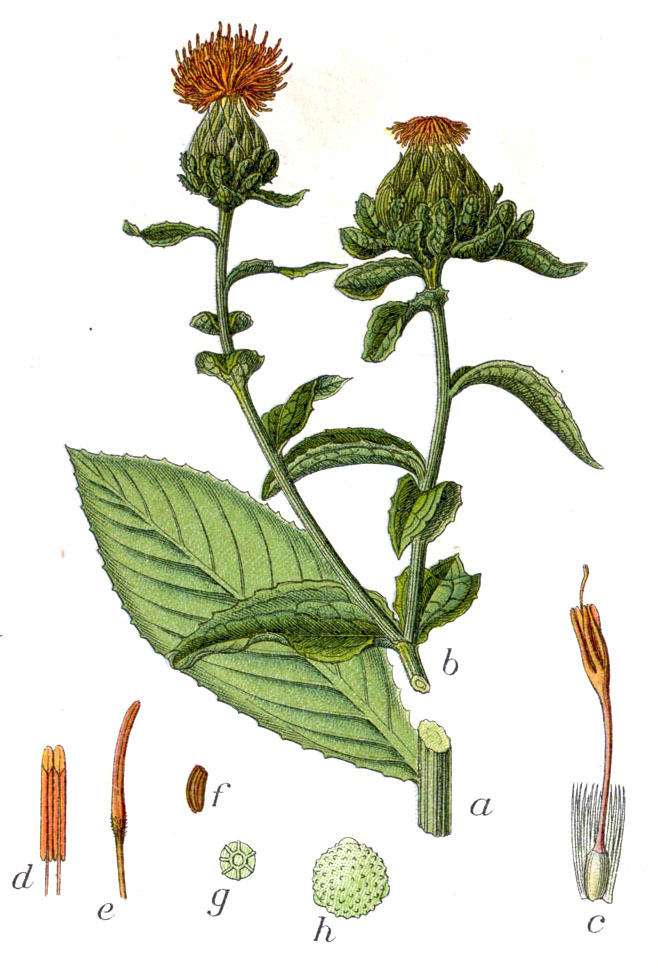
Safflower (Carthamus tinctorius), Illustration

=== Plant morphology ===
Safflower is a fast growing, erect, winter/spring-growing annual herb, that resembles a thistle. Originating from a leaf rosette emerges a branched central stem (also referred to as terminal stem), when day length and temperature increase. The main shoot reaches heights of 30–150 cm (10–60 in). The plant also develops a strong taproot, growing as deep as 2 m (6 ft 7 in). First lateral branches develop, once the main stem is about 20–40 cm (8–16 in) high. These lateral branches can then branch again to produce secondary and tertiary branches. The chosen variety as well as growing conditions influence the extent of branching.

The elongated and serrated leaves reach lengths of 10–15 cm (4–6 in) and widths of 2.5–5 cm (1–2 in) and run down the stem. The upper leaves that form the bracts are usually short, stiff and ovate, terminating in a spine. Buds are borne on the ends of branches, and each composite flower head (capitulum) contains 20–180 individual florets. Depending on variety, crop management and growing conditions, each plant can develop 3–50 or more flower heads of 1.25–4 cm (1/2–1 1/2 in) diameter. Flowering commences with terminal flower heads (central stem), followed sequentially by primary, secondary and sometimes tertiary branch flower heads. Individual florets usually flower for 3–4 days. Commercial varieties are largely self-pollinated. Flowers are commonly yellow, orange and red, but white and cream coloured forms exist. The dicarpelled, epigynous ovary forms the ovule. The safflower plant then produces achenes. Each flower head commonly contains 15–50 seeds; however, the number can exceed 100. The shell content of the seeds varies between 30 and 60%, while the oil content of the seeds varies between 20 and 40%.

=== Plant development ===
Safflower usually emerges 1–3 weeks after sowing and grows slower under low temperatures. Germination of safflower is epigeal. The first true leaves emerging form a rosette. This stage occurs in winter with short daylength and cold temperature, as the safflower can tolerate frosts up to −7 °C (19 °F) during the rosette stage.

When temperature and daylength start to increase, the central stem begins to elongate and branch, growing more rapidly. Early sowing allows more time for developing a large rosette and more extensive branching, which results in a higher yield.

Flowering is mainly influenced by daylength. The period from the end of flowering to maturity is usually 4 weeks. The total period from sowing to harvest maturity varies with variety, location, sowing time and growing conditions; for June or July sowings, it may be about 26–31 weeks.

Both wild and cultivated forms have a diploid set of 2n = 24 chromosomes. Crossings with Carthamus palaestinus, Carthamus oxyacanthus and Carthamus persicus can produce fertile offspring.

== History ==
Safflower is one of humanity's oldest crops. It was first cultivated in Mesopotamia, with archaeological traces possibly dating around 2500 BC.

Chemical analysis of ancient Egyptian textiles dated to the Twelfth Dynasty (1991–1802 BC) identified dyes made from safflower, and garlands made from safflowers were found in the tomb of the pharaoh Tutankhamun. John Chadwick reports that the Greek name for safflower (kárthamos, κάρθαμος) occurs many times in Linear B tablets, distinguished into two kinds: a white safflower (ka-na-ko re-u-ka, knākos leukā, κνάκος λευκά), which was measured, and red (ka-na-ko e-ru-ta-ra, knākos eruthrā, κνάκος ερυθρά) which was weighed. "The explanation is that there are two parts of the plant which can be used; the pale seeds and the red florets."

South India was a main exporter of safflower to China by the first millennium AD (or Han period) to which was surpassed by Java by early second millennium AD.

The early Spanish colonies along the Rio Grande in New Mexico used safflower as a substitute for saffron in traditional recipes. An heirloom variety originating in Corrales, New Mexico, called "Corrales Azafran", is still cultivated and used as a saffron substitute in New Mexican cuisine. Ishtori Haparchi in his 14th-century work Kaftor va-Ferach (Hebrew: כפתור ופרח) noted that the inhabitants of the Land of Israel in his time used Safflower to dye their food as a substitute for the saffron crocus (Crocus sativus).

== Cultivation ==
=== Climate ===
Safflower prefers high temperatures and grows best at 28–35 °C (82–95 °F). It tolerates 40 °C (104 °F), but there are also some varieties which grow under very low temperatures. Safflower is cultivated in different seasons: as a winter crop in south central India, as an early summer crop in California and as a mid-summer crop in the Northern Great Plains of the United States. Minimum length of the growing season is 120 and 200 days for summer and winter cultivars, respectively. Plant performance is highly dependent on the different planting dates in terms of temperature and day length. Winter hard varieties only form a rosette in late fall and elongates in spring. In early stages, safflower tolerates humidity but after bud stage the danger of a Botrytis blight infestation increases

Safflower is drought tolerant. The tap root makes moisture from deep soil layers available. Additionally, this tolerance can also be explained by the higher water use efficiency compared to other oil crops such as linseed and mustard. Shortly before and during maximum flowering water requirements are the highest. Beside drought tolerance, all parts of the plant are sensitive to moisture in terms of diseases. In the case of excessive water supply, it is susceptible to root rot. Therefore, many varieties are not suitable in irrigated agriculture especially on soils with danger of waterlogging.

Safflower tolerates wind and hail better than cereals. It stays erect and can retain the seeds in the head.

=== Soil ===
Safflower prefers well-drained, neutral, fertile and deep soils. It can adapt well to soil pH (pH 5–8) and tolerates salinity. Safflower can be well grown on different soil types, with water supply as its main driving factor for suitability, depending on climate and irrigation, and the resulting different water regimes of the different soil types. Therefore, cultivation on shallow soils and especially on soils with danger of waterlogging is not suitable. The deep rooting promotes water and air movement, due to its ability to utilize moisture from deep soil, and improves the soil quality for subsequent crops in a rotation.

Nutrient requirements can be compared to wheat and barley, except nitrogen amendment should be increased by 20%. Therefore, soils with an adequate nitrogen supply are favorable.

=== Agricultural practice ===
==== Crop rotation and sowing ====
Safflower is frequently grown in crop rotation with small grains, fallow and annual legumes. Close rotation with crops susceptible to Sclerotinia sclerotiorum (e.g. sunflower, canola, mustard plant and pea) should be avoided. A four-year rotation is recommended to reduce disease pressure.

Seeds should be sown in spring as early as 4.5 °C (40.1 °F) soil temperature is exceeded, to take advantage of the full growing season. If wireworms were a problem in the field in previous seasons, a respective seed treatment is recommended. A planting depth between 2.5 and 3.5 cm (0.98 and 1.38 in) is optimal. Shallow seeding promotes uniform emergence resulting in a better stand.

Seeding rate recommendations are around 17–33.5 kg/ha (15.2–29.9 lb/acre) of live seed. Where lower seeding rates promote branching, a longer flowering period and later maturity and higher rates promote thicker stands with a higher disease incidence. Sufficient moisture is necessary for germination. Usually, row spacing between 15 and 25 cm (5.9 and 9.8 in) are chosen using similar drill settings as recommended for barley.

==== Management ====
The total N recommendation is 90 kg/ha (80 lb/acre). This should include credits based on previous crops and soil available N. For the latter, deeper positioned nutrients need to be taken into account as safflower will root deeper than small grains and therefore access nutrients unavailable to them. Safflower growing in soils low in phosphorus need to be fertilized. Up to 39 kg/ha (35 lb/acre) of phosphate can be drill-applied safely.

A weed control program is essential when growing safflower as it is a poor competitor with weeds during the rosette stage. Cultivation on fields with heavy infestation of perennial weeds is not recommended.

==== Harvest ====
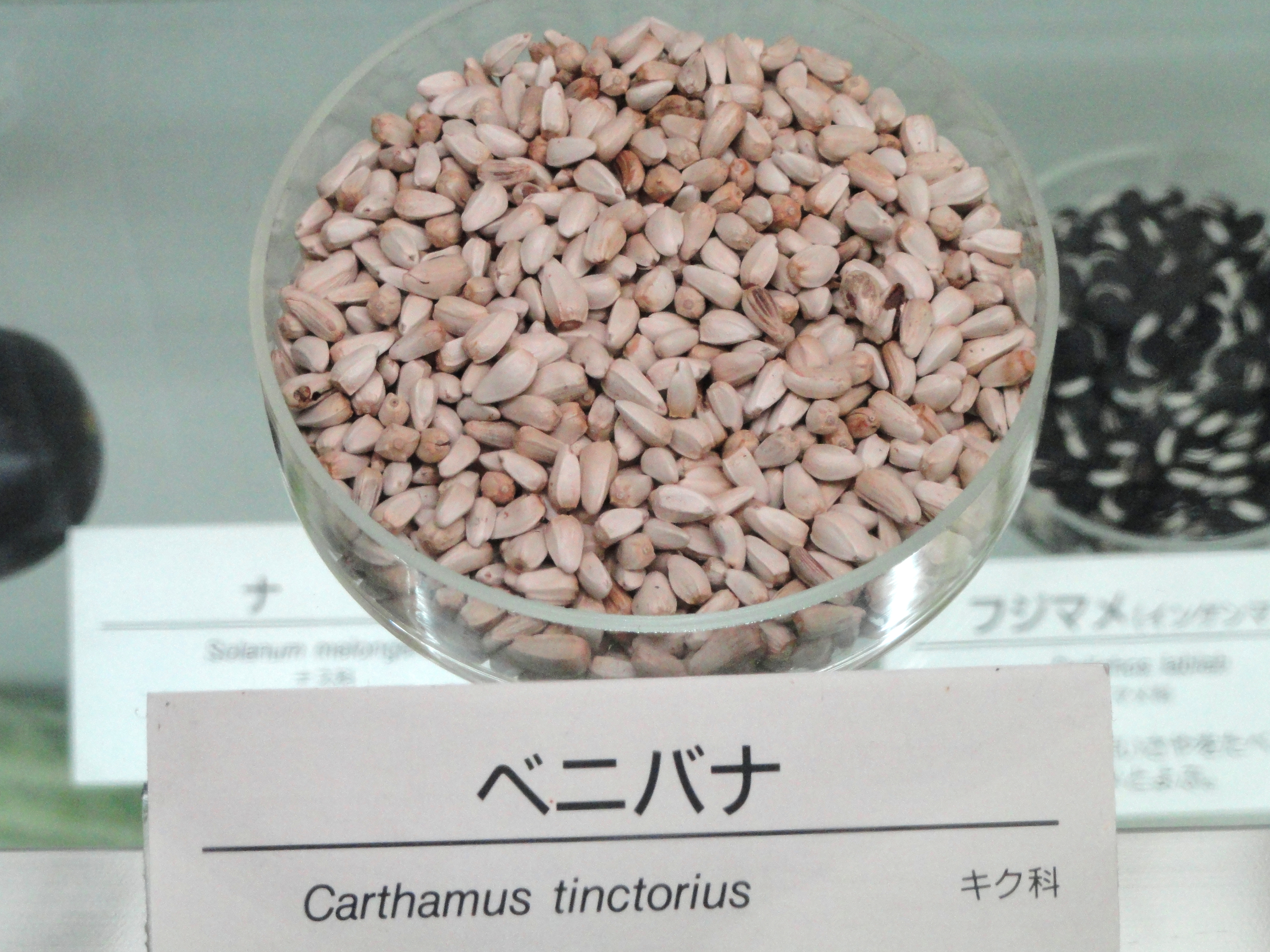
Safflower seeds

Safflower is mature when most leaves have turned brown approximately 30 days after flowering. Seeds should fall from the head when rubbed. Rain and high humidity after maturity may cause the seeds to sprout on the head.

Harvesting is usually done using a small-grain combine harvester. Moisture in seeds should not exceed 8% to allow for a safe, long-term storage. Drying can be done similar to sunflower. Temperatures must not exceed 43 °C (109 °F) to prevent damage to the seed and ensure quality.

=== Pests ===
- Gram pod borer/capsule borer: Helicoverpa armigera
- Safflower caterpillar: Perigaea capensis
- Safflower aphid: Uroleucon carthami
- Capsule fly/safflower bud fly: Acanthiophilus helianthi

=== Diseases ===
Alternaria spp. present one of the most prevalent diseases causing losses as high as 50% in India. In a field trial in Switzerland, Botrytis cinerea was the most prevalent disease.

Summary of plant diseases occurring on safflower without consideration of the geographical distribution and importance
Disease	Cause	Symptoms	Control
Bacterial diseases
Bacterial blight	Pseudomonas syringae	Dark, water soaked lesions on stems, leaf petioles and leaves. Red-brown necrotic spots on leaves. Severely infected plants die.	No control reported.
Stem soft rot	Erwinia carotovora	Wilting. Stems have a soft internal rot.	No control reported.
Fungal diseases
Alternia leaf spot	Alternaria carthami	Seeds may rot or seedlings damp off. Brown spots on the cotyledons. If stem is infected plant collapses.	Disease free seeds, fungicide treatment of seeds, resistant cultivar, hot water treatment of the seeds.
Botrytis head rot	Botrytis cinerea	Seed heads change color from a dark to light green followed by complete browning. Infected floral parts will be covered with a gray mold.	No control reported.
Cercospora leaf spot	Cercospora carthami	At any stage of growth. Commonly round spots on lower leaves.	No control necessary.
Colletrichum stem rot	Colletrichum orbiculare	Brown lesions, which can become necrotic occurring on the base of stems. Plant may die.	No control necessary.
Fusarium wilt	Fusarium oxysporum	Yellowing leaves at one side of the plant beginning on the lower leaves followed by wilting. Young plants may die.	Don't plant seeds from affected plants, fungicide treatment of seeds, rotation, resistant cultivar
Phytophtora root rot	Phytophtora cryptogea, P. drechsleri, P. cactorum	At any stage of growth. Lower stems of seedlings collapse. On older plants leaves turn light green or yellow, then wilt and die.	Resistant cultivar, provide good drainage, avoid ponding of water
Powdery mildew	Golovinomyces montagnei, Phyllactinia lappae	Greyish (Golovinomyces) or thicker whitish (Phyllactinia) mycelium on leaf surfaces.	No control reported.
Pythium root rot	Pythium spp.	Hypocotyl and first internode become water-soaked and soft with light brown discoloration. Later plant collapses	Fungicide treatment of seeds, avoid irrigation
Ramularia leaf spot	Ramularia carthami	Round and regular spots in both sides of leaves. Yield and seed quality is affected.	Rotation
Rhizocotina blight	Rhizocotina solani	Dark cortical lesions in the seedling stem. In advanced stages disease lesions extend up the stem. Root development is reduced	Resistant cultivar
Rust	Puccinia carthami	Can occur at seedling phase or at foliage phase.	Fungicide treatment of seeds, rotation, plow under residue, resistant cultivar
Sclerotinia stem rot	Sclerotinia sclerotiorum	Leaves turn yellow, wilt, turn brown and shrivel. White cottony growth on the stem. Can also affect heads. Plant may die.	Don't plant safflower with other plants susceptible to S. sclerotiorum.
Verticillium wilt	Verticillium wilt	At any stage of growth. Leaves turn darker green than those of healthy plants. In older plants on lower leaves first. Unilateral leaf growth. Chlorotic areas on leaves.	Normally minor disease. Do not rotate with cotton, peanuts and other susceptible crops.
Mycoplasmal diseases
Safflower phyllody	Safflower phyllody mycoplasma	Abnormal axillary budding.	Keep safflower fields free of the weed Carthamus tenuis L. because the leafhopper (vector) breeds in this weed
Viral diseases
Chilli mosaic	Chilli mosaic virus CMV	Light and dark green patches are scattered over leaves	No control reported.
Cucumber mosaic		Light and dark green mosaic pattern primarily on upper leaves	No control reported.
Severe mosaic	Turnip mosaic virus (TuMV)	Stunted plants with reduced leaf and seed head size. Seed ovules rot.	No control reported.
Tobacco mosaic	Tobacco mosaic virus (TMV)	Blotchy light and dark green mosaic patterns on leaves.	No control reported.

== Production ==
Safflower seed production 2023, tonnes
Kazakhstan	242,172
Russia	137,957
India	90,002
Mexico	65,760
United States	59,230
World	723,875
Source: FAOSTAT of the United Nations

In 2023, world production of safflower seeds was 723,875 tonnes, led by Kazakhstan with 33% of the total, and Russia and India as secondary producers (table).

Production of safflower seeds

Safflower seed yield

== Uses ==
Traditionally, the crop was grown for its seeds. It was also used for coloring and flavoring foods, in medicines, and making red (carthamin) and yellow dyes, especially before cheaper aniline dyes became available.

=== Safflower oil ===
For the last 50 years or so, the plant has been cultivated mainly for the vegetable oil extracted from its seeds. Safflower seed oil is flavorless and colorless, although this is dependent upon the exact method of oil extraction and the cultivar of the safflower. It is used mainly in cosmetics and as a cooking oil, in salad dressing, and for the production of margarine. INCI nomenclature is Carthamus tinctorius.

There are two types of safflower that produce different kinds of oil: one high in monounsaturated fatty acid (oleic acid) and the other high in polyunsaturated fatty acid (linoleic acid). Currently the predominant edible oil market is for the former, which is lower in saturated fats than olive oil. The latter is used in painting in the place of linseed oil, particularly with white paints, as it does not have the yellow tint which linseed oil possesses.

In one review of small clinical trials, safflower oil consumption reduced blood low-density lipoprotein levels – a risk factor for cardiovascular diseases – more than those seen from butter or lard consumption.

Nutrient value per 100g of high-linoleic safflower seed oil
		Min	Max
Saturated fatty acids	Myristic C14:0	0	0.5
Saturated fatty acids	Palmitic C16:0	4	8.6
Saturated fatty acids	Stearic C18:0	1.7	2.6
Monounsaturated fatty acids	Oleic C18:1	8.1	18.4
Monounsaturated fatty acids	Eicosenoic C20:1	0	0.2
Polyunsaturated fatty acids	Linoleic C18:2	71.6	83.7
Polyunsaturated fatty acids	Arachidonic C20:4	0	0.4
Polyunsaturated fatty acids	Linolenic C18:3	0	0.1

Fatty acid composition of high-oleic safflower seed oil
		%
Saturated fatty acids	Palmitic C16:0	~5
Saturated fatty acids	Stearic C18:0	~2
Monounsaturated fatty acids	Oleic C18:1	~78
Polyunsaturated fatty acids	Linoleic C18:2	~13

Per capita production of safflower oil

Production of safflower oil

=== Flowers for human consumption ===
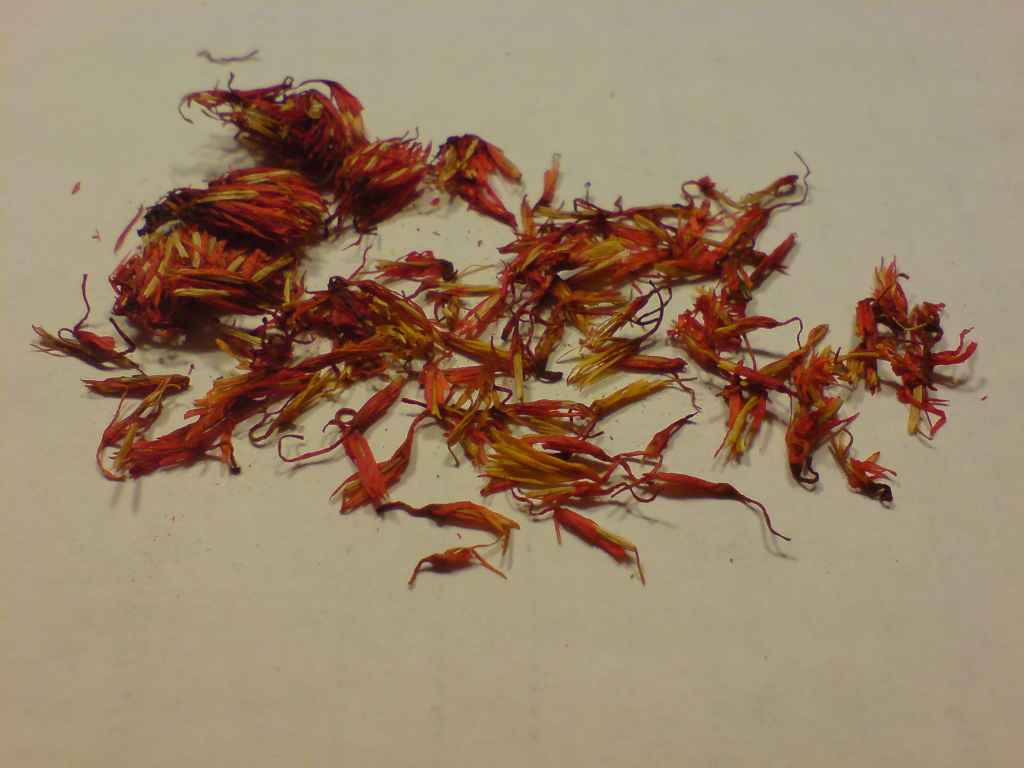
Safflower at a market

Safflower flowers are occasionally used in cooking as a cheaper substitute for saffron, sometimes referred to as "bastard saffron".

The dried safflower petals are also used as a herbal tea variety.

=== Dye from flowers ===
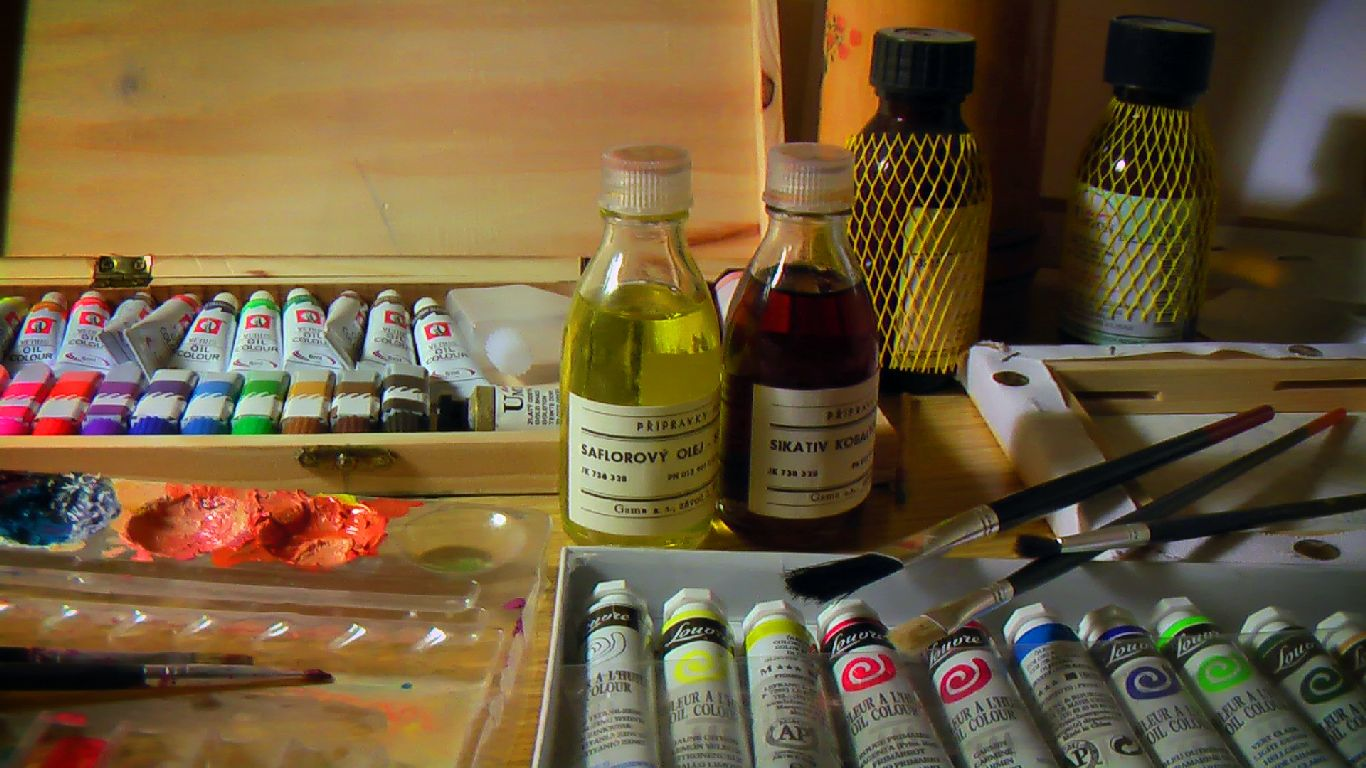
Safflower oil as a medium for oil paints

Safflower petals contain one red and two yellow dyes. In coloring textiles, dried safflower flowers are used as a natural dye source for the orange-red pigment carthamin. Carthamin is also known, in the dye industry, as Carthamus Red or C.I Natural Red 26 (CICN 75140). Yellow dye from safflower is known as Carthamus yellow or C.I Natural Yellow 5 (CICN -751405). One of the yellow pigments is fugitive and will wash away in cold water. The dye is suitable for cotton, which takes up the red dye, and silk, which takes up the yellow and red color yielding orange. No mordant is required. Due to the expensive nature of the dye, safflower dye was sometimes diluted with other dyestuffs, such as turmeric and sappan.

=== Biodegradable oil ===
In Australia in 2005, CSIRO and Grains Research and Development Corporation launched the Crop Biofactories initiative to produce 93% oleic oil for use as a biodegradable oil for lubricants, hydraulic fluids, and transformer oils, and as a feedstock for biopolymers and surfactants.

=== Insulin ===
Canadian biotechnology company SemBioSys Genetics created a process to extract an insulin bioequivalent to humulin from genetically modified safflower seeds. SemBioSys projected the insulin would reach the market in 2012. However, the company announced its closure in May of that year.

=== Beta-casein ===
Safflower has been genetically engineered to produce bovine beta-casein, a major casein protein in cow's milk. The approach is being developed as a form of plant molecular farming for the production of dairy proteins from the safflower seeds.

== See also ==
- Conjugated linoleic acid
- Suetsumuhana
- Tsheringma
