= Ecke Ranch =

American florist

- Formerly: Paul Ecke Ranch
- Type: Privately held company
- Industry: Horticulture
- Founded: 1909
- Founder: Albert Ecke
- Defunct: 2012
- Fate: Acquired
- Successor: Dümmen Orange
- Headquarters: Encinitas, California, U.S.
- Products: Poinsettias
- Owner: Dümmen Group
- Website: ecke.com at the Wayback Machine (archived February 9, 2014)

Ecke Ranch was an American horticultural company headquartered in Encinitas, California, with production facilities in Guatemala. By 2012, Ecke had grown to become the world's largest poinsettia (christmas star) producer with 50% market share.

It was acquired by Dutch Agribio Group in 2012, which later merged with German plant cultivation business Dümmen Group.

== History ==
German emigrant Albert Ecke began cultivating poinsettias in Eagle Rock, Los Angeles in 1909. Paul Ecke Jr. took over the family business in 1963 and expanded it heavily. Paul Ecke III took over Ecke Ranch in 1992 and started the business in Guatemala. Over the years, Ecke donated substantial money to the Encinitas Union School District. He also donated 92 acres of property to the North Coast Family YMCA, Quail Botanical Gardens and the California Department of Parks and Recreation for a beach park in Carlsbad, California.

In August 2012 it was announced that the company would be sold by the Ecke family to the Dutch Agribio Group. The regional Leichtag Foundation received a purchase option for the Encinitas, California location, which was implemented in May 2013. Paul Ecke III withdrew from the company after the sale, but it continued to be run under the Ecke brand for a time.

In February 2013, it was announced that Agribio would merge with German company Dümmen Group. The family-run Dümmen Group is the European market leader for poinsettia cuttings and young plants as well as one of the most important in the field of bedding and balcony plants. The merger was completed by April 2013, with the combined company operating as the DNA Green Group with headquarters in De Lier, Netherlands. The company was re-branded to Dümmen Orange in 2015.
