= Alternaria carthami =

Scientific classification
- Kingdom: Fungi
- Division: Ascomycota
- Class: Dothideomycetes
- Order: Pleosporales
- Family: Pleosporaceae
- Genus: Alternaria
- Species: A. carthami

Binomial name
- Alternaria carthami S. Chowdhury, (1944)

Synonyms
- Macrosporium carthami Savul., (1943)

Species of fungus

Alternaria carthami is a necrotrophic plant pathogen of safflower (Carthamus tinctorius L.). The fungus is in the order Pleosporales and family Pleosporaceae. It was first isolated in India, has spread globally and can have devastating effects on safflower yield, and resultant oilseed production. A. carthami is known to be seed-borne and appears as irregular brown lesions on safflower leaves and stems.

== Description ==
=== Morphology ===
A. carthami is known to have septate hyphae and exhibits only an asexual phase. In this phase, the fungus will produce unbranched conidiophores and conidia that develop singly or in chains. These conidia are large, brown, and both longitudinally and transversely septate with a long beak. Although A. carthami has only been shown to reproduce asexually, it still has a relatively high genetic variation between strains. This could hint at possible asexual recombination or a high rate of mutation.

=== Virulence factors ===
It has been found that A. carthami produces phytotoxins to assist in its pathogenic lifecycle. While it produces several phytotoxins, the most prevalent in the disease cycle is brefeldin A. Brefeldin A is capable of inhibiting phytoalexin synthesis used in the safflower's chemical defense against pathogens. A. carthami also produces varying degrees of cell wall degrading enzymes. Different individual strains in a singular geographic region have shown highly variable numbers of these enzymes and, therefore, variation in virulence.

== Ecology ==
A. carthami is a necrotrophic pathogen (feeding on the dead tissues of plants they have killed) of safflower that only produces an anamorph. Conidia production is optimized in rainy, humid conditions with moderate temperatures (25-30 °C).

=== Infection lifecycle ===
Conidia first land on the surface of the safflower plant. The conidia then germinate and the mycelium enters the plant to grow both inter- and intracellularly. Phytotoxins are released to induce cell death and wilting in safflower leaves. As seeds develop in the plant, A. carthami invades and infects them, able to penetrate into the embryo. Conidiophores then burst through the stomata and epidermis of the plant. Spores are disseminated through wind and rain and mycelium is carried within the newly developed seeds. Spores then land on neighboring plants and germinate, or the infected seeds are planted to colonize seedlings.

== Habitat and distribution ==
A. carthami is necrotrophically parasitic on leaves, stems, and seeds of safflower. The fungus has the ability to infect other plants, but it is very limited in this and has only been shown to fully colonize safflower. The fungus also thrives in moist, humid environments.

A. carthami has been found in all safflower-producing countries in the world. These countries are located across all continents (except Antarctica) including India, Australia, USA, Israel, Russia, East Africa, Canada, Mexico, Brazil, Ethiopia, Germany, Italy, Kenya, New Zealand, Pakistan, Romania, Spain, Tanzania, Zambia, Zimbabwe. This cosmopolitan nature is likely due to infected seeds being shared globally among safflower farmers.

== Pathology ==
A. carthami is known commonly as the leaf blight of safflower. This pathogen can lead to severe crop loss with a decrease in yield of up to 90% depending on how optimal conditions are for conidiophore growth. The preference of the fungus for humid, moist environments has limited safflower commercial cultivation to hot and arid parts of the world in order to slow fungal growth.

The fungus can infect safflower in all growth stages and is seen through brown lesions on the plant body, most prominently on the leaves. Lesions are typically first seen on seedling cotyledons and hypocotyls. These small spots will turn into larger irregular concentric rings on mature leaves and can begin to discolor the stem as well. These lesions are usually bigger than the actual colonized area due to phytotoxin production killing surrounding plant cells. Infection of the safflower seeds also negatively impacts seedling emergence and growth. This seed infection can go unnoticed as the surface of the seed can remain intact and healthy in appearance while the fungus has colonized the seed embryo. The pathogen can also spread very rapidly after seedling emergence in the field.

Due to the global sharing of safflower seeds as well as local dissemination of spores by wind and rain, A. carthami exhibits high genetic and virulence variation in one area, meaning it does not exhibit geographically isolated strains. This wide variety of virulence can put many strains of safflower at risk and can be catastrophic to crop yield.

=== Management ===
Many commercially available chemical fungicides are unable to fully eradicate A. carthami in safflower seeds due to the internal infection.

Bioagents (including fungal and bacterial) have also been tested in vitro to determine how they affect mycelial growth.

Antifungal plant extracts are also being tested as a management option against A. carthami as an alternative to environmentally harmful chemicals. Different options tested include extracts from Garlic (Allium sativum), Ginger (Zingiber officinale), Eucalyptus, Neem (Azadirachta indica), Datura (Datura metel), Turmeric (Curcuma longa) and several others. Solutions containing garlic extracts or Datura extracts were found to cause the most inhibition.

Resistant plant breeds have also been a source of interest against safflower leaf blight. Artificial breeding selection for resistance has been largely unsuccessful, however, there are promising results through in vitro methods. Through culturing safflower on callus that had been exposed to A. carthami toxins, researchers were able to grow resistant plants. This method is still not perfect, however, and results mostly in partial resistance.
