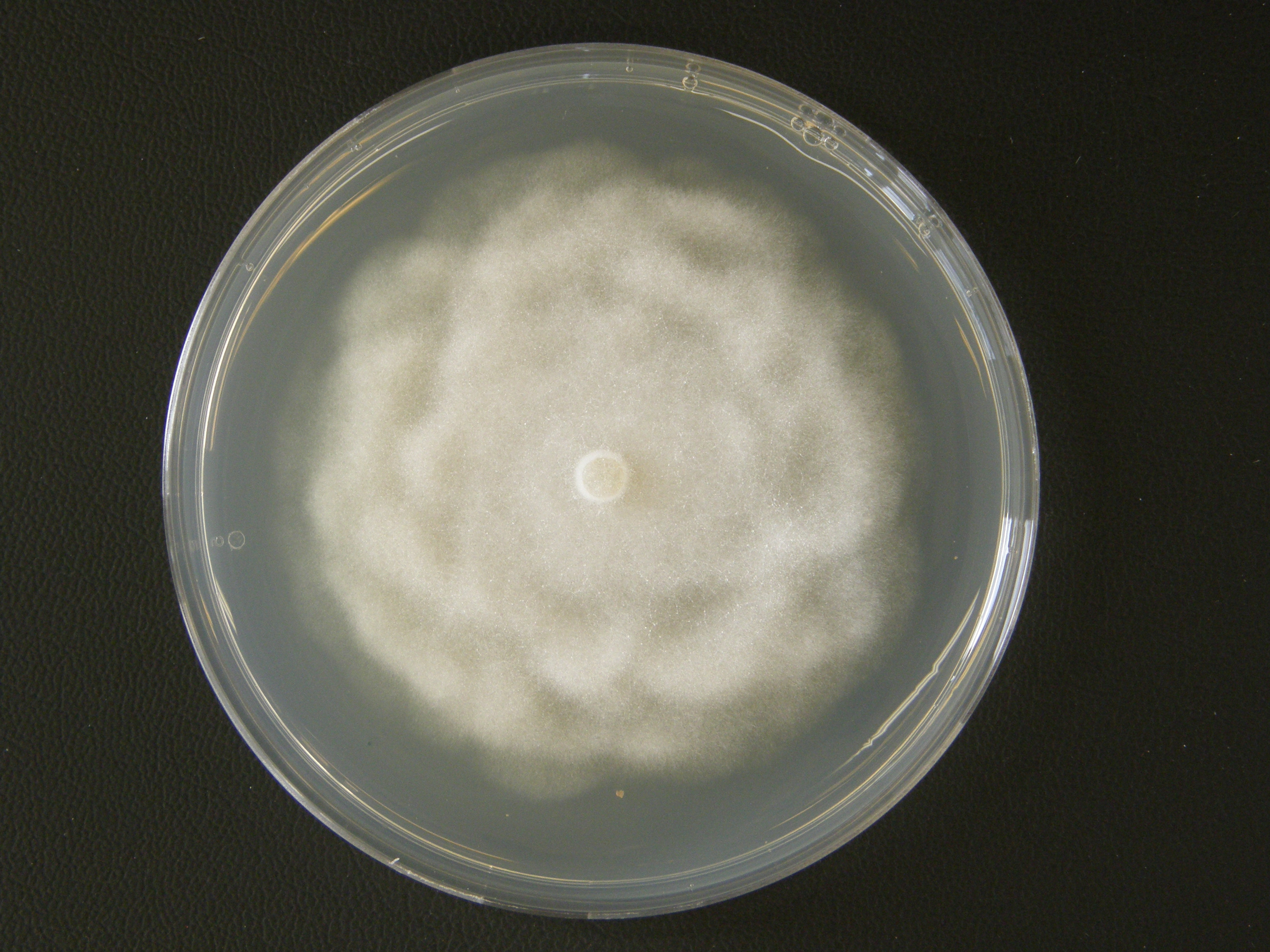
- P. cryptogea colony on potato dextrose agar

Scientific classification
- Domain: Eukaryota
- Clade: Sar
- Clade: Stramenopiles
- Phylum: Oomycota
- Class: Peronosporomycetes
- Order: Peronosporales
- Family: Peronosporaceae
- Genus: Phytophthora
- Species: P. cryptogea

Binomial name
- Phytophthora cryptogea Pethybr. & Laff., (1919)

= Phytophthora cryptogea =

Species of single-celled organism

Phytophthora cryptogea is a species of water mould in the family Pythiaceae. It is a plant pathogen that infects several species of cultivated plants, including over 40 species of cultivated flowers. It was first described as the cause of tomato foot rot in tomatoes

== Host range and symptoms ==
This species is reported to be pathogenic on grandiflora petunia (Petunia × atkinsiana). It causes root rot, shoot rot and shanking in tulips. It also infects blue daze (Evolvulus glomeratus), dusty miller (Jacobaea maritima), Barberton daisy (Gerbera jamesonii), and garden verbena (Verbena × hybrida). Like its relative Phytophtora cambivora, it can cause ink disease of chestnuts (Castanea sativa).

The species is a cause of foot rot in tomatoes, causing discoloration and lesion in the stem. Progression of lesions leads to girdling, root system rot and plant collapse. Foliage will not be affected until plant stem has become girdled.

== Life cycle ==
P. cryptogea are prolific in wet, waterlogged soil and can persist for long periods of time in soil on organic matter. It reproduces asexually through sporangiophores and accompanying non-papillate sporangia in liquid media as well as by uneven, irregular hyphal growth. It does not produce chlamydospores. Sexual reproduction is heterothallic, typically requiring an opposite mating type but sometimes occurring in aged single cultures. Sexual structures produced are antheridia and oogonia that fill with oospores.

== Species differentiation ==
This and Phytophthora drechsleri have been considered the same species, but phylogenetic analysis has revealed that they are two distinct species.
