= Carthamin =

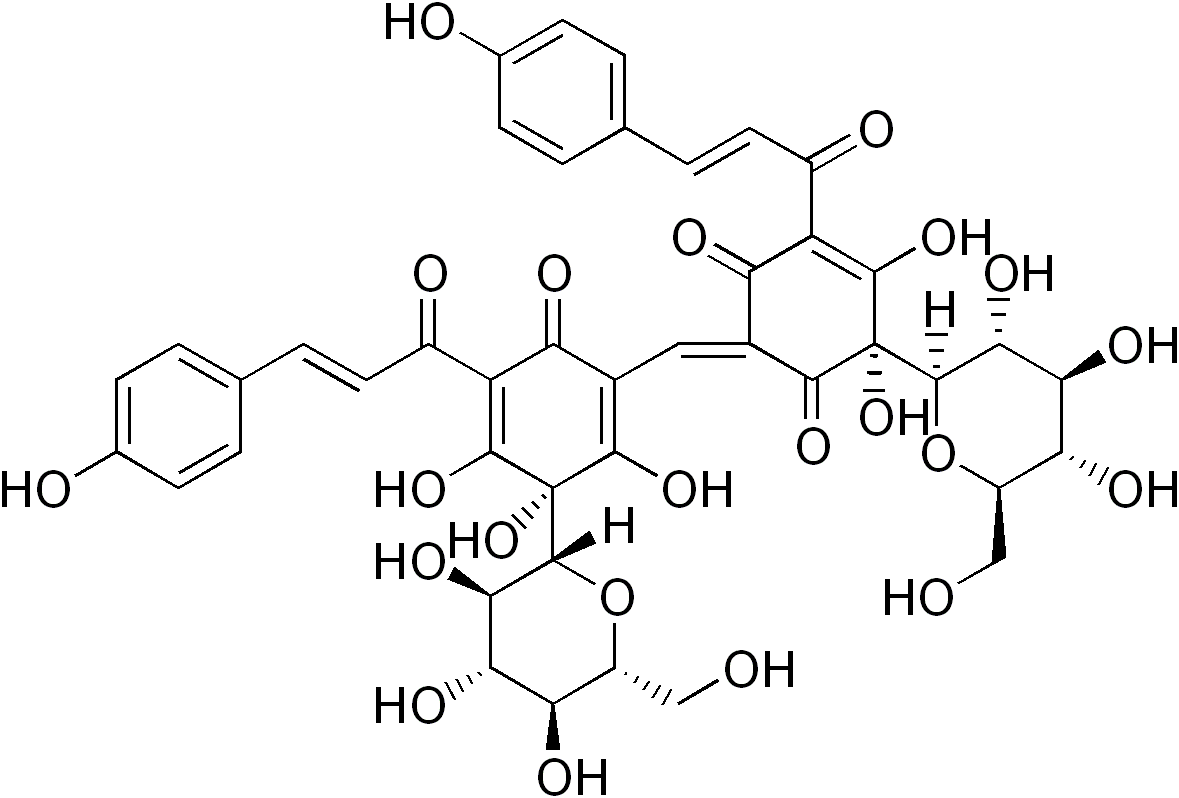

Names
- IUPAC name (2Z,6S)-6-β-D-Glucopyranosyl-2-[ [(3S)-3-β-D-glucopyranosyl-2,3,4-trihydroxy-5-[(2E)-3-(4-hydroxyphenyl)-1-oxo-2-propenyl]-6-oxo-1,4-cyclohexadien-1-yl]methylene]-5,6-dihydroxy-4-[(2E)-3-(4-hydroxyphenyl)-1-oxo-2-propenyl]-4-cyclohexene-1,3-dione
- Other names: Carthamine; Carthamic acid; C.I. Natural Red 26; Safflower red

Identifiers
CAS Number	36338-96-2
3D model (JSmol)	Interactive image; Interactive image
ChemSpider	21106423
ECHA InfoCard	100.048.150
PubChem CID	11968069
UNII	P9ZT730WWS
CompTox Dashboard (EPA)	DTXSID50897503
- InChI: InChI=1S/C43H42O22/c44-14-24-30(52)32(54)34(56)40(64-24)42(62)36(58)20(28(50)26(38(42)60)22(48)11-5-16-1-7-18(46)8-2-16)13-21-29(51)27(23(49)12-6-17-3-9-19(47)10-4-17)39(61)43(63,37(21)59)41-35(57)33(55)31(53)25(15-45)65-41/h1-13,24-25,30-35,40-41,44-48,50-57,62-63H,14-15H2/b11-5+,12-6+,21-13+,26-22+/t24-,25-,30-,31-,32+,33+,34-,35-,40?,41?,42+,43-/m1/s1 Key: UZPQVEVQJJKELH-YOKGVFNOSA-N; InChI=1/C43H42O22/c44-14-24-30(52)32(54)34(56)40(64-24)42(62)36(58)20(28(50)26(38(42)60)22(48)11-5-16-1-7-18(46)8-2-16)13-21-29(51)27(23(49)12-6-17-3-9-19(47)10-4-17)39(61)43(63,37(21)59)41-35(57)33(55)31(53)25(15-45)65-41/h1-13,24-25,30-35,40-41,44-48,50-57,62-63H,14-15H2/b11-5+,12-6+,21-13+,26-22+/t24-,25-,30-,31-,32+,33+,34-,35-,40?,41?,42+,43-/m1/s1 Key: UZPQVEVQJJKELH-YOKGVFNOBD
- SMILES: Oc1ccc(cc1)/C=CC(\O)=C6\C(\O)=C(\C=C/4\C(=O)[C@](O)(C2O[C@H](CO)[C@@H](O)[C@H](O)[C@H]2O)C(=O)C(\C(=O)/C=C/c3ccc(O)cc3)=C\4\O)C(=O)[C@@](O)(C5O[C@H](CO)[C@@H](O)[C@H](O)[C@H]5O)C6=O; O=C(/C=C/C3=CC=C(O)C=C3)C(C(/C1=C/C2=C(O)[C@]([C@@]6([H])[C@H](O)[C@@H](O)[C@H](O)[C@@H](CO)O6)(O)C(O)=C(C(/C=C/C5=CC=C(O)C=C5)=O)C2=O)=O)=C(O)[C@]([C@]4([H])O[C@H](CO)[C@@H](O)[C@H](O)[C@H]4O)(O)C1=O

Properties
Chemical formula	C_{43}H_{42}O_{22}
Molar mass	910.787 g·mol^{−1}
Appearance	Red powder
Solubility in water	Slightly soluble
- Except where otherwise noted, data are given for materials in their standard state (at 25 °C [77 °F], 100 kPa). verify (what is ?) Infobox references

Carthamin is a natural red pigment derived from safflower (Carthamus tinctorius), earlier known as carthamine. It is used as a dye and a food coloring. As a food additive, it is known as Natural Red 26.

Safflower has been cultivated since ancient times, and carthamin was used as a dye in ancient Egypt. It was used extensively in the past for dyeing wool for the carpet industry in European countries, and in the dyeing of silk and the creation of cosmetics in Japan, where the color is called beni (紅); however, due to the expensive nature of the dye, Japanese safflower dyestuffs were sometimes diluted with other dyes, such as turmeric and sappan. It competed with the early synthetic dye fuchsine as a silk dye after fuchsine's 1859 discovery.

Carthamin is composed of two chalconoids; the conjugated bonds being the cause of the red color. It is derived from precarthamin by a decarboxylase. It should not be confused with carthamidin, another flavonoid.

The carthamin is biosynthesized from a chalcone (2,4,6,4'-tetrahydroxychalcone) and two glucose molecules to give safflor yellow A and with other glucose molecule, safflor yellow B. The next step is the formation of precarthamin and finally carthamin.

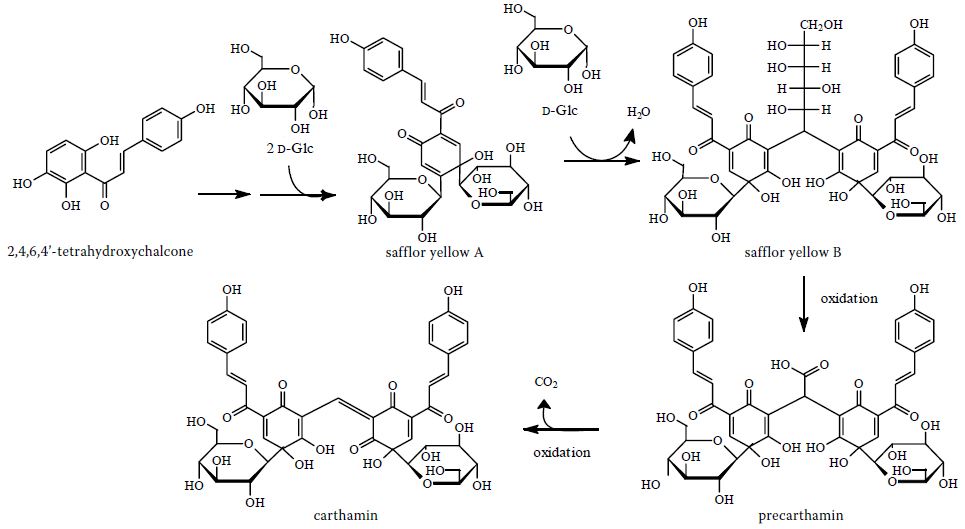
