= Fusarium oxysporum f.sp. carthami =

Scientific classification
- Domain: Eukaryota
- Kingdom: Fungi
- Division: Ascomycota
- Class: Sordariomycetes
- Order: Hypocreales
- Family: Nectriaceae
- Genus: Fusarium
- Species: F. oxysporum
- Forma specialis: F. o. f.sp. carthami

Trionomial name
- Fusarium oxysporum f.sp. carthami Klis. & Houston, (1963)

Synonyms
- Fusarium carthami Klis. & Houston

Subspecies of fungus

Fusarium oxysporum f.sp. carthami is a fungal plant pathogen.
