= Puccinia carthami =

Scientific classification
- Domain: Eukaryota
- Kingdom: Fungi
- Division: Basidiomycota
- Class: Pucciniomycetes
- Order: Pucciniales
- Family: Pucciniaceae
- Genus: Puccinia
- Species: P. carthami

Binomial name
- Puccinia carthami Corda (1840)

Synonyms
- Bullaria carthami (Corda) Arthur & Mains, (1922); Puccinia calcitrapae var. centaureae (DC.) Cummins, (1977); Puccinia centaureae DC., (1815)

Species of fungus

Puccinia carthami is a plant pathogen that causes rust on safflower.

== See also ==
- List of Puccinia species
