= Phytophthora drechsleri =

Scientific classification
- Domain: Eukaryota
- Clade: Sar
- Clade: Stramenopiles
- Clade: Pseudofungi
- Class: Oomycetes
- Order: Peronosporales
- Family: Peronosporaceae
- Genus: Phytophthora
- Species: P. drechsleri

Binomial name
- Phytophthora drechsleri Tucker, (1931)

Varieties
- Phytophthora drechsleri var. cajani

Synonyms
- Phytophthora erythroseptica var. drechsleri (Tucker) Sarej., (1936)

Species of single-celled organism

Phytophthora drechsleri is a plant pathogen with many hosts.

== Affected plants ==
See:

- List of potato diseases
- List of maize diseases
- List of almond diseases
- List of apricot diseases
- List of beet diseases
- List of caneberries diseases
- List of cassava diseases
- List of tomato diseases
- List of sunflower diseases
- List of safflower diseases
- List of poinsettia diseases
- List of pigeonpea diseases
- List of peach and nectarine diseases
- List of Persian walnut diseases
- List of chickpea diseases
