= Sphaceloma poinsettiae =

Scientific classification
- Domain: Eukaryota
- Kingdom: Fungi
- Division: Ascomycota
- Class: Dothideomycetes
- Order: Myriangiales
- Family: Elsinoaceae
- Genus: Sphaceloma
- Species: S. poinsettiae

Binomial name
- Sphaceloma poinsettiae Jenkins & G. D. Ruehle, (1942)

Species of fungus

Sphaceloma poinsettiae is a fungal plant pathogen. It causes poinsettia scab, which is a spot anthracnose disease.
