= Poinsettia mosaic virus =

Virus classification
- (unranked): Virus
- Realm: Riboviria
- Kingdom: Orthornavirae
- Phylum: Kitrinoviricota
- Class: Alsuviricetes
- Order: Tymovirales
- Family: Tymoviridae
- Species: Poinsettia mosaic virus

Species of virus

Poinsettia mosaic virus (PnMV) is a pathogenic plant virus.
