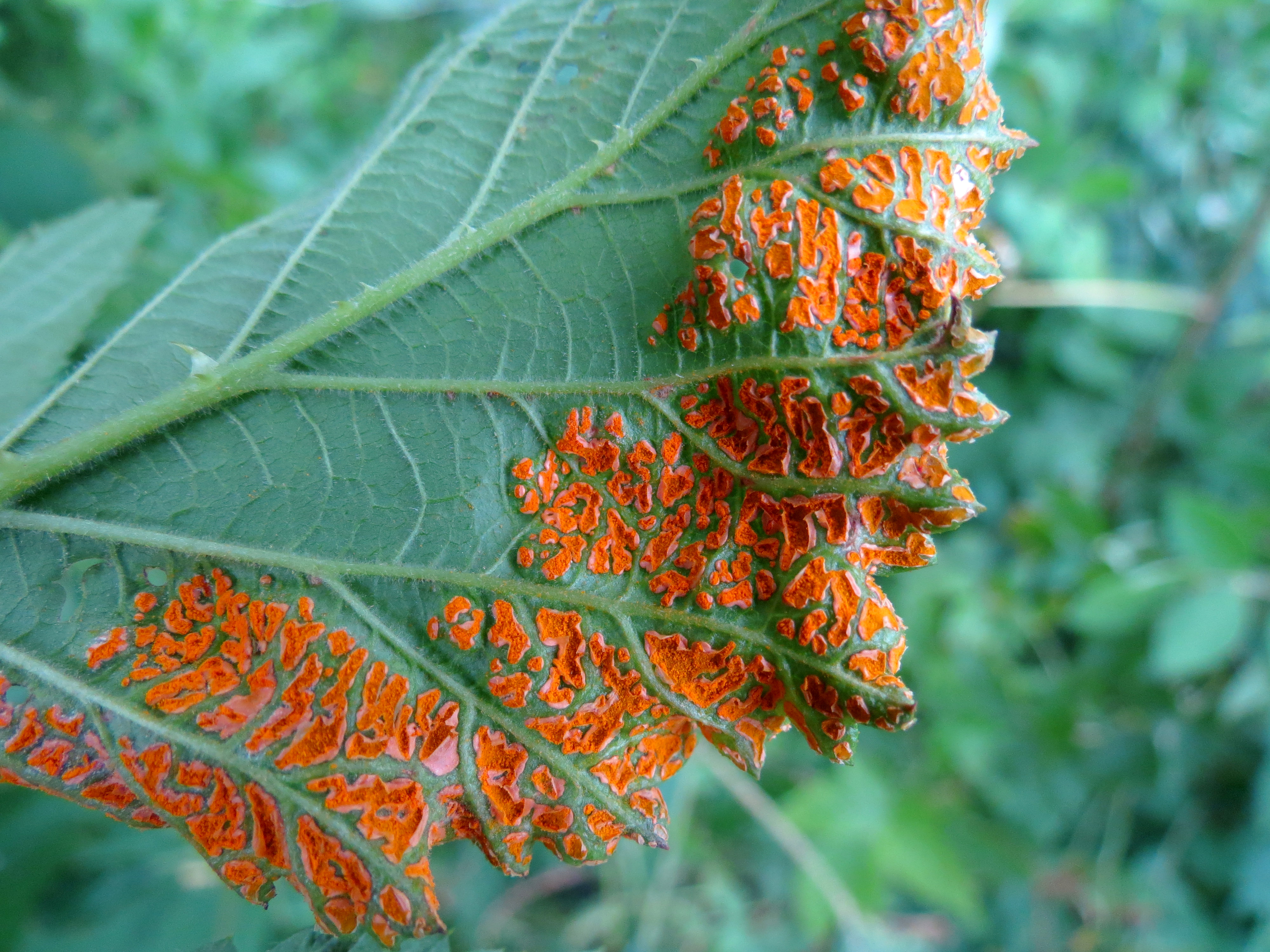
- Arthuriomyces peckianus found at Frostburg State University Arboretum, Frostburg, Maryland

Scientific classification
- Domain: Eukaryota
- Kingdom: Fungi
- Division: Basidiomycota
- Class: Pucciniomycetes
- Order: Pucciniales
- Family: Phragmidiaceae
- Genus: Arthuriomyces
- Species: A. peckianus

Binomial name
- Arthuriomyces peckianus (Howe) Cummins, & Y.Hirats. (1983)

Synonyms
- Puccinia peckiana Howe (1873); Gymnoconia peckiana (Howe) Trotter (1910)

= Arthuriomyces peckianus =

Species of fungus

Arthuriomyces peckianus is a fungal plant pathogen, which causes orange rust on members of the genus Rubus, and various species of berries. It is found in North America and Eurasia.
