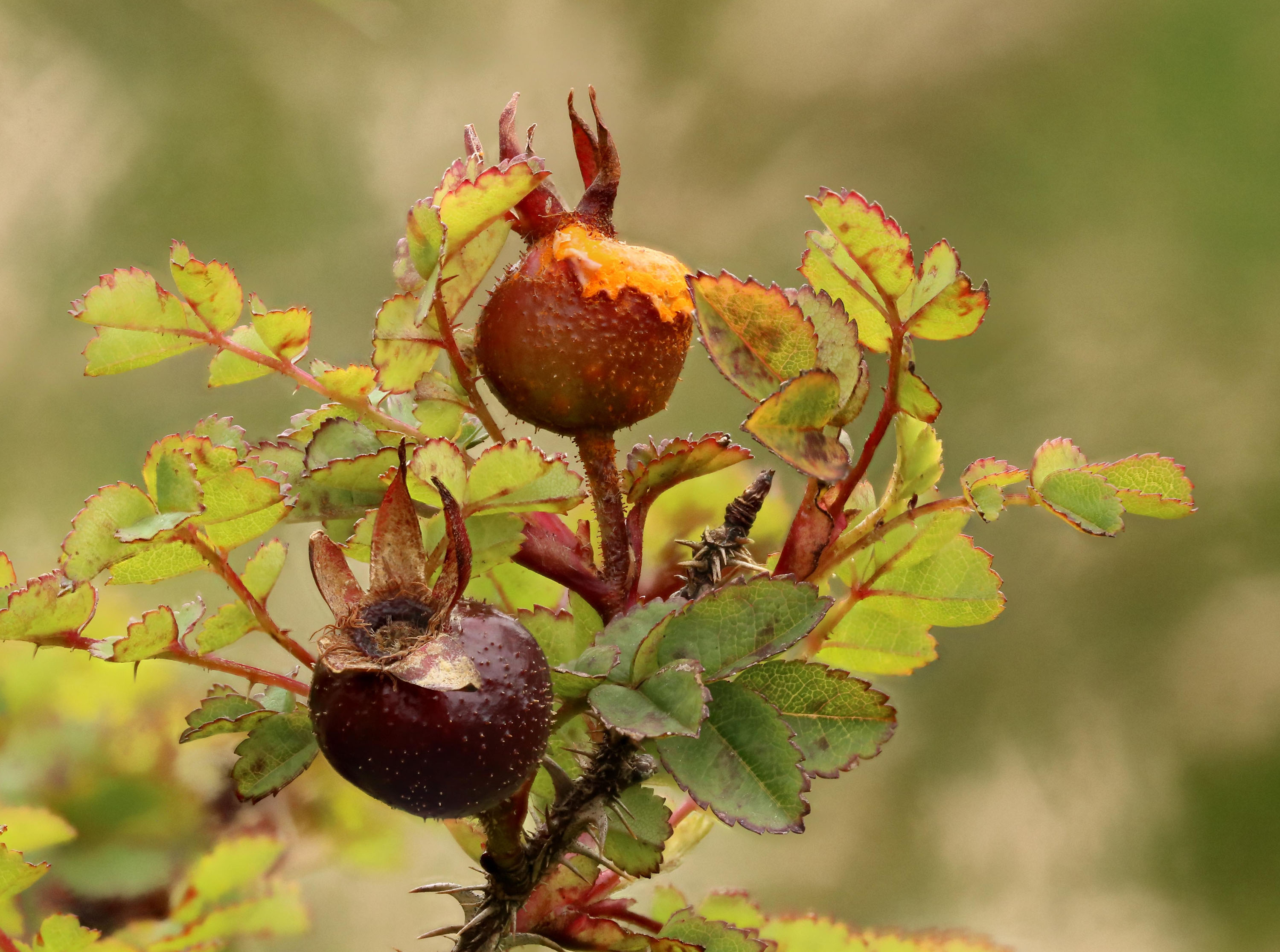
- Phragmidium rosae-pimpinellifoliae at Rosa spinosissima

Scientific classification
- Domain: Eukaryota
- Kingdom: Fungi
- Division: Basidiomycota
- Class: Pucciniomycetes
- Order: Pucciniales
- Family: Phragmidiaceae
- Genus: Phragmidium
- Species: P. rosae-pimpinellifoliae

Binomial name
- Phragmidium rosae-pimpinellifoliae Dietel (1905)

Synonyms
- Phragmidium rosarum f. rosae-pimpinellifoliae Rabenh. (1873); Phragmidium disciflorum sensu Grove (1913)

= Phragmidium rosae-pimpinellifoliae =

Species of fungus

Phragmidium rosae-pimpinellifoliae is a species of fungus in the family Phragmidiaceae. A plant pathogen, it causes a rust on the stem, leaves, petioles and fruits of burnet rose and related hybrids. The fungus is found in Europe and North America.
