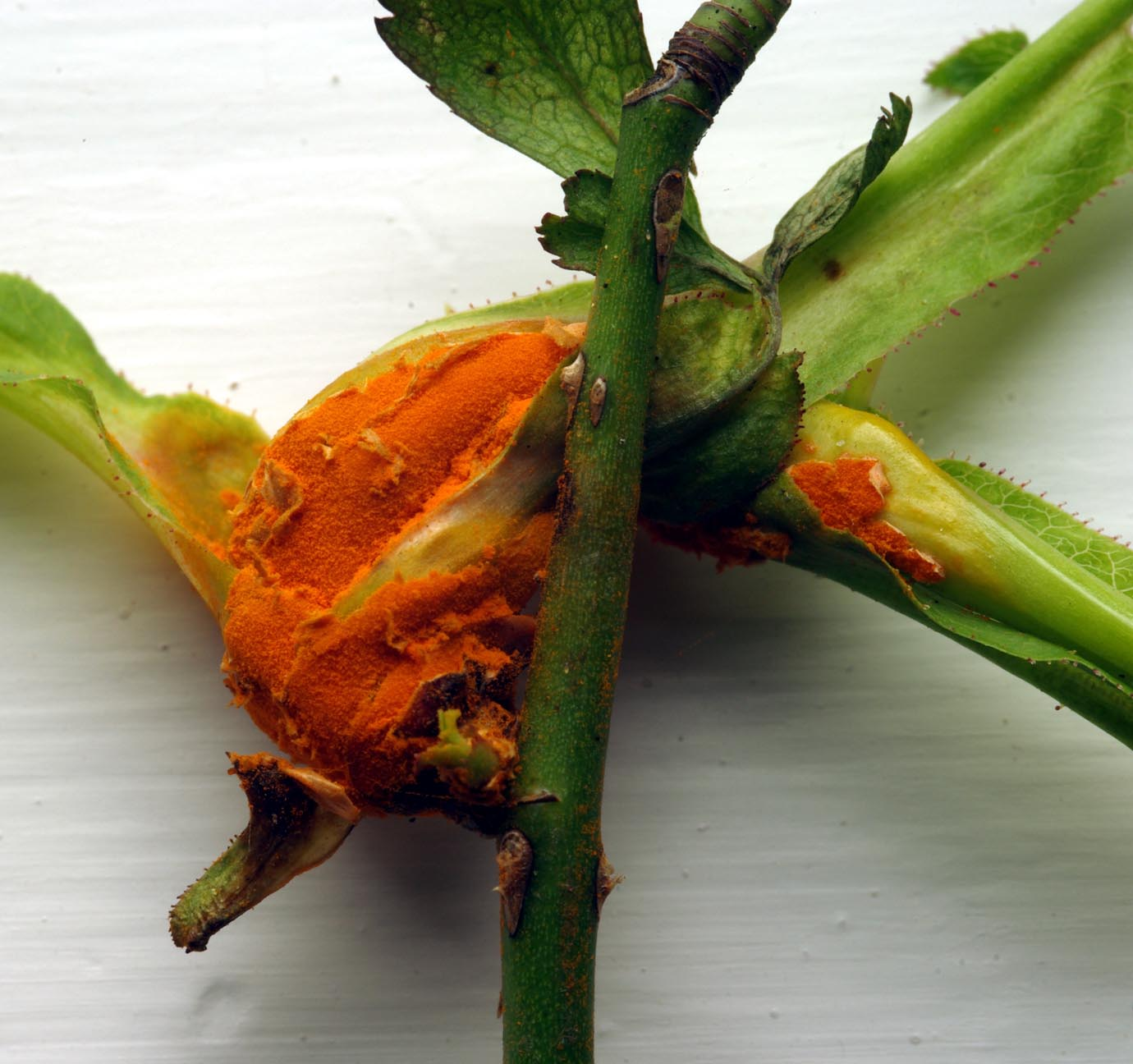

Scientific classification
- Domain: Eukaryota
- Kingdom: Fungi
- Division: Basidiomycota
- Class: Pucciniomycetes
- Order: Pucciniales
- Family: Phragmidiaceae
- Genus: Phragmidium; Link (1815)

Type species
- Phragmidium mucronatum (Pers.) Schltdl. (1824)

Synonyms
- Ameris Arthur (1906); Aregma Fr. (1815); Earlea Arthur (1906); Epitea Fr. (1832); Frommea Arthur (1917); Lecythea Lév. (1847); Phragmidiopsis (G.Winter) Mussat (1901); Phragmotelium Syd. (1921); Physonema Lév. (1847); Teloconia Syd. (1921); Trolliomyces Ulbr. (1938)

= Phragmidium =

Genus of fungi

Phragmidium is a genus of rust fungus that typically infects plant species in the family Rosaceae. It is characterised by having stalked teliospores borne on telia each having a row of four or more cells. All species have a caeoma which is a diffuse aecidium lacking a peridium.

There are a number of species of Phragmidium, most of which are restricted to one or a few host species. Examples include:

- Phragmidium acuminatum on Rubus saxatile
- Phragmidium bulbosum on Rubus fruticosus and Rubeus caesius
- Phragmidium mucronatum
- Phragmidium sterilis on Potentilla sterilis
- Phragmidium potentillae on Potentilla anglica
- Phragmidium rosae-pimpinellifoliae
- Phragmidium rubi-idaei on raspberry
- Phragmidium tuberculatum on some rose cultivars
- Phragmidium violaceum on cultivated blackberry and loganberry

Possibly the most commonly encountered is P. mucronatum, found on most species of wild roses including Rosa canina and Rosa arvensis.

== Hosts and symptoms ==
Phragmidium tuberculatum, also known as rose rust, is a parasitic fungus that feeds on living cells of a host plant. It can affect all species of the family Rosaceae. This includes all species of roses. Rose rust causes distortion and discoloration on stems. Sometimes it will cause galls and lesions. In the spring, there are yellow spots on the upper portion of the leaf and during the Spring and Summer there are orange spores on the abaxial surface of the leaf.

== Environment ==
The climate most favorable to rose rust is mild temperatures with high moisture. Most of this strain of Phragmidium is found in Europe but there have been cases found in Asia and North America. Most of the cases of rose rust in the United States are found on the coasts, mainly the Pacific Coast. The Midwest is poor for this pathogen because of its extreme winter and summer temperatures.

== Disease cycle ==
In the spring, the very first spores, spermatogonia, arise out of the debris on the ground and infects the young stem, distorting them and producing orange pustules. These pustules break open and infect the leaves. In the Summer, these darker orange spores called urediniospores spread through wind. Eventually in late August, the urediniospores and sori become speckled with black fascicles and dark resting spores called teliospores. The teliospores turn into aeciospores which are the spores that adhere to stems and leaves to overwinter.

== Pathology ==
Roses infected with species of Phragmidium will show a characteristic orange mass of spores and distorted growth at specific locations on the bush. The rose may be substantially weakened and lack vigour and may die. Later in the year, small black spots or raised areas will be visible. These are telia containing overwintering teliospores.

== Prevention ==
Rose growers recommend the use of fungicides some of which may have health implications for the gardener. Many cultivated roses are now bred to have resistance to rust diseases. In wild roses, Phragmidium infections are one of a normal range of pests and diseases which are part of the normal ecological pressures affecting all species. Non-chemical controls include pruning out the spring infections as soon as possible along with collecting and destroying fallen leaves to prevent overwintering.
