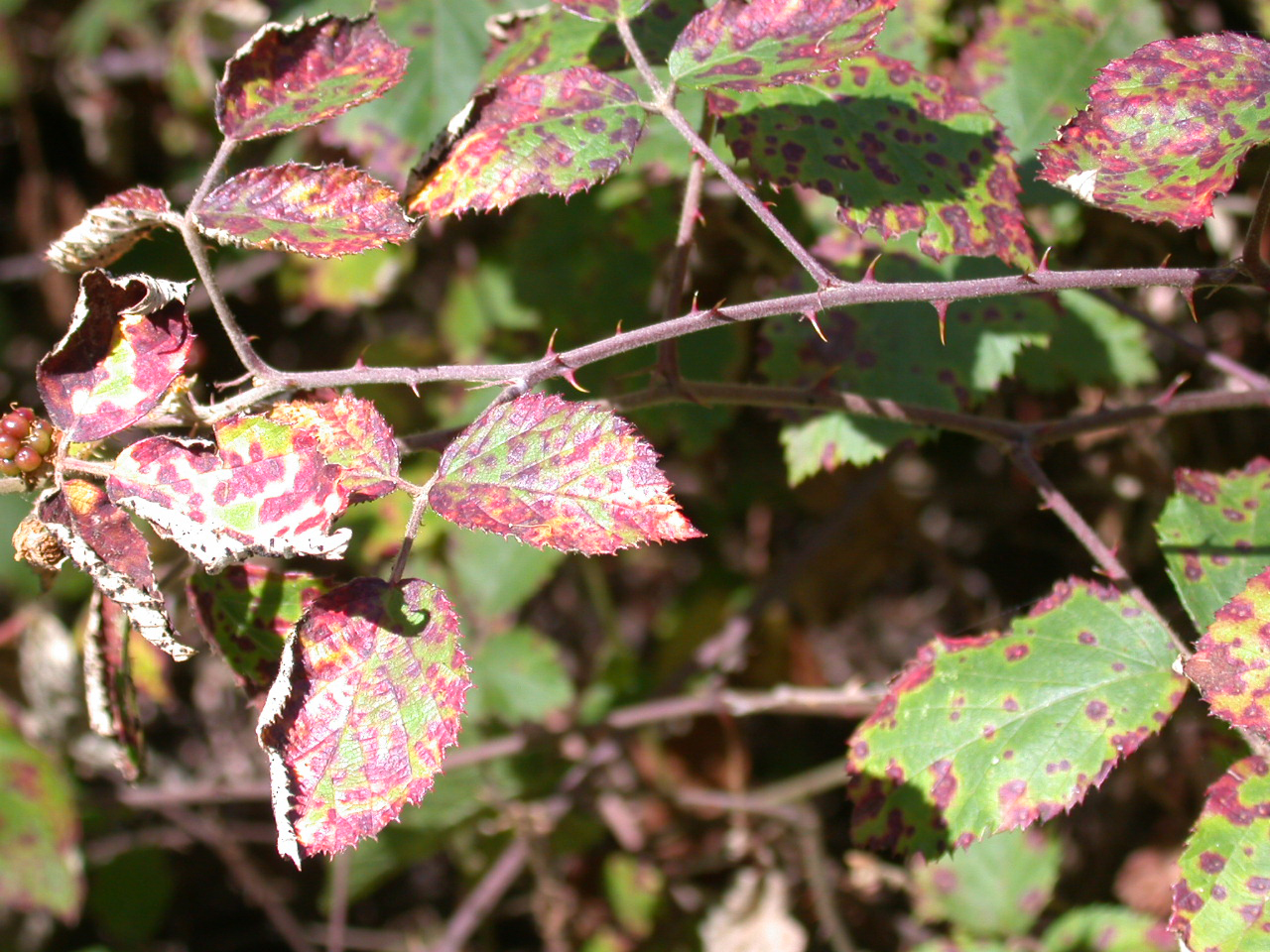
- Blackberry plants infected with rust fungus, a biological control agent for blackberry. The newly released strains of the European blackberry rust fungus (Phragmidium violaceum) are highly host-specific for weedy blackberries.

Scientific classification
- Kingdom: Fungi
- Division: Basidiomycota
- Class: Pucciniomycetes
- Order: Pucciniales
- Family: Phragmidiaceae
- Genus: Phragmidium
- Species: P. violaceum

Binomial name
- Phragmidium violaceum (Schultz) G. Winter, (1880)

Synonyms
- Lecythea ruborum Lév., (1847); Puccinia violacea Schultz, (1806); Uredo ruborum

= Phragmidium violaceum =

Species of fungus

Phragmidium violaceum is a plant pathogen native to Europe, Africa, and the Middle East. It primarily infects Rubus species.

It has been used in the biological control of invasive blackberry species in Chile, Australia, and New Zealand. In 2005, it was discovered growing on Himalayan blackberry plants in Oregon, USA. This accidental introduction does not appear to be infecting native vegetation, so it offers hope for reducing the impact of invasive blackberries in the Pacific Northwest.

== Symptoms ==
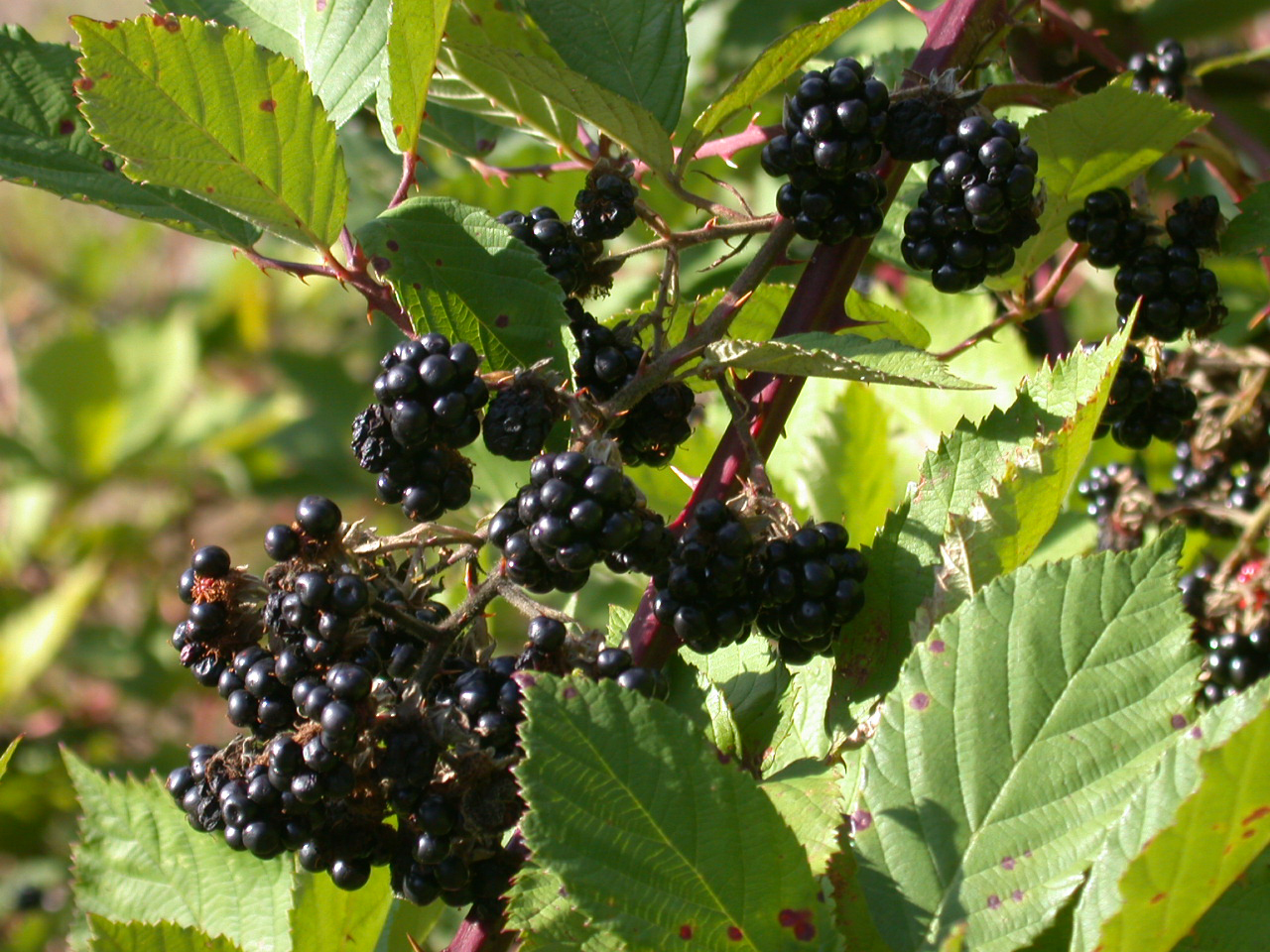
Blackberry plants that are infected with rust fungus showing foliar symptoms.

The foliar symptoms that can be found include purple leaf spots along with yellow and tan centers. These can be found on the upper surface of the leaf and can resemble Septoria leaf spot. On the lower surface of the leaf yellow to orange pustules will be surrounded by a purple tinge. These can resemble cane and leaf rust. The leaves that are severely infected can start to dehydrate as well as start to curl. The leaves that are older and closer to the cane will get infected first and can die as well. The flowers and the fruits that are infected may fail to ripen. Stem infections as well as the continuous defoliation may cause the dieback of the canes. During the summer and fall the infected leaves can start to develop black pustules otherwise known as telia among the uredinia.

== Disease cycle ==
The pathogen is a macrocyclic, autoecious rust fungus, and produces five different spore states that represent the asexual and sexual components of the life cycle. Dikaryotic urediniospores are released during the summer as well as the spring while teliospores represent the overwintering stage. When the sexual outcrossing occurs the dikaryotic aeciospores and urediniospores are initiated. The teliospores in the spring will then undergo meiosis in order to produce haploid basidiospores. This follows the insect-mediated transfer of spermatia from the spermogonia of the different types of mating to the receptive hyphae. The spores are spread very easily and can be spread by wind.

== Management ==
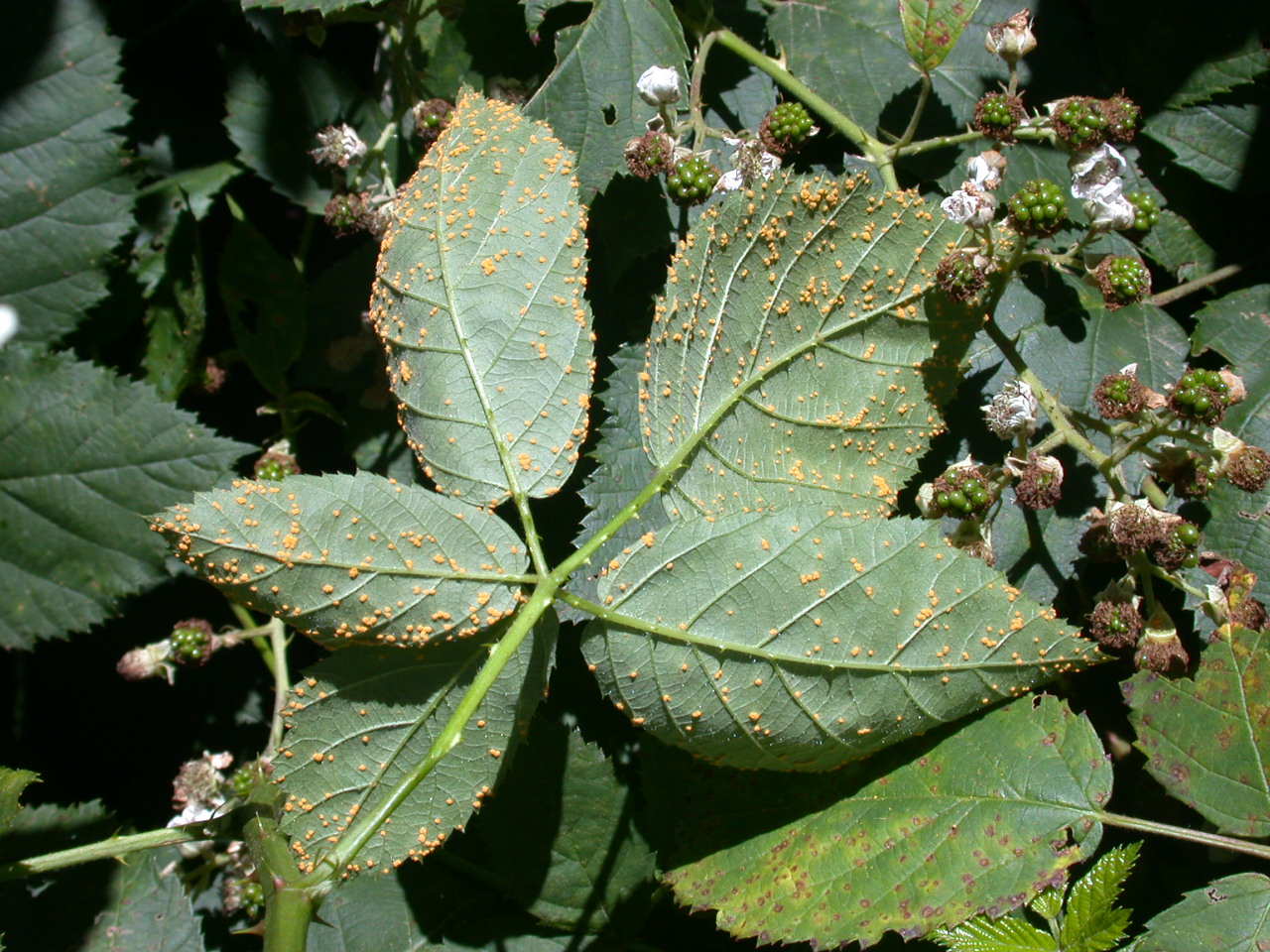
Symptoms of the lower surface of the infected plant showing yellow pustules.

Cultural tactics along with dormant season lime sulfur can help to reduce the initial inoculums source. The chemical tactics function to protect the healthy younger plant tissues. By removing the old fruiting canes early, after the harvest it will prevent the spreading of the infection. Chemical controls can be effective as well. Chemical protection will need to start by applying lime sulfur to the leaves that are infected. Fungicide application during fall, in the month of September, is the most beneficial for the health of the plant. There may be development of fungal resistance if there is overuse of any single product. The fungicides are primarily protectants therefore, cannot eradicate the disease after it becomes established. The biological control works when an uncharacterized population and or a mixture of strains of a pathogen from the native range of the target weed is released in the area into which the weed is introduced. The strain F15 was released as a biological control agent in 1991 and 1992. The release of the additional strains can originate the potential to increase the genetic diversity of the population of P. violaceum. The occurrence through recombination or the increase in the effective population size can in turn improve the impact of the biological control agent. Biological control agent is likely to be successful, however there is a high potential for the failure of additional strains due to the amount of inoculums involved in the pathogen strain recruitment. The amount of inoculums released is small when compared with the well-adapted pathogen that exists in the population
