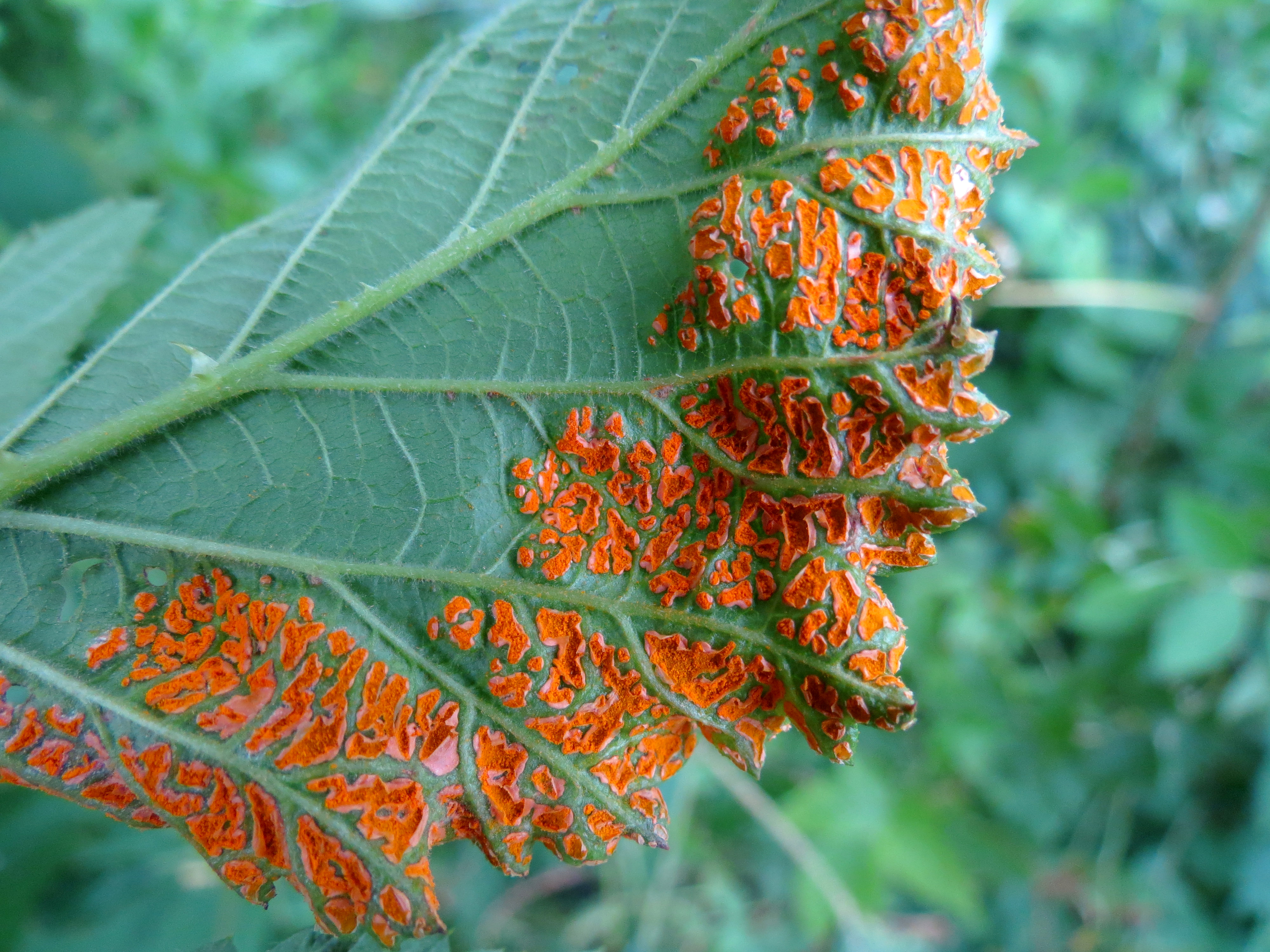
- Arthuriomyces peckianus found at Frostburg State University Arboretum, Frostburg, Maryland

Scientific classification
- Domain: Eukaryota
- Kingdom: Fungi
- Division: Basidiomycota
- Class: Pucciniomycetes
- Order: Pucciniales
- Family: Phragmidiaceae
- Genus: Arthuriomyces; Cummins & Y.Hirats. (1983)

Type species
- Arthuriomyces peckianus (Howe) Cummins & Y.Hirats. (1983)

Species
- A. peckianus; A. potentillae; A. rubicola

= Arthuriomyces =

Genus of fungi

Arthuriomyces is a genus of rust fungi in the family Phragmidiaceae. The genus contains three species that are found in North America, Russia, China, and Japan. The genus is named in honor of American botanist Joseph Charles Arthur, noted for his research on rust fungi.
