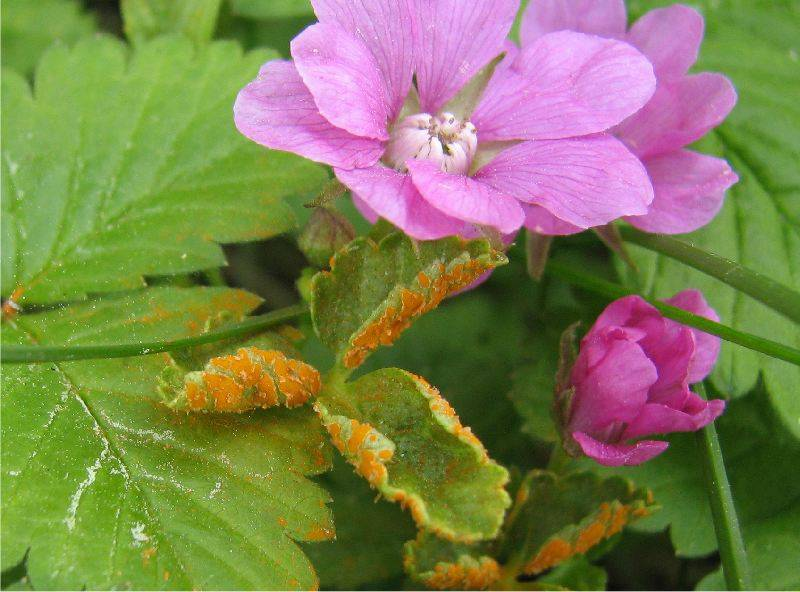
- Gymnoconia nitens

Scientific classification
- Domain: Eukaryota
- Kingdom: Fungi
- Division: Basidiomycota
- Class: Pucciniomycetes
- Order: Pucciniales
- Family: Phragmidiaceae
- Genus: Gymnoconia
- Species: G. nitens

Binomial name
- Gymnoconia nitens (Schwein.) F.Kern & Thurst. (1929)

Synonyms
- Aecidium nitens Schwein. (1822); Caeoma nitens (Schwein.) (1890); Kunkelia nitens (Schwein.) Arthur (1917)

= Gymnoconia nitens =

Species of fungus

Gymnoconia nitens is a species of rust fungus in the Phragmidiaceae family. It is a plant pathogen, and causes orange rust on various berries. The species was originally described in 1822 by mycologist Lewis David de Schweinitz as Aecidium luminatum.
