= Xenodochus =

Xenodochus may refer to:

- xenodochus, title for the director of a xenodochium
- Xenodochus (fungus), genus
- Meroctenus, a genus of beetles formerly called Xenodochus.
