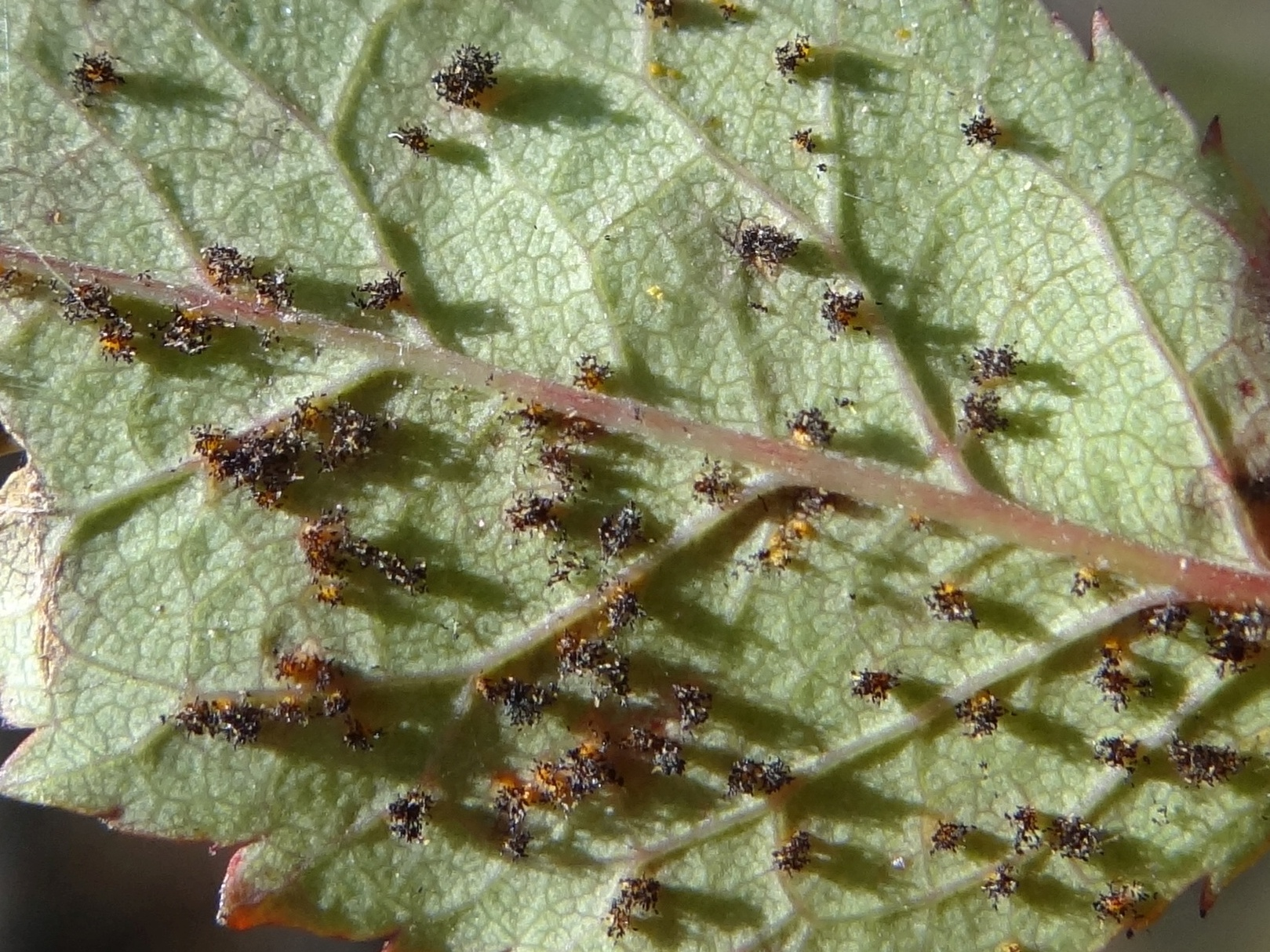
- Phragmidium mucronatum found on Rosa canina in Island Beskids, Poland

Scientific classification
- Kingdom: Fungi
- Division: Basidiomycota
- Class: Pucciniomycetes
- Order: Pucciniales
- Family: Phragmidiaceae
- Genus: Phragmidium
- Species: P. mucronatum

Binomial name
- Phragmidium mucronatum (Pers.) Schltdl., (1824)

Synonyms
- Aregma disciflora Arthur, (1899); Aregma mucronatum (Pers.) Fr., (1832); Ascophora disciflora Tode, (1790); Coleosporium miniatum Bonord., (1860); Coleosporium pingue Lév., (1847); Lecythea rosae Lév., (1847); Lycoperdon subcorticium Schrank, (1793); Phragmidium bullatum Westend., (1863); Phragmidium disciflorum (Tode) J. James, (1895); Phragmidium rosae (Barclay) Tranzschel, (1914); Phragmidium rosae (Pers.) Rostr., (1902); Phragmidium rosarum Fuckel, (1870); Phragmidium subcorticium (Schrank) G. Winter, (1882); Puccinia mucronata Pers., (1794); Puccinia mucronata a rosae Pers., (1794); Puccinia rosae Barclay, (1889); Teloconia rosae (Barclay) Syd., (1921); Trolliomyces rosae (Barclay) Ulbr., (1938); Uredo aurea Purton, (1821); Uredo effusa sensu auct.; (2005); Uromyces ulmariae sensu auct. p.p.; (2005)

= Phragmidium mucronatum =

Species of fungus

Phragmidium mucronatum is a plant pathogen that causes rose rust.
