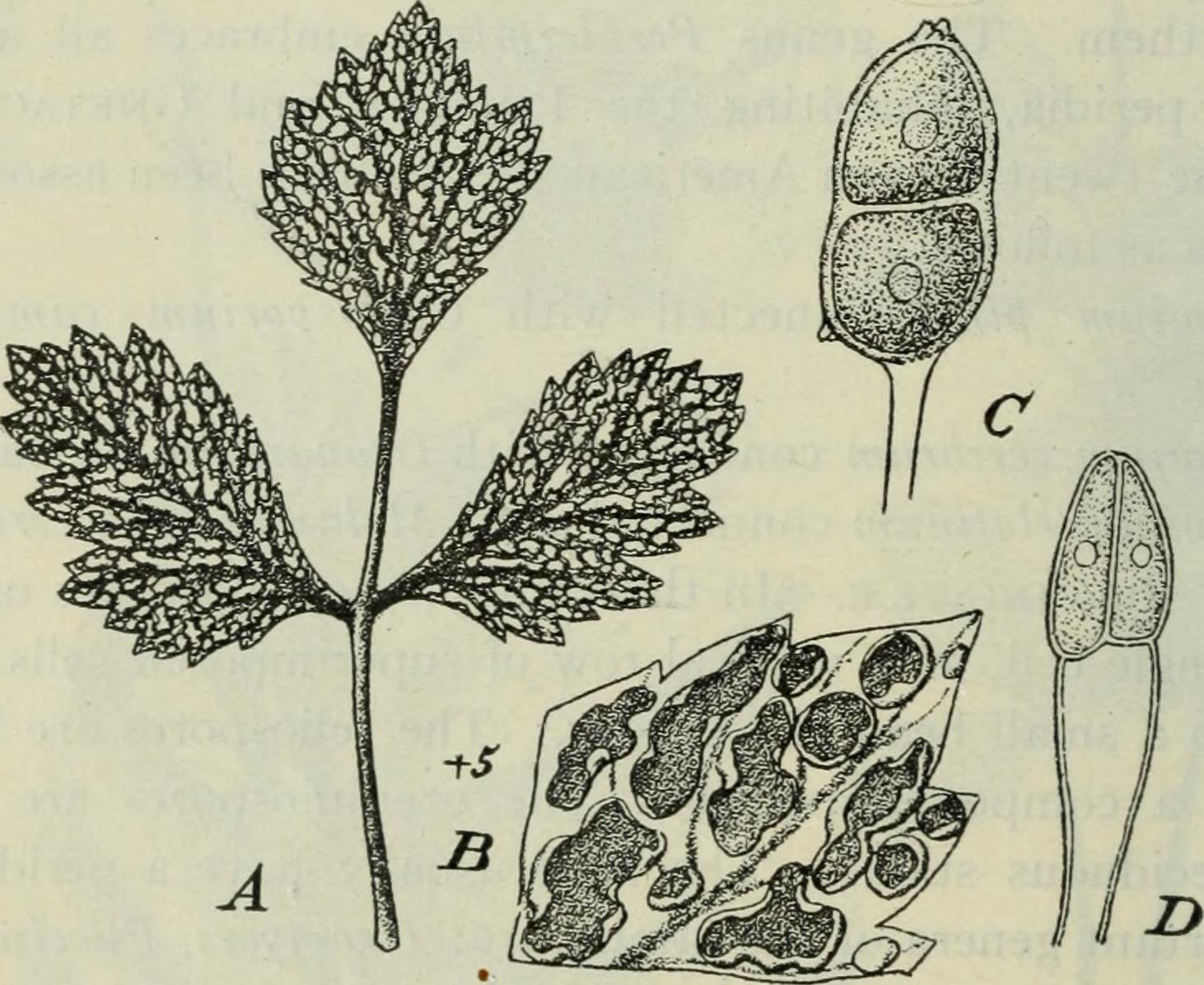
- A-C, G. interstitialis. A, Æcidia on leaf of Rubus canadensis; B, piece of leaf enlarged; C, teliospore

Scientific classification
- Kingdom: Fungi
- Division: Basidiomycota
- Class: Pucciniomycetes
- Order: Pucciniales
- Family: Phragmidiaceae
- Genus: Gymnoconia
- Species: G. interstitialis

Binomial name
- Gymnoconia interstitialis (Schltdl.) Lagerh., 1894

= Gymnoconia interstitialis =

Species of fungus

Gymnoconia interstitialis, otherwise known as orange rust of raspberries, is a well-known disease of raspberries and blackberries throughout the eastern United States and southern Canada. The disease targets the usefulness of the leaves, attacking them until they die and fall off of the plant. The disease returns annually, and this recurrence essentially makes the plants worthless—rarely do affected plants recover. Some strains have such a strong impact on the plants that the cultivation becomes unprofitable. Hesler & Whetzel (1917) claim, "Ten per cent rusty plants are frequently reported. Twenty-five per cent or more are recorded."

== Range ==
It can stretch as far south as Florida, or as far west as California, and is also quite common in Europe and Asia (the disease cycles of this rust that are found in Europe are considered "long", as opposed to some of the "short" cycles found in the United States.) Black raspberries of New York commonly are affected by this disease, but the region north of Connecticut has been successful in containing the disease to a certain area.

== Hosts and symptoms ==
Wild and cultivated raspberries and blackberries are the most common host for Gymnoconia interstitialis. A resistant host has been discovered in Illinois – the Snyder. Signs of the disease begin to appear in the spring. In the spring infected plants' newly formed shoot can be weak and spindly with stunted canes. Glandular bodies form on the top side of the leaves, even before they are entirely unfolded. Once fully mature, these bodies appear as black specks with chlorosis (yellowing) around them. Not all leaves or leaflets of the plant will have the specks. Several weeks after the initial appearance of the bodies, a rust will begin to form on the underside of the leaf. The rust is composed of sori, who will eventually break open and release an orange-colored mass of spores—this is where the disease gets the name "orange rust". Typically, this release of spores is quite intense and ends up filling the whole underside of the leaf with the orange spores. The affected leaves dwarf and roll into themselves, rendering them useless.

== Disease cycle ==
Gymnoconia interstitialis is a fungus – specifically a basidiomycete. The mycelium lives from year to year in the affected plant. 7 cortex (near the cambium). The parenchyma inside of the leaves becomes infected. When in a young plant, hyphae may be found in any of the tissues. In the affected organs of the plant, the mycelium develops haustoria, which appear as side branching from the mycelium. The haustoria penetrate through cell walls to extract nutrients, while the fungus follows the growing-tip of the plant. The mycelium also grow downward to the root crown and new shoots growing from the crown will be rusted the following year. As discussed in the "Hosts and Symptoms" section, black bodies appear on the upper surface of the leaves during the spring. These black bodies are sterile and are referred to as spermagonia, or pycnia. The orange "cushions" that develop later on the under-side of the leaf are forming spores, which have the capability to germinate all at once. From each spore a short promycelium (the germ tube of the spore) bearing four sporidia is protruded. During the growing season, these sporidia cause infections on other plants in the raspberry and blackberry families. The sporidia give rise to mycelium, and once winter comes, the fungus is dormant. The disease overwinters as mycelium in the canes, crown and roots of the plants.

== Management ==
To control Gymnoconia interstitialis ensure that you are using disease free stock. Cultural practices will be very helpful in control, pruning and burning infected canes, roots, berries and leaves before pustules break open.

== Bibliography ==
- Arthur, J. C. (1917). "Orange rusts of Rubus". Botanical Gazette. 63 (6): 501–515. doi:10.1086/332074. S2CID 84784685.
- Clinton, G. P. (1920). New or unusual plant injuries and diseases found in Connecticut, 1916-1919 (No. 222). Connecticut Agricultural Experiment Station.
- Hesler, L. R.; Whetzel, H. H. (1917). Manual of fruit diseases. Macmillan.
- "Gymnoconia interstitialis". Mycobank. International Mycological Association.
- Kunkel, L. O. (1916). "Further studies of the orange rusts of Rubus in the United States". Bulletin of the Torrey Botanical Club. 43 (11): 559–569. doi:10.2307/2479608. JSTOR 2479608.
- Pady, S. M. (1935). "The role of intracellular mycelium in systemic infections of Rubus with the orange-rust". Mycologia. 27 (6): 618–637. doi:10.2307/3754176. JSTOR 3754176.
