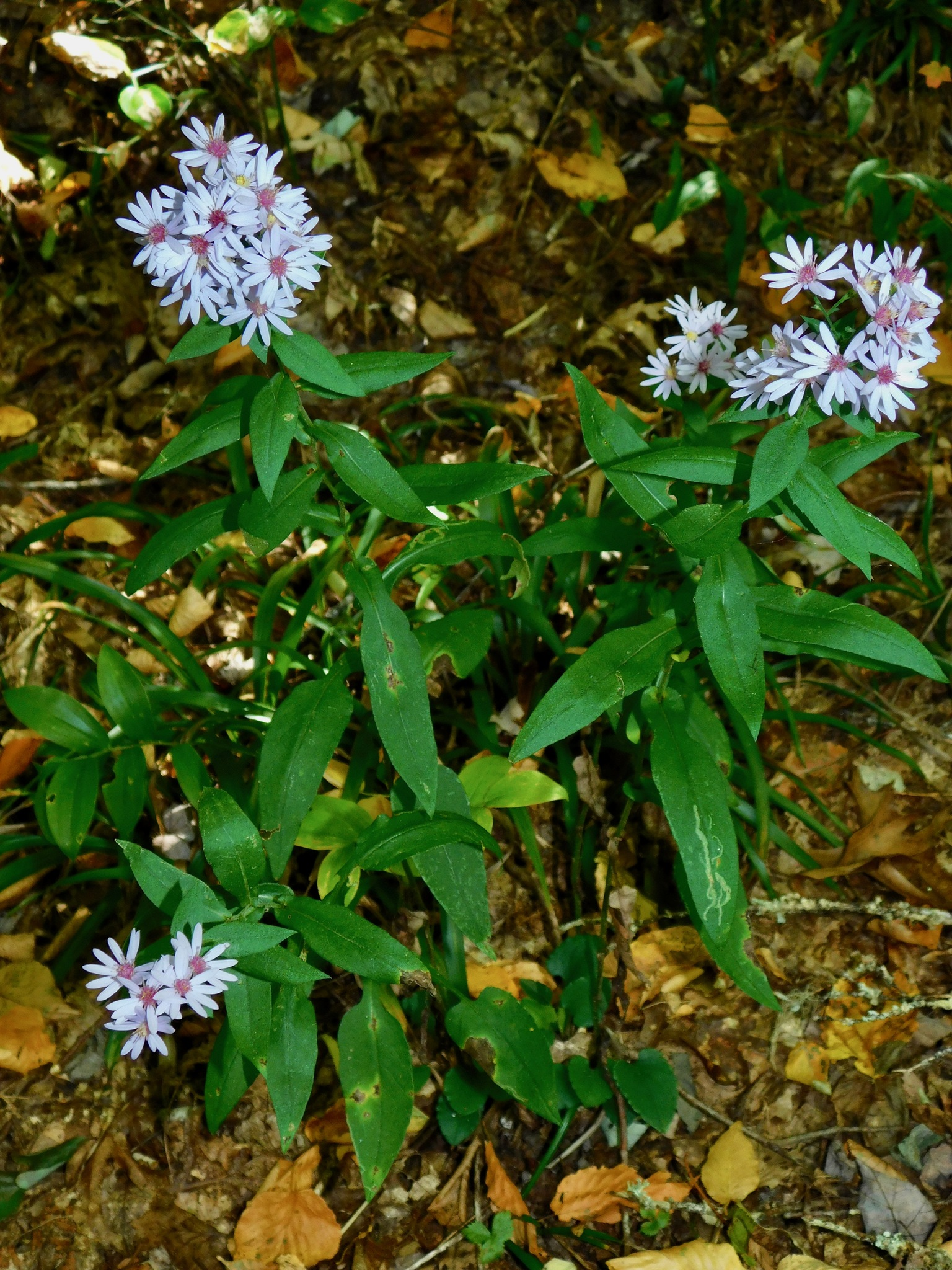

Conservation status
- Secure (NatureServe)

Scientific classification
- Kingdom: Plantae
- Clade: Tracheophytes
- Clade: Angiosperms
- Clade: Eudicots
- Clade: Asterids
- Order: Asterales
- Family: Asteraceae
- Subtribe: Symphyotrichinae
- Genus: Symphyotrichum
- Subgenus: Symphyotrichum subg. Symphyotrichum
- Section: Symphyotrichum sect. Symphyotrichum
- Species: S. undulatum

Binomial name
- Symphyotrichum undulatum (L.) G.L.Nesom
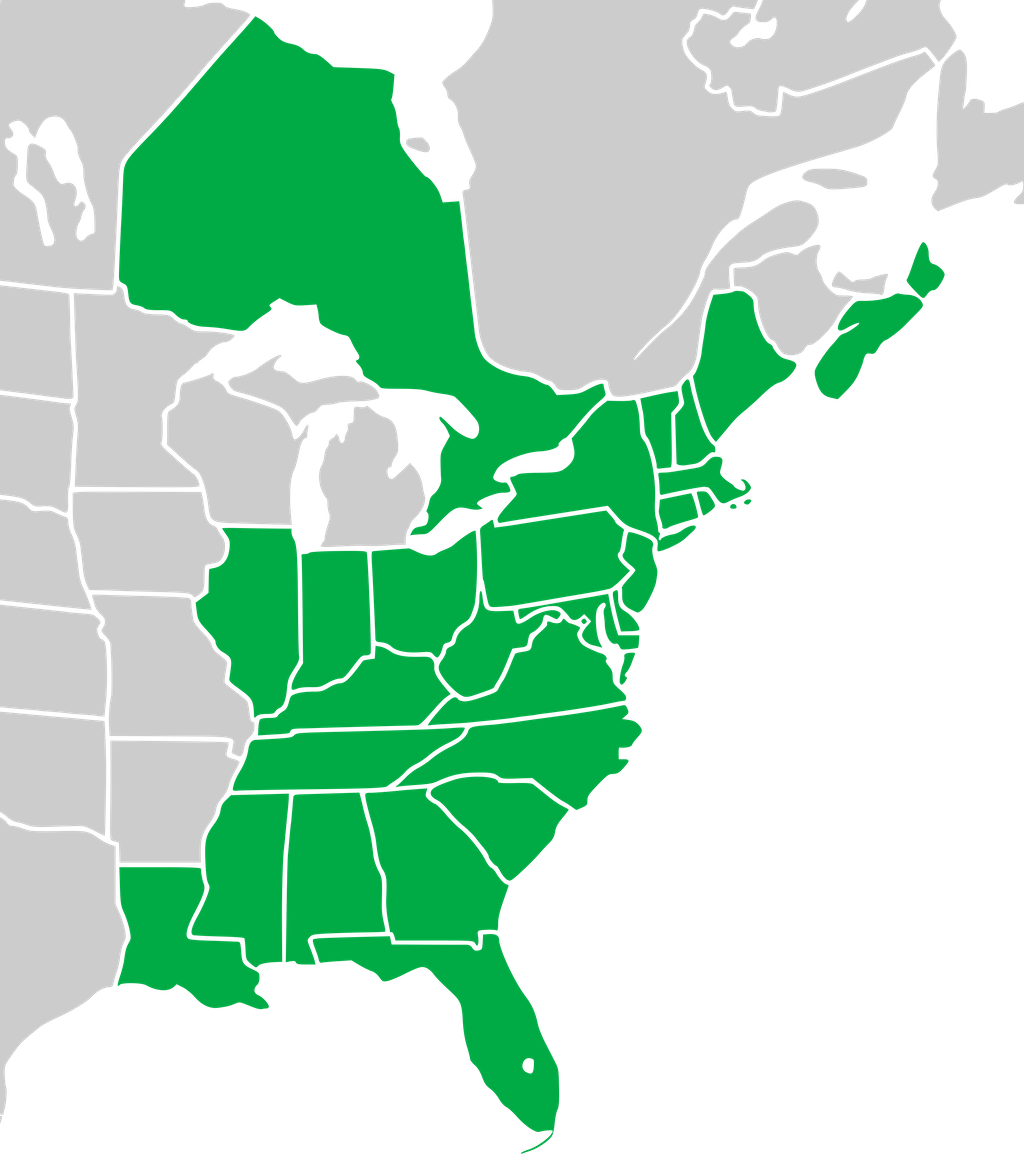
- Native distribution

Synonyms
- Basionym: Aster undulatus L.; Alphabetical list: Aster asperifolius E.S.Burgess; Aster asperulus Torr. & A.Gray; Aster autumnalis Wender. ex Nees; Aster baldwinii Torr. & A.Gray; Aster claviger E.S.Burgess; Aster corrigiatus E.S.Burgess; Aster diversifolius Michx.; Aster gracilescens E.S.Burgess; Aster heteromallus Wender.; Aster linguiformis E.S.Burgess; Aster loriformis (E.S.Burgess) E.S.Burgess; Aster mohrii E.S.Burgess; Aster paniculatus Nutt.; Aster proteus E.S.Burgess; Aster sagittifolius Elliott; Aster scaber Elliott; Aster sylvestris E.S.Burgess; Aster triangularis E.S.Burgess; Aster truellius E.S.Burgess; Aster undulatus var. abruptifolius E.S.Burgess; Aster undulatus var. asperulus Alph.Wood; Aster undulatus var. diversifolius (Michx.) A.Gray; Aster undulatus var. loriformis E.S.Burgess; Aster undulatus var. sylvestris Howe; Aster undulatus var. torquatus E.S.Burgess; Aster undulatus var. triangularis E.S.Burgess

= Symphyotrichum undulatum =

Species of plant in the aster family

Symphyotrichum undulatum (formerly Aster undulatus) is a species of flowering plant in the family Asteraceae native to eastern North America. Its common name is wavyleaf aster, and it is a perennial, herbaceous plant that flowers August through October and may reach heights between 30 and 160 centimeters (1 and 5 feet).

== Description ==
Symphyotrichum undulatum is a perennial, herbaceous plant that flowers from August through October, growing to heights between 30 and 160 centimeters (1 and 5 feet) from a cespitose rootstock. The roots can have short rhizomes or branched and woody caudices.

=== Flowers ===
There are 12–16, sometimes up to 25, blue to purple or sometimes lilac ray florets of lengths 6–12 millimeters (Note: To convert millimeters to inches, divide the number of millimeters by exactly 25.4.) and widths of 1.4–2.5 mm. These surround 15–22, sometimes up to 25, cream or light yellow disk florets of depths 4–5.8 mm with lanceolate lobes of lengths 0.5–0.9 mm. As the disk florets age, they become purple.

=== Fruit ===
The fruits (seeds) of Symphyotrichum undulatum are not true achenes but are cypselae, resembling an achene but surrounded by a calyx sheath. This is true for all members of the Asteraceae family. After pollination, the seeds of S. undulatum become dull purple to light brown or tan with an oblong-obovoid compressed shape, 1.7–2.2 mm in length with 3–4 nerves, and with a few stiff, slender bristles on the surface (strigillose). They also have tufts of hairs (pappi) which are cream or rose-tinged and 3.5–5 mm in length.

=== Chromosomes ===
The species has a monoploid number (also called base number) of eight chromosomes (x = 8). Individual plants with 16 and 32 sets of its chromosomes have been found, meaning the species is diploid and tetraploid.

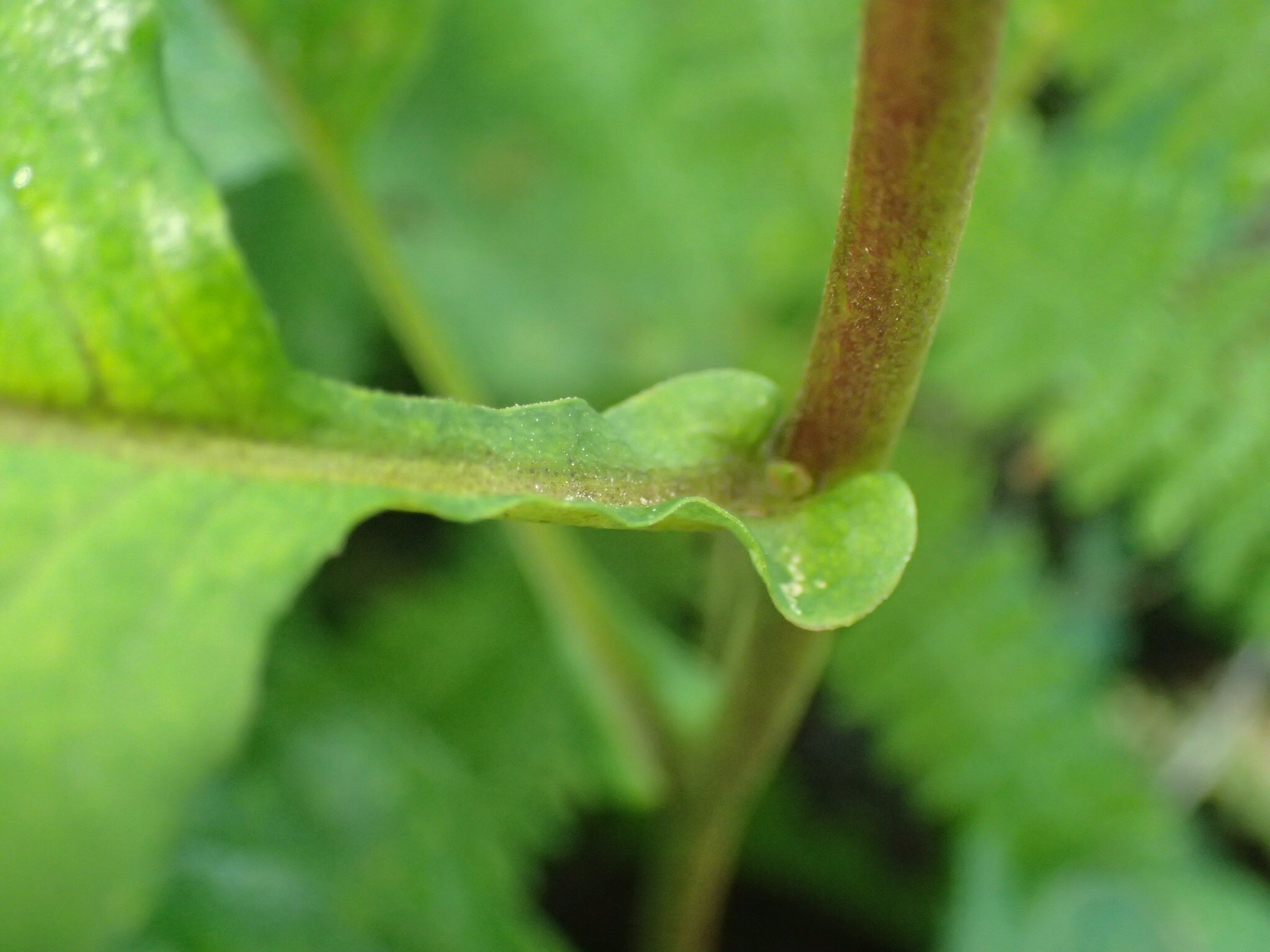

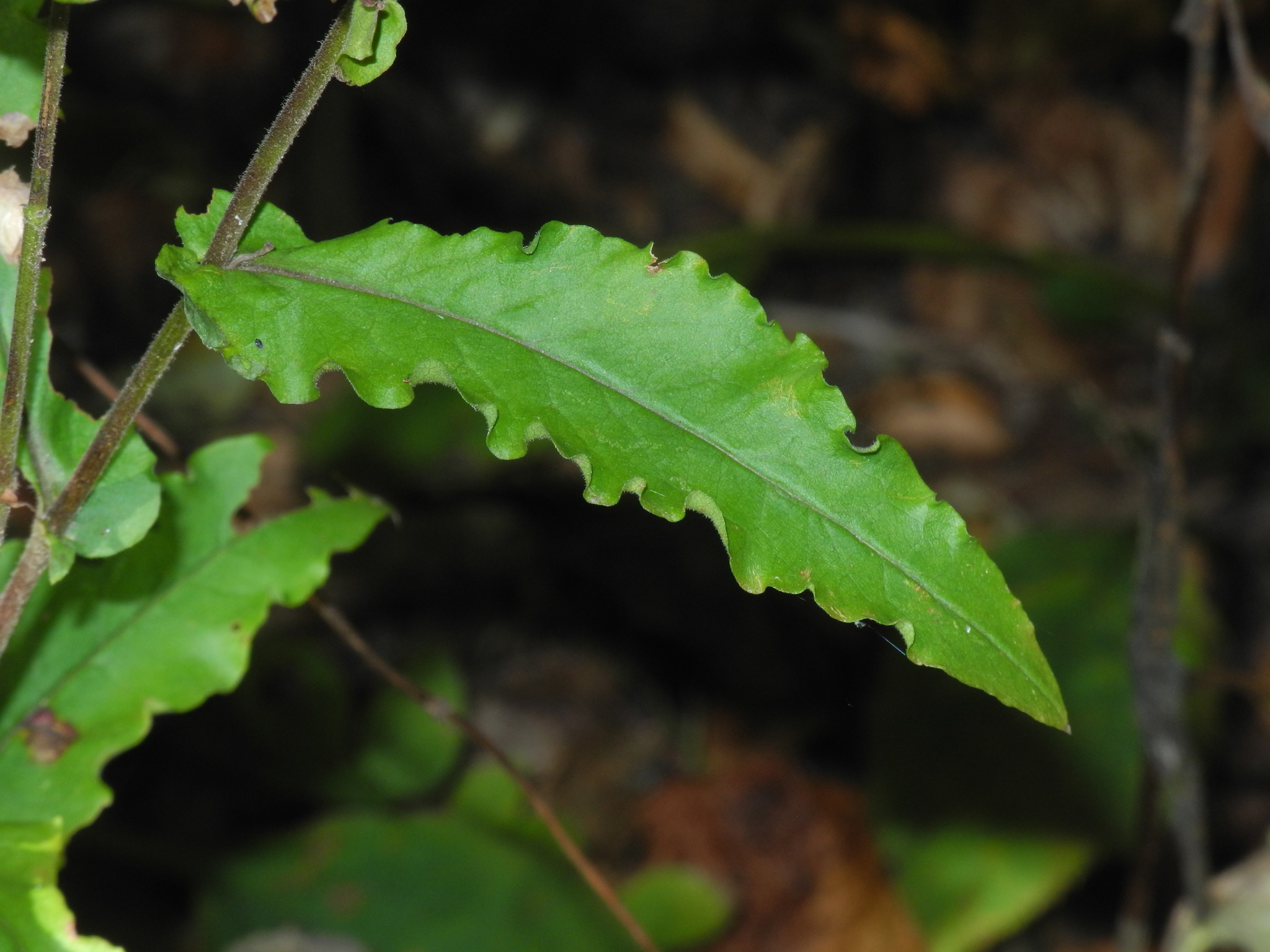

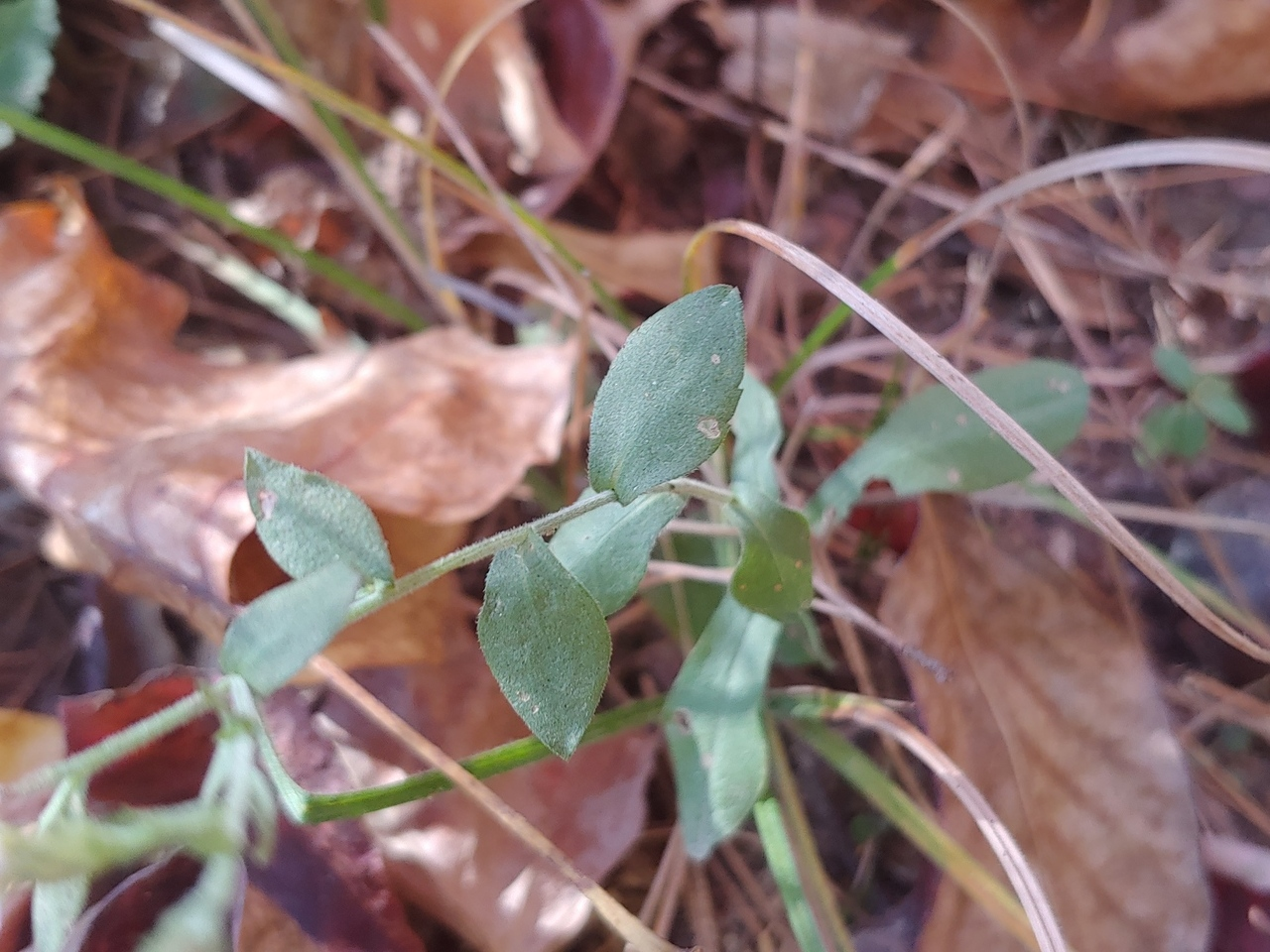

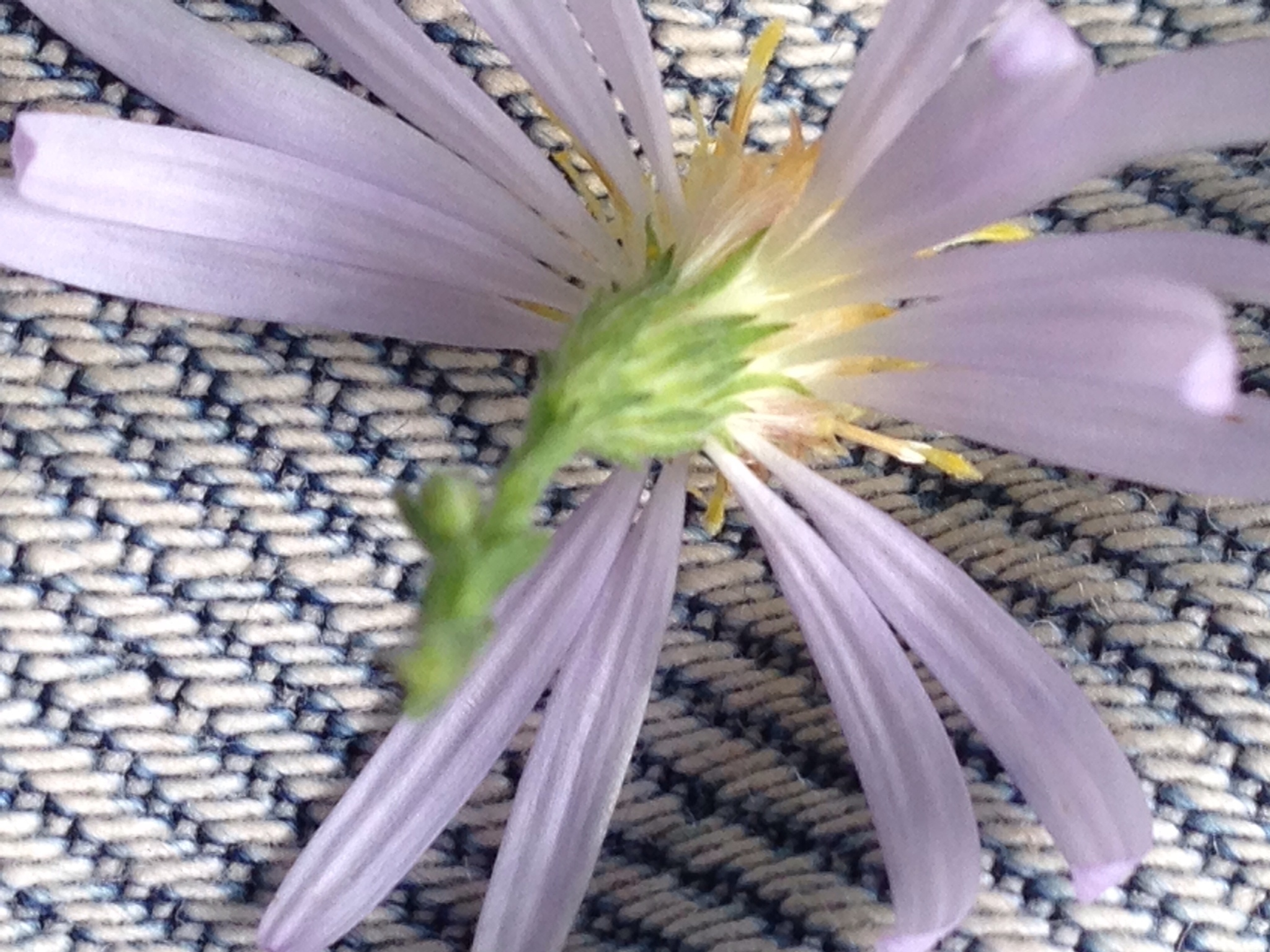

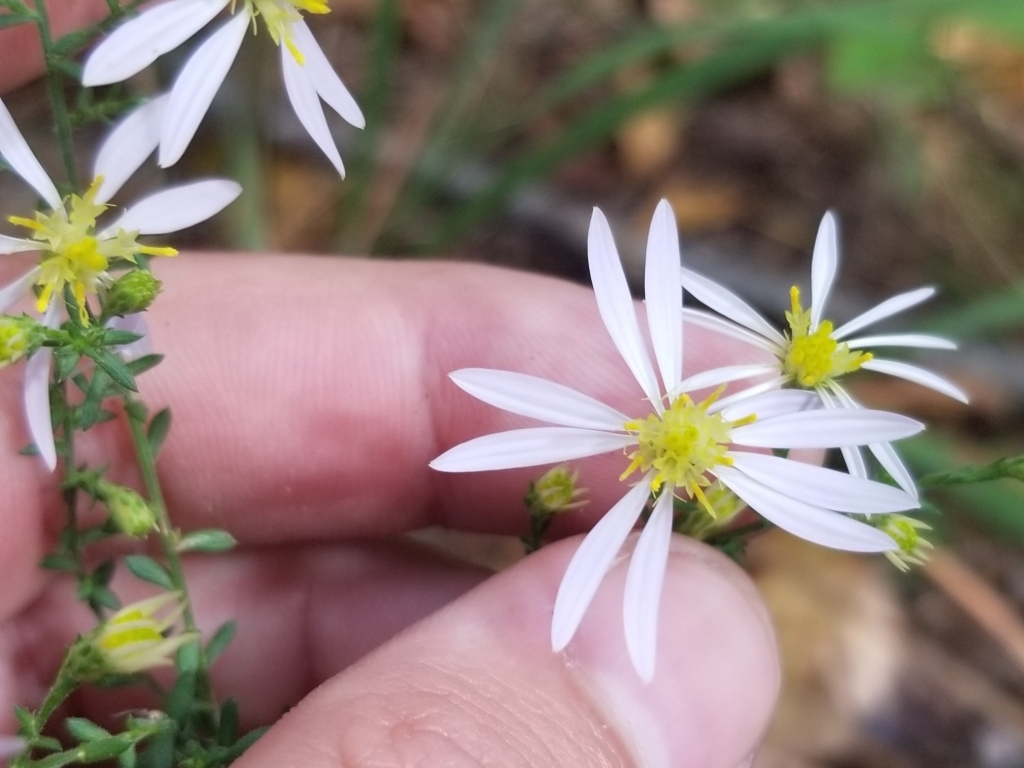

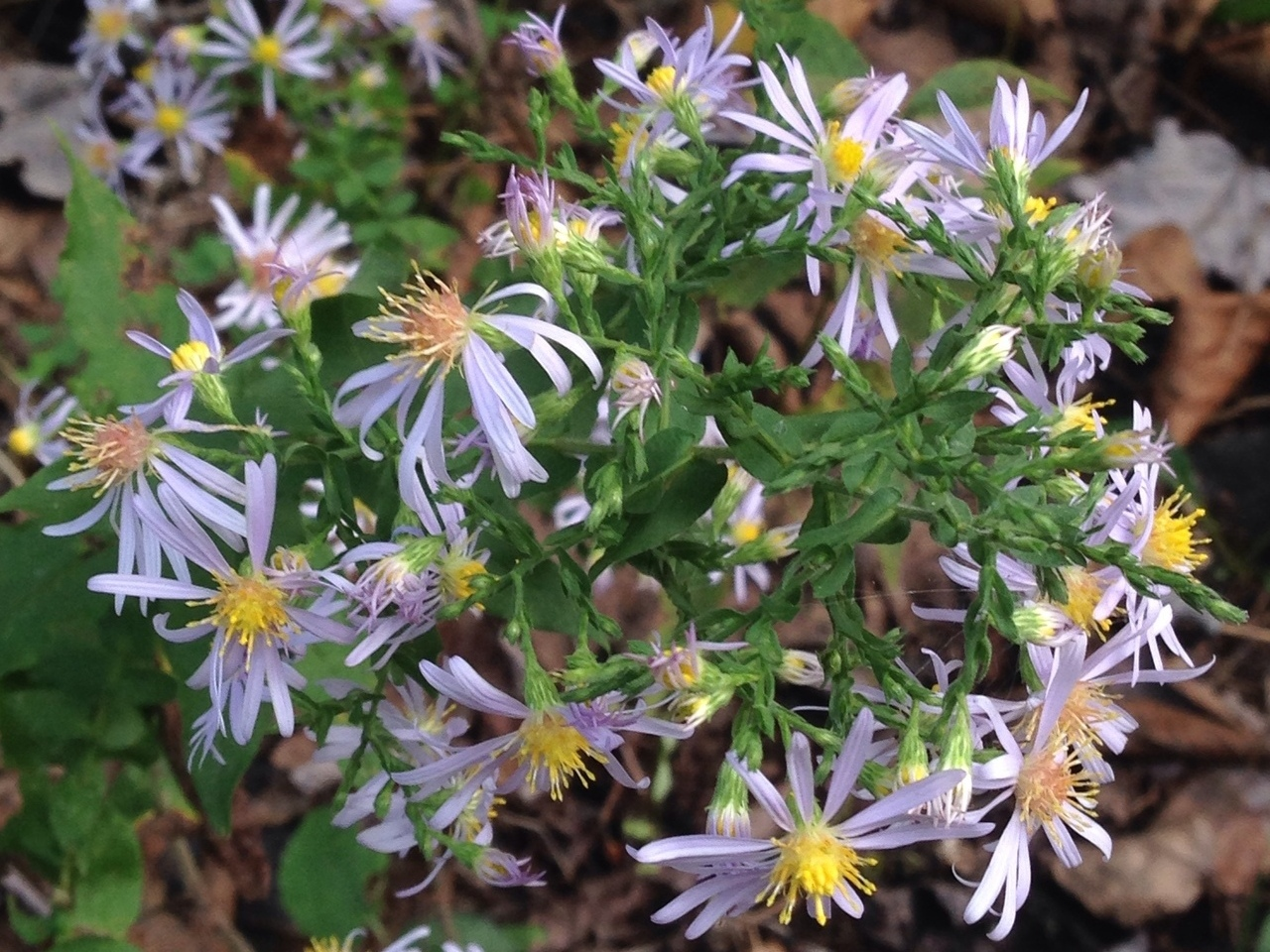

== Distribution and habitat ==
Symphyotrichum undulatum is native to the Canadian provinces of Nova Scotia and Ontario; and, the U.S. states of Alabama, Connecticut, Delaware, Florida, Georgia, Illinois, Indiana, Kentucky, Louisiana, Maine, Maryland, Massachusetts, Mississippi, New Hampshire, New Jersey, New York, North Carolina, Ohio, Pennsylvania, Rhode Island, South Carolina, Tennessee, Vermont, Virginia, and West Virginia, as well as in the District of Columbia.

It can be found at elevations between 200 and 1,500 meters (660 and 4,920 feet) in rocky or loamy soils, on sandhills, or on limestone- or sandstone-based bluffs.

== Conservation ==
As of October 2022, NatureServe listed S. undulatum as Secure (G5) globally; Secure (S5) in New Jersey, New York, North Carolina, and West Virginia; Apparently Secure (S4) in Virginia; Vulnerable (S3) in Indiana and Nova Scotia; and, Critically Imperiled (S1) in Illinois. The species' global status was last reviewed on 25 July 2016.
