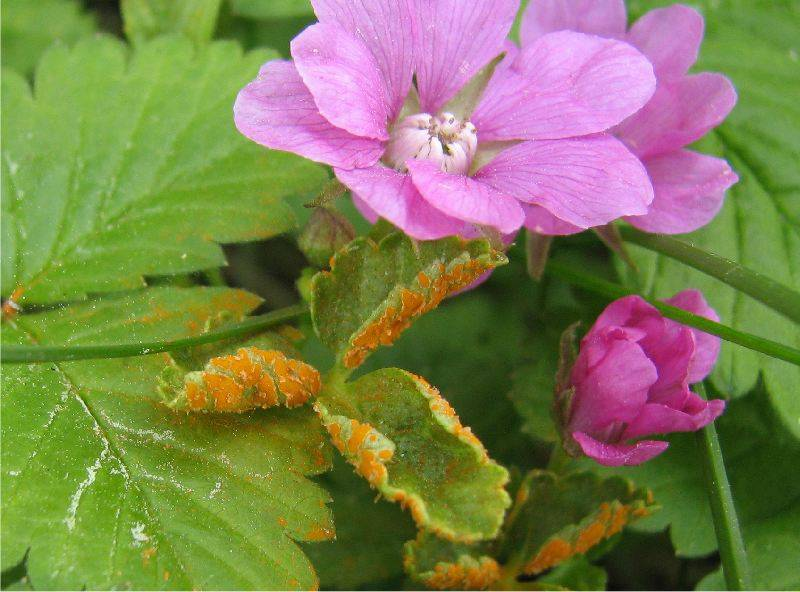
- Gymnoconia nitens growing on arctic bramble (Rubus arcticus).

Scientific classification
- Domain: Eukaryota
- Kingdom: Fungi
- Division: Basidiomycota
- Class: Pucciniomycetes
- Order: Pucciniales
- Family: Phragmidiaceae
- Genus: Gymnoconia; Lagerh. (1894)

Type species
- Gymnoconia interstitialis (Schltdl.) Lagerh. (1894)

Species
- Gymnoconia interstitialis; Gymnoconia nitens; Gymnoconia potentillae

Synonyms
- Kunkelia Arthur (1917)

= Gymnoconia =

Genus of fungi

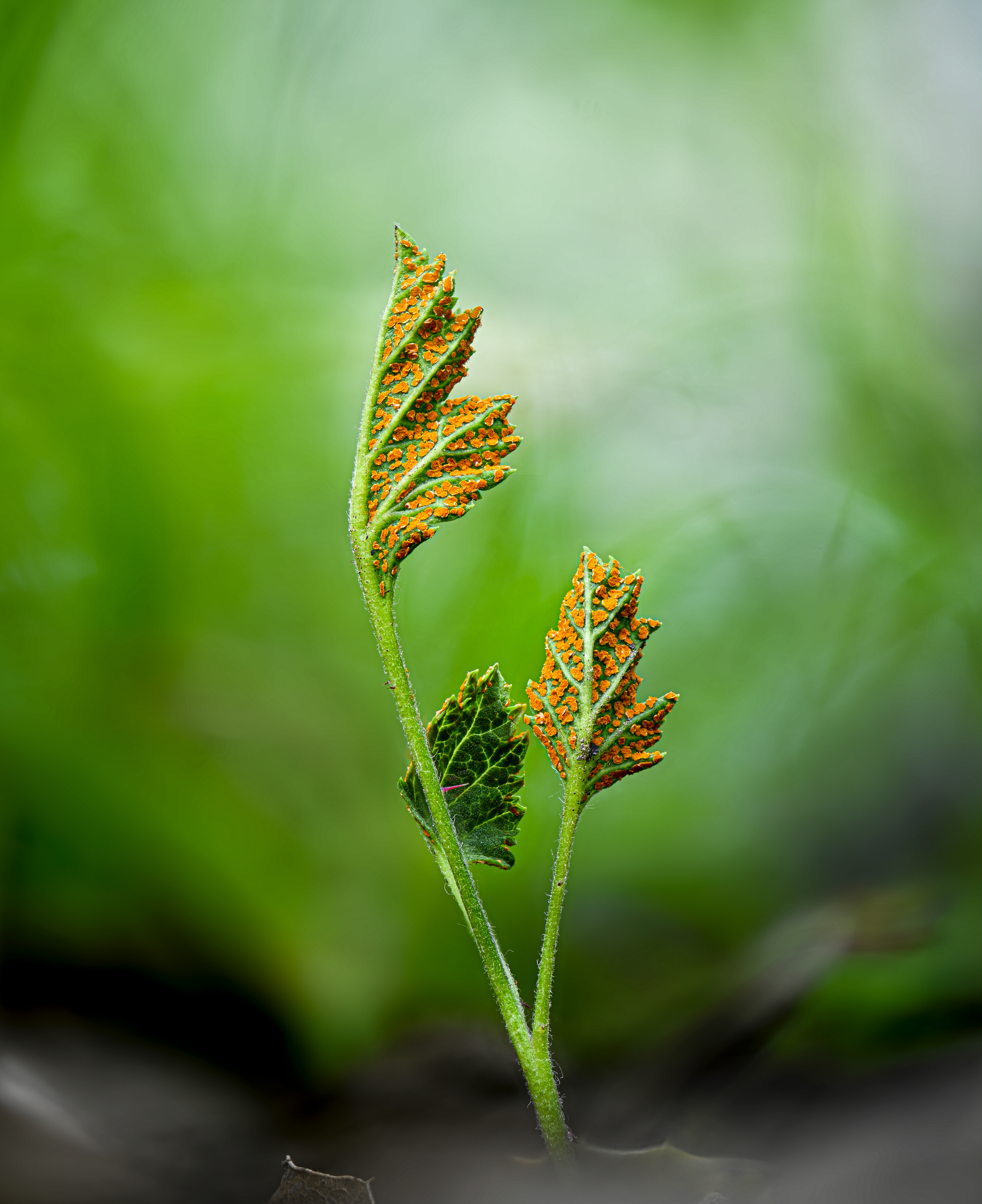
Gymnoconia on Rubus ursinus, at Wildcat Canyon in Alameda County, CA.

Gymnoconia is a genus of rust fungi in the family Phragmidiaceae. G. nitens causes an orange rust of Rubus species.
