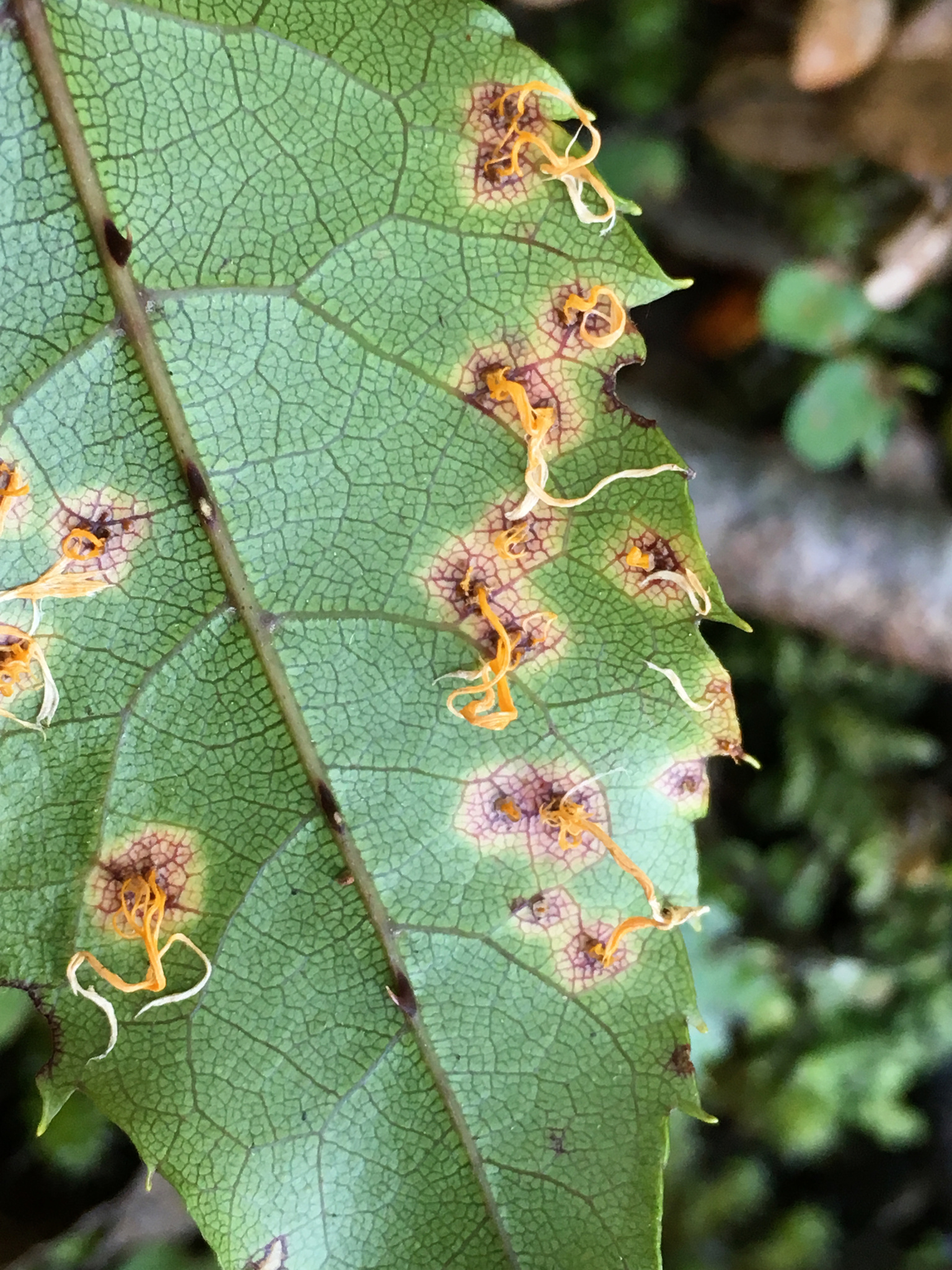
- Hamaspora australis

Scientific classification
- Domain: Eukaryota
- Kingdom: Fungi
- Division: Basidiomycota
- Class: Pucciniomycetes
- Order: Pucciniales
- Family: Phragmidiaceae
- Genus: Hamaspora; Körn. (1877)
- Species: H. longissima

Binomial name
- Hamaspora longissima (Thüm.) Körn. (1877)

Synonyms
- (Genus): Hamasporella Höhn. (1912)

= Hamaspora =

Genus of fungi

Hamaspora is a genus of rust fungi in the family Phragmidiaceae. The genus contains 14 species, which are known from Africa, Asia, and Australia.

== Species ==
- Hamaspora acutissima
- Hamaspora australis
- Hamaspora dobremezii
- Hamaspora engleriana
- Hamaspora gedeana
- Hamaspora hashiokai
- Hamaspora longissima
- Hamaspora nepalensis
- Hamaspora okinawensis
- Hamaspora ozeensis
- Hamaspora rubi-sieboldii
- Hamaspora sinica
- Hamaspora taiwaniana
- Hamaspora viennotii
