= Morispora =

Scientific classification
- Kingdom: Fungi
- Division: Basidiomycota
- Class: Pucciniomycetes
- Order: Pucciniales
- Family: Phragmidiaceae
- Genus: Morispora; Salazar-Yepes, Pardo-Card. & Buriticá (2007)

Type species
- Morispora tenella (H.S.Jacks. & Holw.) Salazar-Yepes, Pardo-Card. & Buriticá (2007)

Synonyms
- Mainsia tenella H.S.Jacks. & Holw. (1931); Gerwasia tenella (H.S.Jacks. & Holw.) Buriticá (1994)

Genus of fungi

The Morispora is a genus of rust fungi in the family Phragmidiaceae. The genus is monotypic, containing the single South American species Morispora tenella.
