= Scutelliformis =

Scientific classification
- Kingdom: Fungi
- Division: Basidiomycota
- Class: Pucciniomycetes
- Order: Pucciniales
- Family: Phragmidiaceae
- Genus: Scutelliformis; Salazar-Yepes, Pardo-Card. & Buriticá (2007)

Type species
- Scutelliformis bicornus Salazar-Yepes, Pardo-Card. & Buriticá (2007)

Genus of fungi

Scutelliformis is a genus of rust fungi in the family Phragmidiaceae. The genus is monotypic, containing the single species Scutelliformis bicornus.
