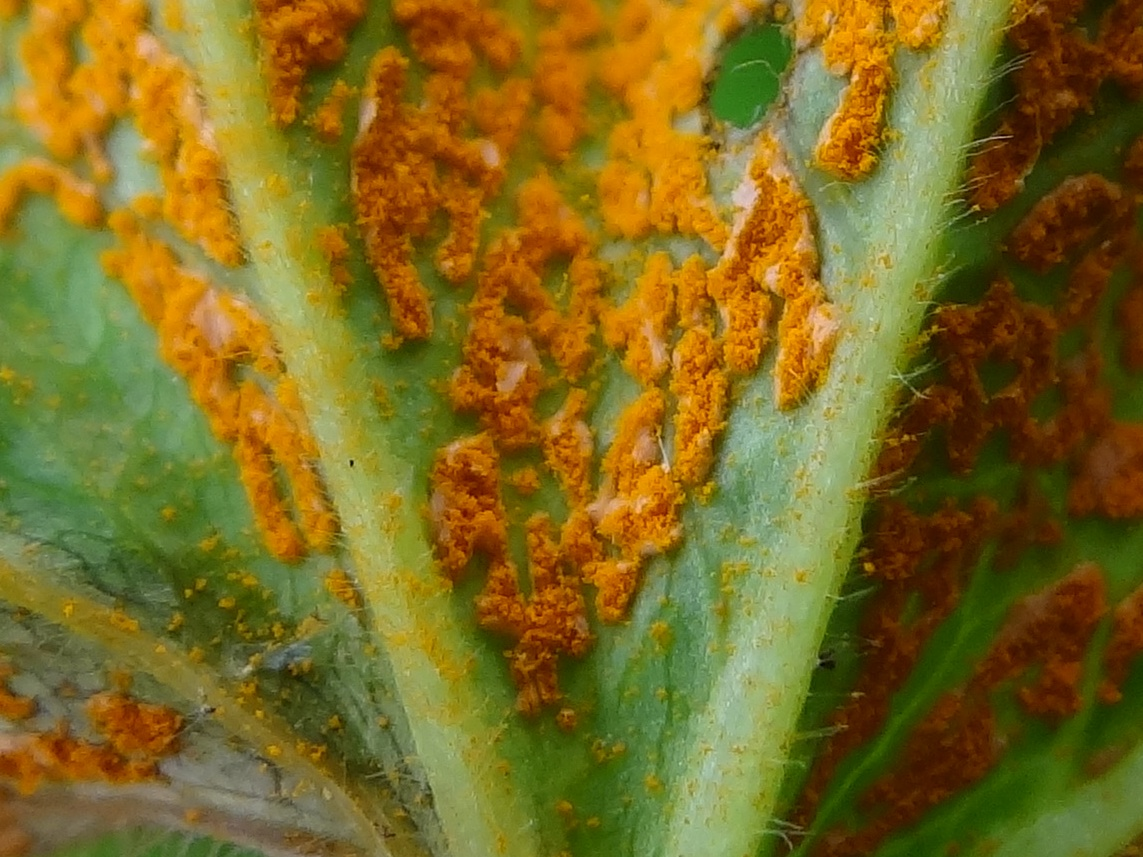

Scientific classification
- Kingdom: Fungi
- Division: Basidiomycota
- Class: Pucciniomycetes
- Order: Pucciniales
- Family: Phragmidiaceae
- Genus: Trachyspora; Fuckel (1861)

Type species
- Trachyspora alchemillae J.Schröt. (1861)

Species
- T. intrusa T. keniensis T. melospora T. pentaphylleae T. vestita T. wurthii

Synonyms
- Trachysporella Syd. (1921)

= Trachyspora =

Genus of fungi

Trachyspora is a genus of rust fungi in the family Phragmidiaceae. The genus, widespread in northern temperate areas, contains six species.
