= Joerstadia =

Scientific classification
- Kingdom: Fungi
- Division: Basidiomycota
- Class: Pucciniomycetes
- Order: Pucciniales
- Family: Phragmidiaceae
- Genus: Joerstadia; Gjaerum & Cummins (1982)

Type species
- Joerstadia alchemillae (Bacc.) Gjaerum & Cummins (1982)

Species
- J. alchemillae J. aliena J. keniensis J. patouillardii

Genus of fungi

Joerstadia is a genus of rust fungi in the family Phragmidiaceae. The genus contains four species known from Africa, including Madagascar, which grow on Alchemilla plants.
