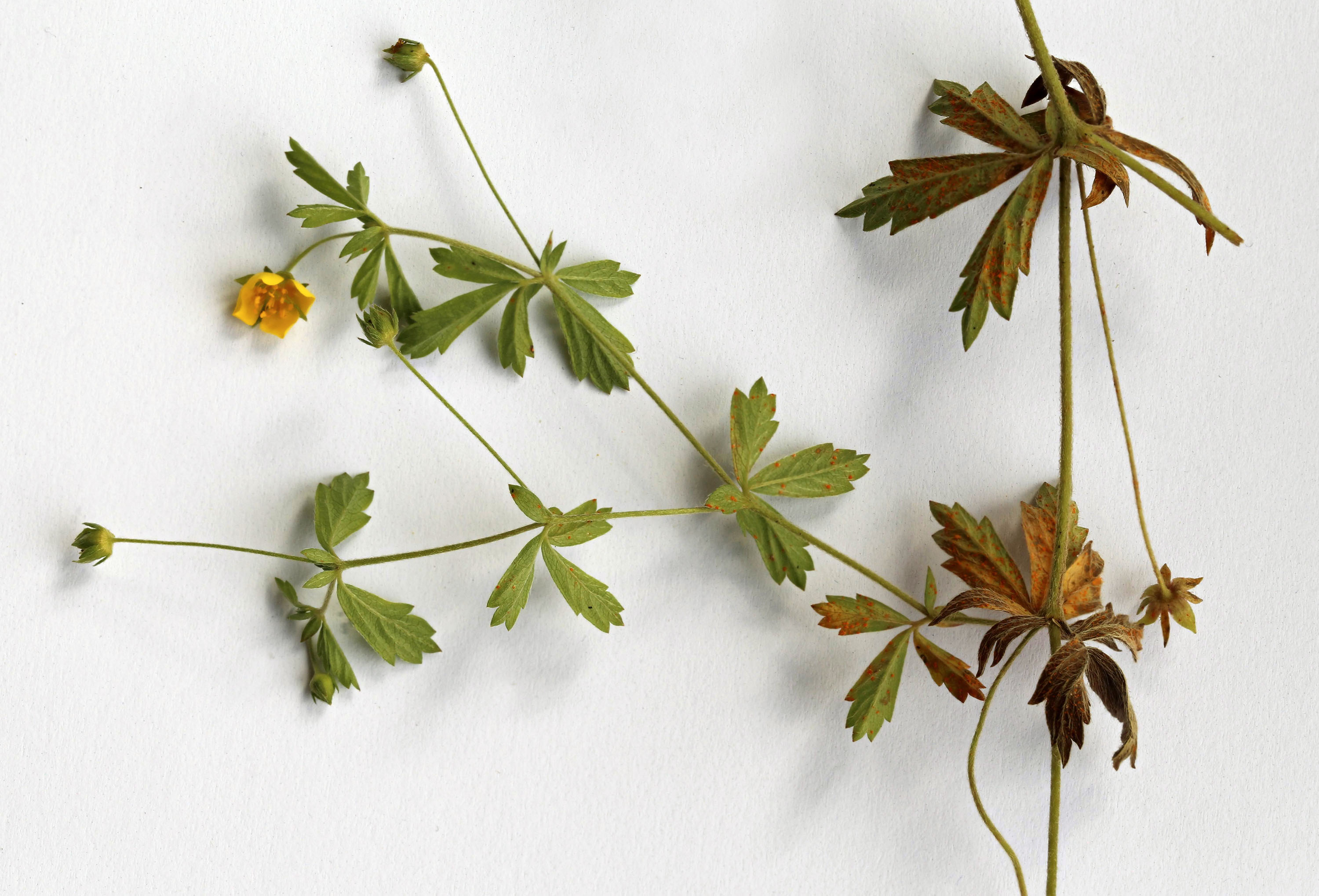
- Frommeëlla tormentillae on Potentilla erecta

Scientific classification
- Domain: Eukaryota
- Kingdom: Fungi
- Division: Basidiomycota
- Class: Pucciniomycetes
- Order: Pucciniales
- Family: Phragmidiaceae
- Genus: Frommeella; Cummins & Y.Hirats. (1983)

Type species
- Frommeella tormentillae (Fuckel) Cummins & Y. Hirats. (1983)

Species
- Frommeella mexicana; Frommeella tormentillae

= Frommeella =

Genus of fungi

Frommeella (Frommeëlla) is a genus of rust fungi in the family Phragmidiaceae. The widespread genus contains two species.

The genus name of Frommeella is in honour of Fred Denton Fromme (1886–1966), who was an American botanist (Mycology) and Professor of Botany at Virginia Polytechnic Institute.

The genus was circumscribed by George Baker Cummins and Yasuyuki Hiratsuka in Ill. Gen. Rust Fungi, rev. ed., Vol.120 on page 151 in 1983.
