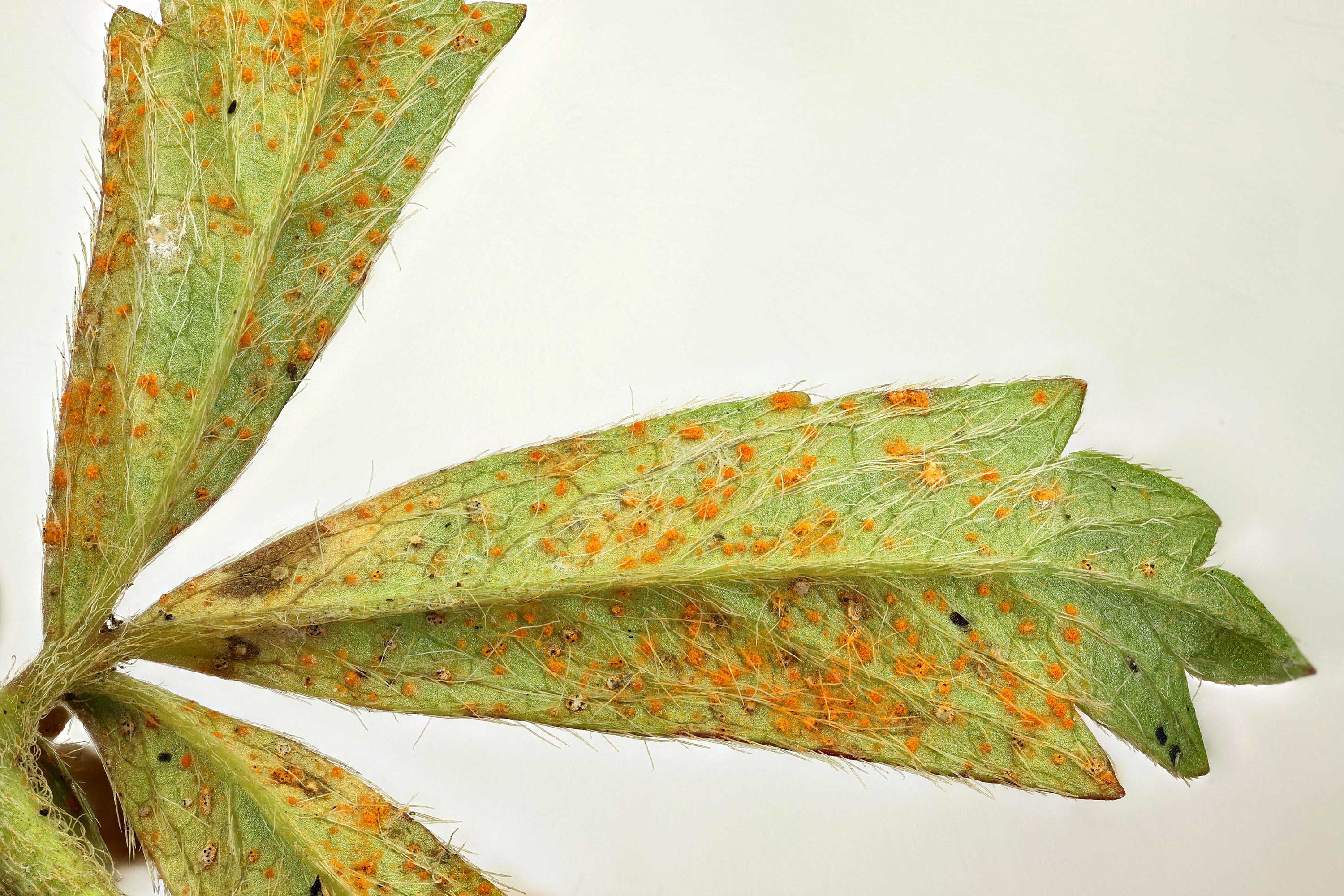
- Frommeëlla tormentillae on Potentilla erecta

Scientific classification
- Domain: Eukaryota
- Kingdom: Fungi
- Division: Basidiomycota
- Class: Pucciniomycetes
- Order: Pucciniales
- Family: Phragmidiaceae
- Genus: Frommeella
- Species: F. tormentillae

Binomial name
- Frommeella tormentillae (Fuckel) Cummins & Y. Hirats. (1983)

Synonyms
- List: Frommea obtusa (F.Strauss) Arthur (1917); Kuehneola tormentillae (Fuckel) Arthur (1904); Phragmidium potentillae sensu Mason &; Grainger [Cat. Yorks. Fungi p. 44 (1937)]; (2005); Phragmidium tormentillae Fuckel (1870); Uredo obtusa F.Strauss (1810)

= Frommeella tormentillae =

Species of fungus

Frommeella tormentillae is a species of rust fungus in the family Phragmidiaceae. It is a plant pathogen affecting the strawberry.

== See also ==
- List of strawberry diseases
