= Gerwasia =

Scientific classification
- Domain: Eukaryota
- Kingdom: Fungi
- Division: Basidiomycota
- Class: Pucciniomycetes
- Order: Pucciniales
- Family: Phragmidiaceae
- Genus: Gerwasia; Racib. (1909)

Type species
- Gerwasia rubi Racib. (1909)

Species
- See text

Synonyms
- Mainsia H.S.Jacks. (1931)

Genus of fungi

Gerwasia is a genus of rust fungi in the family Phragmidiaceae. Species in the genus grow on Rubus and Rosa plants.

== Species ==
- Gerwasia clara
- Gerwasia columbiensis
- Gerwasia cundinamarcensis
- Gerwasia epiphylla
- Gerwasia holwayi
- Gerwasia imperialis
- Gerwasia jeffersii
- Gerwasia lagerheimii
- Gerwasia mayorii
- Gerwasia peruviana
- Gerwasia pittieriana
- Gerwasia quitensis
- Gerwasia rosae
- Gerwasia rubi
- Gerwasia rubi-urticifolii
- Gerwasia standleyi
- Gerwasia tayronensis
- Gerwasia variabilis
