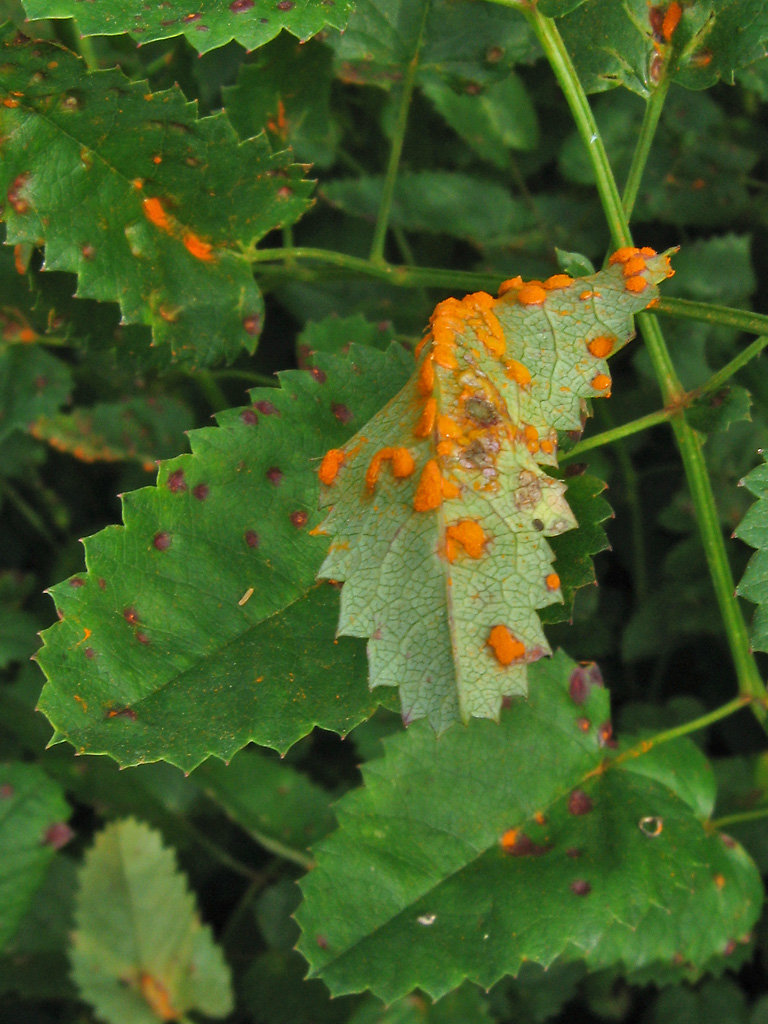
- Xenodochus carbonarius

Scientific classification
- Kingdom: Fungi
- Division: Basidiomycota
- Class: Pucciniomycetes
- Order: Pucciniales
- Family: Phragmidiaceae
- Genus: Xenodochus; Schlechtendal

= Xenodochus (fungus) =

Genus of fungi

Xenodochus is a genus of rust fungus in the family Phragmidiaceae, containing the following species:

- Xenodochus minor
- Xenodochus carbonarius, Schltdl., 1826 (Great Burnet Rust)

Both species parasitise members of the Rose family in the genus Sanguisorba, but the genus has a highly discontinuous distribution, with X. minor known from sub-arctic Alaska and X. carbonarius from Europe.
