= Elliot Calvin Howe =

American botanist (1828–1899)

- Born: February 14, 1828; Jamaica, Vermont
- Died: March 2, 1899 (Aged 71); Lansingburgh, New York
- Scientific career
- Fields: Botanist

Elliot Calvin Howe (February 14, 1828 – March 2, 1899) was an American botanist and a member of the Torrey Botanical Club. Most notably, he discovered several species of fungi throughout his life, including Tricholoma Peckii, Hygrophorus Peckianus, Puccinia curtipes, P. Peckianus, Microsphaera menispermi, M. platani and M. symphoricarpi, and two were named after him to commemorate his contributions to the field, Stropharia Howeanum Pk. and Hypoxylon Howeanum Pk.

== See also ==
- Category:Taxa named by Elliot Calvin Howe
