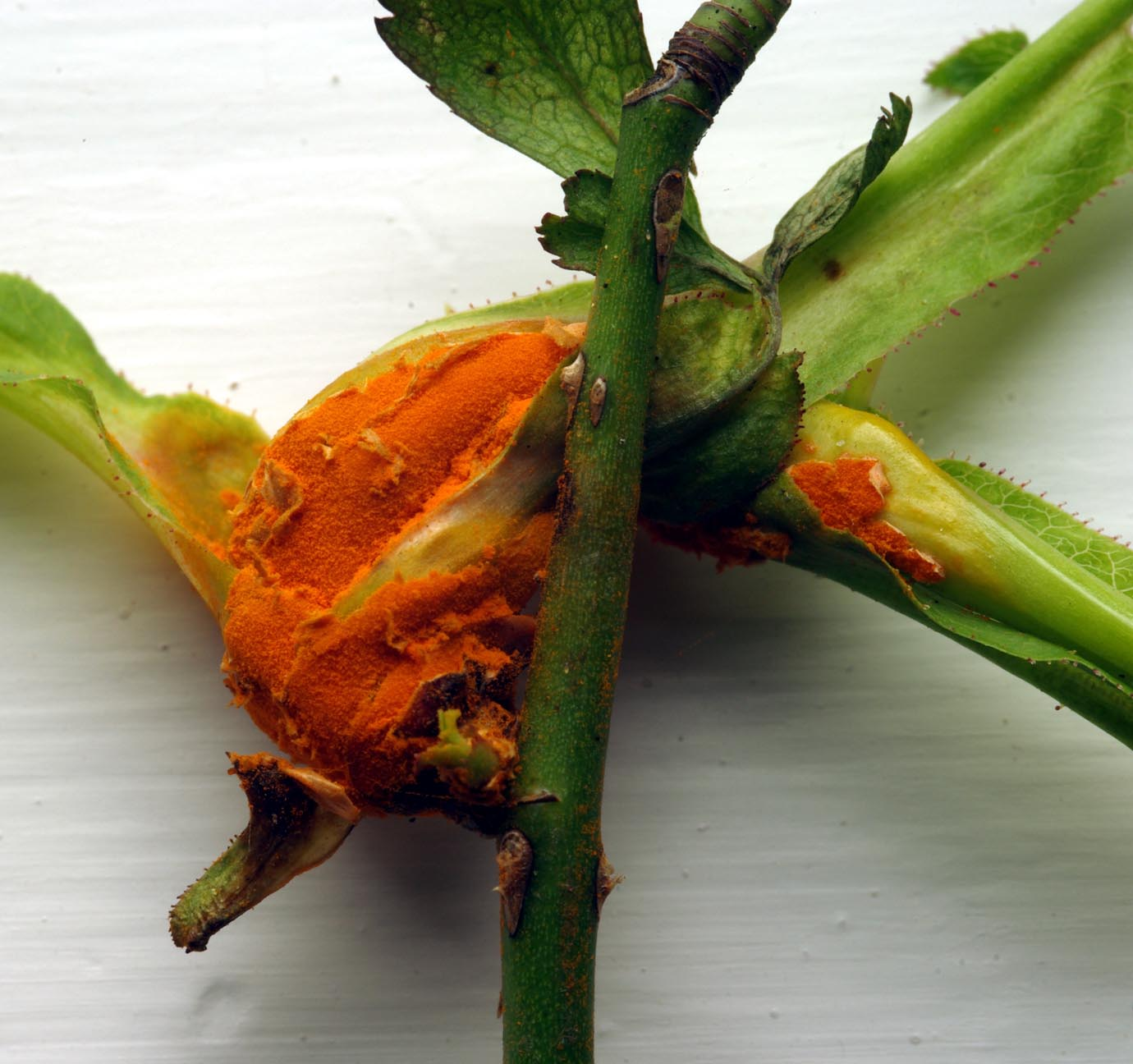
- Phragmidium species on Rosa

Scientific classification
- Kingdom: Fungi
- Division: Basidiomycota
- Class: Pucciniomycetes
- Order: Pucciniales
- Family: Phragmidiaceae; Corda (1837)

Type genus
- Phragmidium Link (1815)

= Phragmidiaceae =

Family of fungi

The Phragmidiaceae are a family of rust fungi in the order Pucciniales. The family contains 14 genera and 164 species.

== Genera ==
- Arthuriomyces
- Frommeella
- Gerwasia
- Gymnoconia
- Hamaspora
- Joerstadia
- Kuehneola
- Mainsia
- Morispora
- Phragmidium
- Physonema
- Scutelliformis
- Trachyspora
- Xenodochus
