= List of caneberries diseases =

This article is a list of diseases of caneberries (Rubus spp.).

== Bacterial diseases ==
Bacterial diseases
Crown and cane gall	Agrobacterium tumefaciens Agrobacterium rubi
Fire blight	Erwinia amylovora
Hairy root	Agrobacterium rhizogenes
Leafy gall	Rhodococcus fascians = Corynebacterium fascians
Pseudomonas blight	Pseudomonas syringae

== Fungal diseases ==
Fungal diseases
Anthracnose	Elsinoë veneta Sphaceloma necator [anamorph]
Armillaria root rot Shoestring root rot	Armillaria mellea Rhizomorpha subcorticalis [anamorph]
Ascospora dieback	Clethridium corticola = Discostroma corticola = Ascospora ruborum Seimatosporium lichenicola [anamorph]
Blackberry rust	Phragmidium violaceum
Black rot	Phyllosticta carpogena
Blotch	Mycosphaerella confusa Pseudocercospora rubi [anamorph] = Cercospora rubi
Blotch, purple	Septocyta ruborum = Rhabdospora ramealis
Botryosphaeria cane canker (blackberry)	Botryosphaeria dothidea Fusicoccum aesculi [anamorph]
Botrytis fruit rot and blossom blight = gray mold	Botrytis cinerea Botryotinia fuckeliana [teleomorph]
Boysenberry decline	Cercosporella rubi
Cane and leaf rust	Kuehneola uredinis
Cane blight	Diapleella coniothyrium = Leptosphaeria coniothyrium Coniothyrium fuckelii [anamorph]
Cane Botrytis	Botrytis cinerea Botryotinia fuckeliana [teleomorph]
Downy mildew = dryberry	Peronospora sparsa = Peronospora rubi
Dryberry disease (loganberry)	Monilinia rubi (plus dryberry mite, see under miscellaneous disorders)
Fruit rots, minor	Alternaria spp. Cladosporium spp. Colletotrichum gloeosporioides Colletotrichum acutatum Penicillium spp.
Gnomonia cane canker	Gnomonia rubi
Late leaf rust	Pucciniastrum americanum Pucciniastrum arcticum
Leaf spots	Discohainesia oenotherae Hainesia lythri [anamorph] Mycosphaerella spp. Phyllosticta spp.
Nectria canker (raspberry)	Nectria mammoidea var. rubi Cylindrocarpon ianthothele var. ianthothele [anamorph]
Orange rust	Arthuriomyces peckianus (long-cycled rust); Gymnoconia nitens (short-cycled rust)
Phytophthora root rot	Phytophthora spp. Phytophthora fragariae var. rubi Phytophthora megasperma Phytophthora cactorum Phytophthora citricola Phytophthora cryptogea Phytophthora drechsleri Phytophthora cambivora Phytophthora cinnamomi Phytophthora erythroseptica
Post harvest soft rot = leak disease	Rhizopus stolonifer = Rhizopus nigricans Mucor piriformis
Powdery mildew	Podosphaera ruborum Podosphaera rubi-spectabilis
Raspberry leaf spot	Sphaerulina rubi Septoria darrowii [anamorph] = Cylindrosporium rubi
Root rot	Collybia dryophila Cylindrocarpon destructans Fusarium spp. Helicobasidium brebissonii Rhizoctonia crocorum [anamorph] Phymatotrichopsis omnivora = Phymatotrichum omnivorum Pythium spp. Rhizoctonia spp.
Rosette = double blossom	Cercosporella rubi
Septoria leaf spot (blackberry) = cane and leaf spot	Septoria rubi Mycosphaerella rubi [teleomorph]
Silver leaf	Chondrostereum purpureum = Stereum purpureum
Spur blight	Didymella applanata Phoma sp. [anamorph]
Stamen blight	Hapalosphaeria deformans
Sydowiella cane canker	Sydowiella depressula = Gnomonia depressula
Yellow rust	Phragmidium rubi-idaei = Phragmidium imitans
Verticillium wilt	Verticillium albo-atrum Verticillium dahliae
White root rot	Vararia sp.

== Nematodes, parasitic ==
Nematodes, parasitic
Dagger, American nematode	Xiphinema americanum
Dagger nematode	Xiphinema bakeri Xiphinema rivesi
Root-lesion nematode	Pratylenchus spp. Pratylenchus penetrans
Needle nematode	Longidorus spp.

== Virus and viruslike agents ==
Virus and viruslike agents
Mosaic or ringspot	genus Ilarvirus, Apple mosaic virus (ApMV)
Tobacco ringspot in Rubus	genus Nepovirus, Tobacco ringspot virus (TRSV)
Black raspberry streak	A graft-transmissible virus
Blackberry calico	genus Carlavirus, Blackberry calico virus (BCV) in North America. genus Potexvirus, Wineberry latent virus (WLV) upon inoculation in the U.K.
Bramble yellow mosaic	genus Potyvirus, Bramble yellow mosaic virus (BrmYMV)
European decline	genus Nepovirus, Cherry leaf roll virus (CLRV)
Green blotch	genus Cucumovirus, Cucumber mosaic virus (CMV)
Latent virus, North America	genus Ilarvirus, Tobacco streak virus (Rubus strain) (TSV-R)
Latent virus, Europe	genus Potexvirus, Wineberry latent virus (WLV)
North American raspberry decline	genus Nepovirus, Tomato ringspot virus (TomRSV) or genus Nepovirus, Cherry rasp leaf virus (CRLV)
Raspberry bushy dwarf	genus Ideaovirus, Raspberry bushy dwarf virus (RBDV)
Raspberry mosaic	In North America caused by complexes of: Rubus yellow net virus (RYNV); black raspberry necrosis virus (BRNV); and an unnamed isometric virus similar to raspberry leaf mottle virus (RLMV)
Raspberry ringspot	Caused by either genus Nepovirus, Raspberry ringspot virus (RRSV) or genus Nepovirus tomato black ring virus (TBRV)
Raspberry vein chlorosis	Raspberry vein chlorosis virus (RVCV)
Raspberry veinbanding mosaic	Caused by RYNV + RLMV; additionally raspberry leaf spot virus (RLSV), uncharacterized, may occur with this complex
Raspberry yellow dwarf	Caused by either genus Nepovirus, Arabis mosaic virus (ArMV) or genus Nepovirus, Strawberry latent ringspot virus (SLRV)
Raspberry yellow spot	Raspberry yellow spot (virus-like agent of unknown relationship)
Thimbleberry ringspot	genus Ilarvirus, Apple mosaic virus

== Phytoplasmla and spiroplasmal diseases ==
Phytoplasmla and spiroplasmal diseases
Black raspberry witches'-broom	Phytoplasma
Rubus stunt	Rubus stunt phytoplasma

== Miscellaneous diseases and disorders ==
Miscellaneous diseases and disorders
Alpine mosaic in Rubus	Alpine mosaic agent, (a graft-transmissible agent of unknown identity)
Blackberry sterility	Cause unknown
Brown berry disease (of black raspberry)	Cause unknown
Crumbly berries	Various causes: poor pollination, genetic, virus, insect, nutrition, winter injury, water relations
Dryberry disease (loganberry)	Phyllocoptes gracilis (dryberry mite) and Rhizoctonia rubi
Fasciation	Cause unknown
Midge blight	Phoma macrostoma var. macrostoma Fusarium culmorum Alternaria spp. colonization following feeding by Resseliella theoboldi (raspberry cane midge)
Raspberry leaf curl	Raspberry leaf curl uncharacterized agent(s)
Redberry disease	Acalitus essigi (redberry mite)
Seedborne dsRNA in wild raspberry	dsRNA of mol. wt. typical of plant viruses, but not associated with host symptoms or virus-like particles
