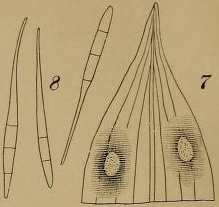
- Cercosporella veratri Peck. Fig. 7. Upper part of a leaf with two fungous spots. Fig. 8. Three spores x400.

Scientific classification
- Domain: Eukaryota
- Kingdom: Fungi
- Division: Ascomycota
- Class: Dothideomycetes
- Order: Capnodiales
- Family: Mycosphaerellaceae
- Genus: Cercosporella; Saccardo

= Cercosporella =

Genus of fungi

Cercosporella is a fungus genus in the family Mycosphaerellaceae.

It has a cosmopolitan distribution worldwide.

== Species ==
As accepted by Species Fungorum;

- Cercosporella acroptili (Bremer) U. Braun (1993)
- Cercosporella aesculi Y. Harada & Katsuki (1976)
- Cercosporella ambrosiae-artemisiifoliae U. Braun & Urtiaga (2013)
- Cercosporella anamirtae Hosag. & R.K. Verma (1992)
- Cercosporella antirrhini Wakef. (1918)
- Cercosporella apocyni (Ellis & Kellerm.) Trel. (1885)
- Cercosporella azimae Thirum. & Naras. (1950)
- Cercosporella babajaniae Osipian (1975)
- Cercosporella barnadesiae Petr. (1950)
- Cercosporella bonteae Manoliu & Mítítíuc (1976)
- Cercosporella boutelouae R. Sprague & Rogerson (1959)
- Cercosporella bundelkhandae (S. Shrivast., N. Verma & A.N. Rai) Raghv. Singh, S.K. Verma, S. Yadav & Sh. Kumar (2020)
- Cercosporella cardariae Vasyag. (1973)
- Cercosporella catenulata Videira & Crous (2016)
- Cercosporella centaureicola Berner, U. Braun & Eskand. (2006)
- Cercosporella cerastii Vasyag. (1973)
- Cercosporella cimicifugae H.D. Shin & U. Braun (2000)
- Cercosporella convallariae Sawada (1958)
- Cercosporella coorgica Muthappa (1968)
- Cercosporella crambes Annal. (1981)
- Cercosporella dioscoreae Sawada (1958)
- Cercosporella dioscoreophylli (Henn.) Deighton (1973)
- Cercosporella dolichandrae Crous & den Breeÿen (2014)
- Cercosporella echii Syd. (1921)
- Cercosporella endecaphyllae T.S. Ramakr. & Sundaram (1955)
- Cercosporella equiseti (C. Massal.) U. Braun (1992)
- Cercosporella eremodauci Annal. (1972)
- Cercosporella eryngii Vasyag. & Pisareva (1973)
- Cercosporella eupatorii Sawada ex Goh & W.H. Hsieh (1990)
- Cercosporella euphorbiacearum Siboe & J.C. David (2000)
- Cercosporella filicis-feminae (Bres.) Höhn. (1924)
- Cercosporella heterospora (Ellis & Everh.) U. Braun (1990)
- Cercosporella holostei Golovin (1950)
- Cercosporella indica T.K.S. Singh (1962)
- Cercosporella indigofericola U. Braun (1994)
- Cercosporella iridis Annal. (1972)
- Cercosporella isatidis Melnik (1971)
- Cercosporella jaapiana (Magnus) Andrian. & Minter (2011)
- Cercosporella junci MacGarvie & O'Rourke (1969)
- Cercosporella justiciae S. Ahmad (1967)
- Cercosporella karelii Bremer & Petr. (1947)
- Cercosporella leuzeae (Sandu) U. Braun (1993)
- Cercosporella lewisii (Savile) U. Braun (1992)
- Cercosporella libanotidis Vasyag. & Pisareva (1973)
- Cercosporella lindaviana (Jaap) U. Braun (1992)
- Cercosporella millettiae Haldar & J.B. Ray (2009)
- Cercosporella moelleri N.F. Buchw. (1958)
- Cercosporella myosotidis Buchalo (1961)
- Cercosporella oxalidis Grove (1922)
- Cercosporella palustris R. Sprague (1962)
- Cercosporella pantoleuca (Sacc.) Sacc. (1881)
- Cercosporella pergulariae U. Braun (1999)
- Cercosporella peristrophes Syd. (1933)
- Cercosporella pfaffiae Deighton (1973)
- Cercosporella phlomidis N.P. Golovina (1960)
- Cercosporella physospermi Annal. (1972)
- Cercosporella primulae Allesch. (1892)
- Cercosporella pseudachyranthis (R.F. Castañeda & U. Braun) U. Braun (2015)
- Cercosporella ptarmicae (Lindau) U. Braun (1992)
- Cercosporella rhois Sawada (1958)
- Cercosporella rubi (G. Winter) Plakidas (1937)
- Cercosporella telosmae Deighton (1973)
- Cercosporella tephrosiae H.C. Greene (1959)
- Cercosporella thespesiae Thirum. & Naras. (1950)
- Cercosporella thladianthae R. Kirschner (2007)
- Cercosporella thunbergiae Hansf. (1944)
- Cercosporella tinosporae (Lacy & Thirum.) Deighton (1973)
- Cercosporella toxicodendri (Ellis) U. Braun (1998)
- Cercosporella ugandensis Deighton (1973)
- Cercosporella virgaureae (Thüm.) Allesch. (1895)
- Cercosporella yadavii Deighton (1973)

Former species (note all are Mycosphaerellaceae unless noted;

- C. acalyphae Lacy & Thirum. (1951) = Pseudocercospora acalyphae
- C. acerina (R. Hartig) G. Arnaud (1952) = Mycocentrospora acerina, Pleosporales
- C. aceris Dearn. & Barthol. (1917) = Xenostigmina aceris, Pseudodidymellaceae
- C. achilleae Jaap (1907) = Cercospora achilleae
- C. adoxae E. Bommer & M. Rousseau (1884) = Ramularia adoxae
- C. albomaculans (Ellis & Everh.) Sacc. (1895) = Neopseudocercosporella capsellae
- C. alni Dearn. & Barthol. (1917) = Mycopappus alni, Sclerotiniaceae
- C. angustana Ferraris (1912) = Pseudocercosporella angustana
- C. aquatilis (Peck) Gonz. Frag. (1917) = Doassansiopsis hydrophila, Doassansiopsidaceae
- C. aronicicola Volkart (1903) = Pseudocercosporella aronicicola
- C. atropunctata Racib. (1900) = Passalora atropunctata
- C. beckeropsidis Hansf. (1944) = Ramularia beckeropsidis
- C. brassicae Jaap (1916) = Neopseudocercosporella capsellae
- C. brassicae Jaap (1922) = Neopseudocercosporella capsellae
- C. brassicae (Fautrey & Roum.) Höhn. (1924) = Neopseudocercosporella capsellae,
- C. bromi R. Sprague (1937) = Ramulispora bromi
- C. bromivora Latch (1965) = Spermospora bromivora, Ascomycota
- C. cadabae S. Ahmad (1961) = Pseudocercospora ahmadiana
- C. calthae Lebedeva (1933) = Cercoseptoria calthae
- C. cana (Sacc.) Sacc. (1880) = Cercosporella virgaureae
- C. caryigena (Ellis & Everh.) Höhn. (1924) = Mycosphaerella caryigena
- C. celtidis (Ellis & Kellerm.) Davis (1924) = Pseudocercosporella celtidis
- C. cerasella (Sacc.) Jacz. (1903) = Mycosphaerella cerasella
- C. chaenomelis Y. Suto (1999) = Sphaerulina chaenomelis
- C. chaerophylli Aderh. (1903) = Passalora chaerophylli
- C. chalcanthi Annal. (1972) = Pseudocercosporella chalcanthi
- C. chionea (Ellis & Kellerm.) Sacc. (1886) = Passalora chionea
- C. conringiae Annal. (1972) = Neopseudocercosporella capsellae
- C. cryptosporae Byzova (1973) = Pseudocercosporella cryptosporae
- C. cytisi Jaap (1915) = Pseudocercosporella cytisi
- C. delicatissima (Kalchbr. & Cooke) Chupp (1948) = Passalora delicatissima
- C. dominicana Cif. & Gonz. Frag. (1926) = Pseudocercospora dominicana
- C. dominicana Petr. & Cif. (1932) = Pseudocercospora dominicana
- C. ekebergiae Syd. & P. Syd. (1914) = Phaeophloeosporella ekebergiae, Ascomycota
- C. elata Sacc. (1910) = Passalora elata
- C. eleonorae-reginae (Bubák & Kabát) Höhn. (1924) = Pseudocercosporella eleonorae-reginae
- C. exilis Davis (1915) = Ramularia davisiana
- C. filiformis Davis (1915) = Pseudocercospora filiformis
- C. fraserae (Ellis & Everh.) Sacc. (1895) = Pseudocercospora fraserae
- C. geranii W.B. Cooke & C.G. Shaw (1952) = Pseudophaeoramularia geranii
- C. goldbachiae Annal. (1972) = Neopseudocercosporella capsellae
- C. gossypii Speg. (1886) = Ramularia gossypii
- C. guaranitica Speg. (1888) = Eriomycopsis guaranitica, Ascomycota
- C. haloragis Hansf. (1956) = Pseudocercospora haloragis
- C. helianthellae Ellis & Everh. (1897) = Pseudocercosporella helianthellae
- C. herpotrichoides Fron (1912) = Oculimacula yallundae, Ploettnerulaceae
- C. hieracii Jaap (1907) = Pseudocercosporella hieracii
- C. holci R. Sprague (1937) = Spermospora holci, Ascomycota
- C. hungarica Bäumler (1888) = Pseudocercosporella hungarica
- C. hurae Linder & Whetzel (1937) = Calonectria hurae, Nectriaceae
- C. inconspicua (G. Winter) Höhn. (1903) = Pseudocercosporella inconspicua
- C. indigoferae Hansf. (1947) = Cercosporella indigofericola
- C. juglandis Kaz. Itô & Tak. Kobay. (1957) = Pseudocercosporella juglandis
- C. koelpiniae Annal. (1972) = Pseudocercosporella koelpiniae
- C. leptosperma (Peck) Davis (1919) = Pseudocercosporella leptosperma
- C. leucadis Uppal, Patel & V.P. Bhide (1950) = Pseudocercospora leucadis
- C. leucaenae (Raghu Ram & Mallaiah) U. Braun (1995) = Passalora leucaenae
- C. linariae Baudyš & Picb. (1936) = Mycocentrospora linariae, Pleosporales
- C. litvinoviae Annal. (1972) = Neopseudocercosporella capsellae
- C. maculans (Bérenger) F.A. Wolf (1935) = Neophloeospora maculans
- C. magnusiana Allesch. (1892) = Pseudocercosporella magnusiana
- C. malcolmiae Annal. (1972) = Neopseudocercosporella capsellae
- C. mimosae Pat. (1893) = Pseudocercospora mimosae
- C. mogiphanes Speg. (1910) = Pseudocercospora mogiphanes
- C. narcissi Boud. (1901) = Pseudocercosporella narcissi
- C. nesliae Dearn. & Bisby (1929) = Neopseudocercosporella capsellae
- C. nesliana Baudyš & Picb. (1924) = Neopseudocercosporella capsellae
- C. nicolai Bubák (1903) = Pseudocercosporella nicolai
- C. nivea Ellis & Barthol. (1896) = Pseudocercosporella nivea
- C. nivosa Ellis & Everh. (1895) = Ramularia nivosa
- C. pastinacae P. Karst. (1884) = Filiella pastinacae
- C. peristrophes var. microspora N.D. Sharma & R.P. Mishra (1977) = Cercosporella peristrophes
- C. peronosporoides Speg. (1899) = Pseudocercospora spegazziniana
- C. persicae (Sacc.) Sacc. (1880) = Mycosphaerella pruni-persicae
- C. poagena R. Sprague (1942) = Spermospora poagena, Ascomycota
- C. polygoni Henn. & Shirai (1900) = Ramularia pleuropteri
- C. pontederiae (Ellis & Dearn.) Davis (1926) = Cercospora pontederiae
- C. potentillae Woron. (1927) = Pseudocercosporella potentillae
- C. pseudoidium Speg. (1886) = Mycovellosiella pseudoidium
- C. pycnanthemi G.F. Atk. (1897) = Pseudocercosporella pycnanthemi
- C. pyri (Farl.) Karak. (1937) = Mycovellosiella pyri
- C. pyrina Ellis & Everh. (1891) = Mycovellosiella pyrina
- C. rajakii Kamal & S.K. Majumdar (2005) = Passalora rajakii
- C. rapistri Hollós (1908) = Neopseudocercosporella capsellae
- C. rosea G. Winter (1887) = Mycovellosiella rosea
- C. rottboelliae Govindu & Thirum. (1957) = Ramulispora rottboelliae
- C. saxifragae Rostr. (1891) = Pseudocercosporella saxifragae
- C. scirpi Moesz (1930) = Pseudocercosporella scirpi
- C. scorzonerae Höhn. (1905) = Cercospora scorzonerae
- C. septorioides Sacc. (1884) = Pseudocercosporella septorioides
- C. vsidae Henn. (1908) = Pseudocercospora sidae
- C. solenanthi Vasyag. (1973) = Pseudocercosporella solenanthi
- C. sterculiae O.A. Drumm. (1945) = Pseudocercosporella sterculiae
- C. stomatophila Speg. (1888) = Cercospora stomatophila
- C. sublineolata (Thüm.) Höhn. (1924) = Heterosphaeria sublineolata, Heterosphaeriaceae
- C. subulata R. Sprague (1937) = Spermospora subulata, Ascomycota
- C. theae Petch (1917) = Calonectria indusiata); Nectriaceae
- C. theae var. crotalariae Loos ex Crous, M.J. Wingf. & Alfenas (1993) = Calonectria ilicicola, Nectriaceae
- C. torrendii Bres. (1920) = Ramularia torrendii
- C. triboutiana Sacc. & Letendre (1883) = Ramularia triboutiana
- C. trichophila Davis (1915) = Pseudocercosporella trichophila
- C. tubercularioides Speg. (1910) = Phloeosporina tubercularioides. Ascomycota
- C. unguis-cati Speg. (1910) = Pseudocercospora unguis-cati
- C. uredinophila Sacc. (1914) = Cercospora uredinophila
- C. valerianae Karak. (1919) = Passalora valerianae
- C. valerianae Siemaszko (1923) = Passalora valerianae
- C. veratri Peck (1891) = Mycocentrospora veratri, Pleosporales
- C. veratrina (Sacc. & G. Winter) Höhn. (1924) = Cylindrosporium veratrinum, Ploettnerulaceae
- C. woronowii Siemaszko (1919) = Pseudocercosporella woronowii
