= WLV =

WLV may refer to:

- Wineberry latent virus, a plant pathogenic virus of the family Alphaflexiviridae
- WLV, the National Rail code for Wallasey Village railway station, Wirral, England
