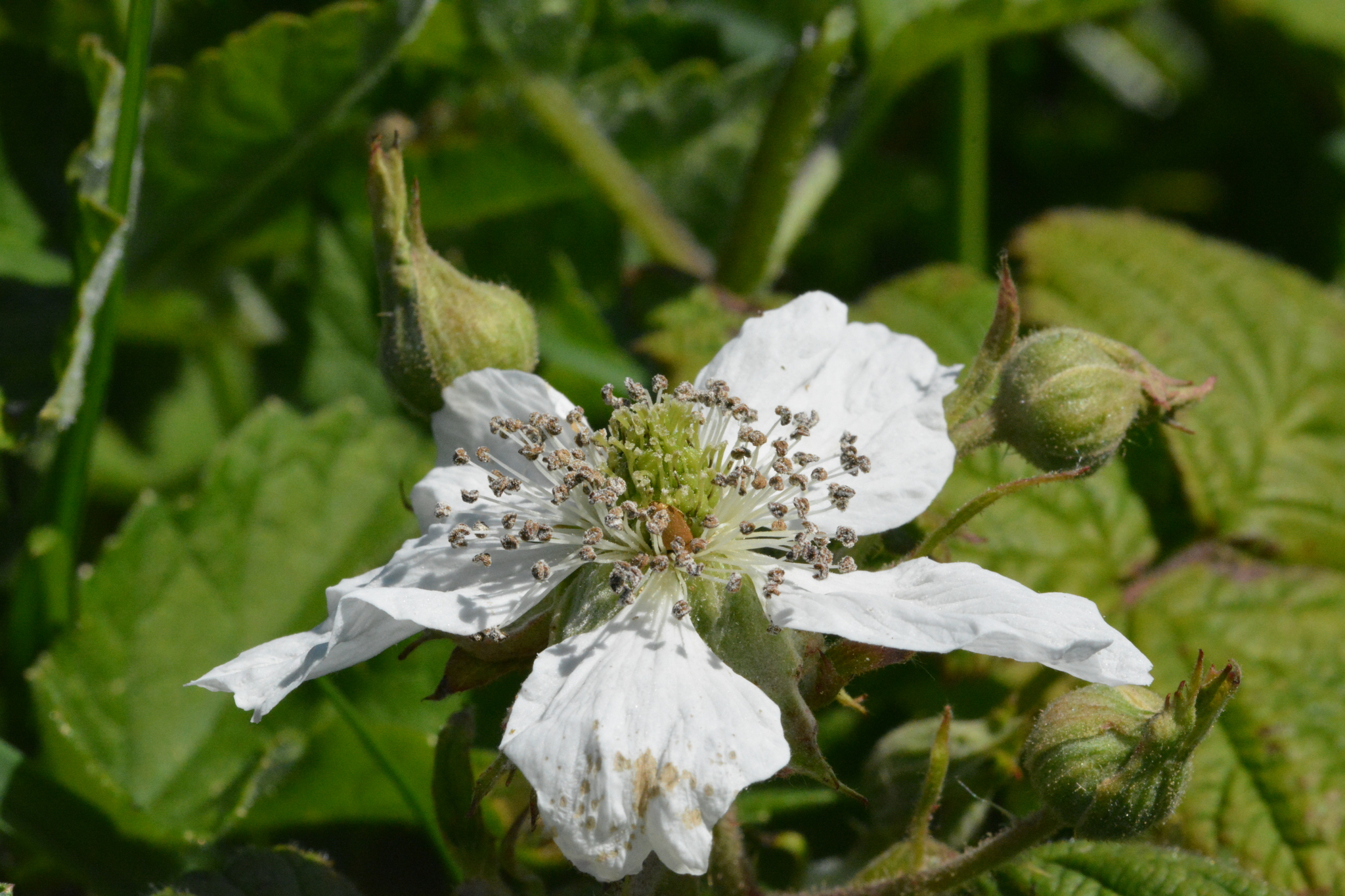
- Rubus flower infected with Hapalosphaeria deformans. White spores are visible on the anthers.

Scientific classification
- Kingdom: Fungi
- Division: Ascomycota
- Class: incertae sedis
- Order: incertae sedis
- Family: incertae sedis
- Genus: Hapalosphaeria; Syd.
- Species: H. deformans

Binomial name
- Hapalosphaeria deformans (Syd.) Syd. (1908)

Synonyms
- Paepalopsis deformans Syd. (1907)

= Hapalosphaeria =

Species of fungus

Hapalosphaeria deformans is an ascomycete fungus. It is the causal organism of stamen blight of blackberries and raspberries.

== Symptoms ==
Hapalosphaeria affects the growth and development of the vegetative and reproductive structures of its host. A minority of infected flowers have enlarged petals, with a crumpled appearance relative to uninfected ones. These flowers also show partial flower doubling, with extra petal tissue growing from the base of the petals. White tendrils of spores are visible on the surface of the anthers, which never dehisce.

== Hosts ==
The hosts are Rubus species. Among Rubus species, known domesticated hosts are blackberry, boysenberry, cascadeberry, evergreen blackberry, loganberry, raspberry, and youngberry, and nine wild Rubus including wild raspberries R. idaeus.

== Distribution ==
Hapalosphaeria is a common disease in the Pacific Northwest of North America (especially west of the Cascades, especially in Oregon), elsewhere in Canada, Denmark, Germany, Great Britain, Ireland, and Spain. It affects the commercial harvest of Oregon dewberries, and boysenberries and cascadeberries in British Columbia. It is not commercially significant in raspberry in Scotland.

== See also ==
- List of Rubus diseases
