= George Herbert Pethybridge =

British botanist and mycologist (1871–1948)

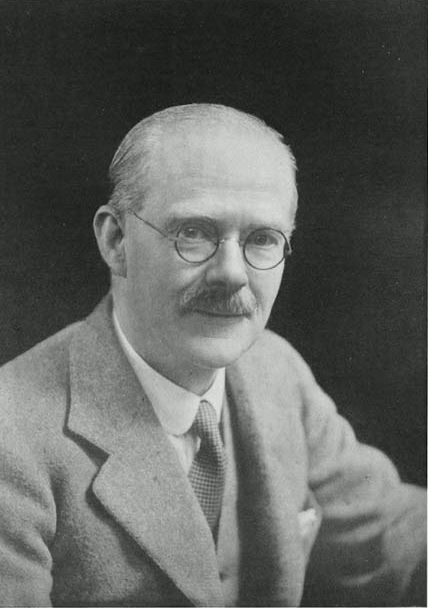

George Herbert Pethybridge FLS MRIA OBE (1 October 1871, Bodmin, Cornwall, UK – 23 May 1948, Bodmin) was a British mycologist and phytopathologist, who gained an international reputation for his research on diseases of the potato species Solanum tuberosum. He is noteworthy for his 1913 discovery of the water mold species Phytophthora erythroseptica.

== Biography ==
After secondary education at Dunheved College in Launceston, Cornwall, he matriculated at the University of London, where he graduated with a B.Sc. in 1892. From 1892 to 1897 he taught as a science master at Kingswood School in Bath and at other schools. In 1897 he went to the University of Göttingen, where he studied under the botanist and plant physiologist Gottfried Berthold (1854–1937). Pethybridge received his doctorate in 1899 with a dissertation entitled Beiträge zur Kenntnis der Einwirkung der anorganischen Salze auf die Entwicklung und den Bau der Pflanzen (Contributions to knowledge about the influence of inorganic salts on the development and structure of plants).

When Pethybridge returned from Germany, he became a staff member in the botany department of the Royal College of Science for Ireland (RCScI) under the aegis of the British Science and Art Department, which was a subdivision of the Board of Trade. (In 1900 the Board of Agriculture took over the Science and Art Department.) In the RCScI's department of botany, he worked from 1900 to 1909 as an assistant to Thomas Johnson, a professor at the Catholic University of Ireland. In 1909 Pethybridge was appointed the first head of the Seeds and Plant Diseases Division of the Board of Agriculture and Fisheries. From 1908 to 1923 Pethybridge held the position of Economic Botanist to the Department of Agriculture and Technical Instruction for Ireland. From 1900 to 1923 Pethybridge and his colleagues in Dublin did important research on diseases of potato, flax, and other crop plants. Most of his scientific papers from 1900 to 1923 on phytopathology were published in The Scientific Proceedings of the Royal Dublin Society.

Two of his important papers are The Vegetation of the District Lying South of Dublin (published in 1904 in collaboration with Robert Lloyd Praeger)) and A Census Catalogue of Irish Fungi (published in 1910 in collaboration with John Adams, a professor of botany at the UCD School of Veterinary Medicine). Shortly after the Irish Free State was established in December 1922, Pethybridge resigned his post. Early in 1923 he was appointed mycologist to the UK Ministry of Agriculture and Fisheries and assistant director of that ministry's Plant Pathology Laboratory at Harpenden. He retired from the Plant Pathology Laboratory in 1936.

At Harpenden, Pethybridge was head of the Seed Testing Station from 1923 onwards. In the later years of his career, he spent more time on administrative duties and less time on research. From 1936 to 1948 he was an editor on the publication committee of The Journal of Pomology and Horticultural Science.

In 1921 he was awarded the Boyle Medal of the Royal Dublin Society. He was elected in 1925 a Fellow of the Linnean Society of London. In 1926 he was elected to a one-year term as president of the British Mycological Society. Soon after his retirement in 1936, he was appointed Officer of the British Empire. For the last seven years of his life, he lived in Bodmin.

George Herbert Pethybridge's father was John Stranger Pethybridge (1826–1887), who was the father of 8 sons and 3 daughters. One of the daughters died in infancy. When George H. Pethybridge died in May 1948, his will was probated on 18 August 1948. His estate was bequeathed to two of his nephews with first beneficiary John Henry Pethybridge (1907–2001) and second beneficiary Walter Heather Pethybridge (1905–1994).

== Selected publications ==
- Pethybridge, George H.; Praeger, Robert Lloyd (1904). "The Vegetation of the District Lying South of Dublin". Proceedings of the Royal Irish Academy. Section B: Biological, Geological, and Chemical Science. 25: 124–180. JSTOR 20490936.
- Adams, John; Pethybridge, George H. (1909). "A Census Catalogue of Irish Fungi". Proceedings of the Royal Irish Academy. Section B: Biological, Geological, and Chemical Science. 28: 120–166. JSTOR 20490942.
- Pethybridge, G. H. (January 1910). "Potato Diseases in Ireland". Journal of the Department of Agriculture and Technical Instruction for Ireland. X (2): 431–447.
- "XIV. Is it possible to distinguish the Seeds of Wild White Clover from those of Ordinary White Clover by Chemical Means during a Germination Test? by George Herbert Pethybridge". The Economic Proceedings of the Royal Dublin Society. Vol. II. 1910. pp. 248–258.
- Pethybridge, George H.; Murphy, Paul A. (1911). "A Bacterial Disease of the Potato Plant in Ireland and the Organism Causing It". Proceedings of the Royal Irish Academy. Section B: Biological, Geological, and Chemical Science. 29: 1–37. JSTOR 20516962.
- Pethybridge, G. H. (1913). "On the rotting of potato tubers by a new species of Phytophthora hitherto undescribed". Sci. Proc. Roy. Dub. Soc. 13: 529–565.
- "II. Considerations and Experiments on the supposed Infection of the Potato Crop with the Blight Fungus (Phytophthora infestans) by means of Mycelium derived directly from the planted Tubers, by George Herbert Pethybridge". The Scientific Proceedings of the Royal Dublin Society. Vol. XIII. 1913. pp. 12–27.
- Pethybridge, G. H.; Lafferty, H. A. (1919). "A disease of tomato and other plants caused by a new species of Phytophthora". Science Proceedings of the Royal Dublin Society. 15: 487–503.
- Pethybridge, G.H. (1927). "Nectria rubi". Transactions of the British Mycological Society. 12: 20–23. doi:10.1016/S0007-1536(27)80031-8. (See Nectria mammoidea var. rubi.)
