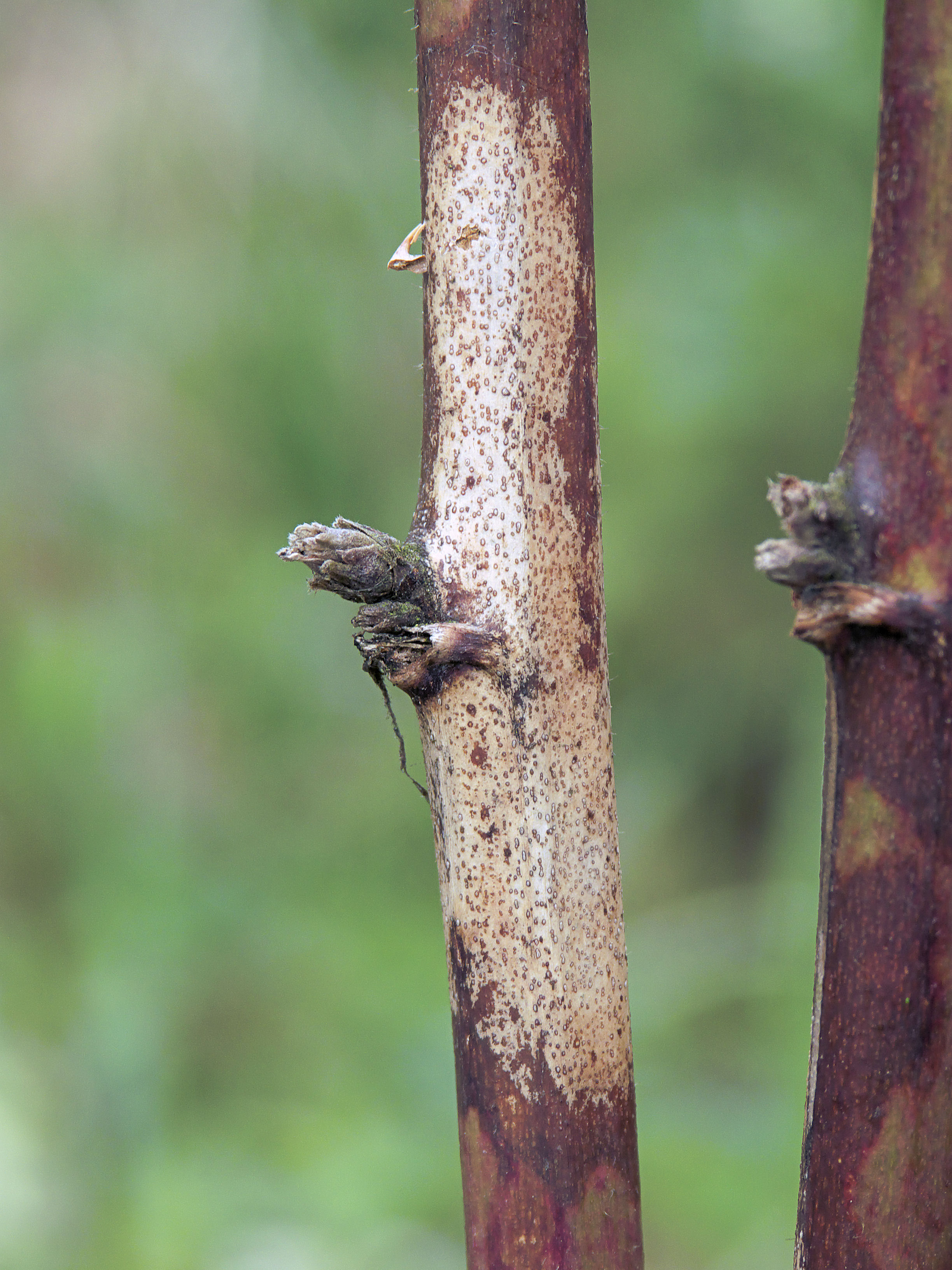
- Septocyta ruborum at blackberry

Scientific classification
- Kingdom: Fungi
- Division: Ascomycota
- Class: Ascomycetes
- Order: incertae sedis
- Family: incertae sedis
- Genus: Septocyta
- Species: S. ruborum

Binomial name
- Septocyta ruborum (Lib.) Petr. (1968)

Synonyms
- Ascochyta ruborum Lib. (1834); Cytospora ramealis (Roberge ex Desm.) Petr. (1920); Cytosporina ramealis (Roberge ex Desm.) Petr. Rhabdospora ramealis (Roberge ex Desm.) Sacc. (1884); Rhabdospora rubi Ellis; Rhabdospora ruborum (Lib.) Jørst. (1965); Septocyta ramealis (Roberge ex Desm.) Petr. (1927); Septoria ramealis Roberge ex Desm. Septoria ramealis Pass. (1879); Septoria ruborum (Lib.) Westend.

= Septocyta ruborum =

Species of fungus

Septocyta ruborum is a species of fungus in the Ascomycota. Its taxonomic relationship to other taxa in the Ascomycota is unknown, and it has not been assigned with certainty to any order or family (incertae sedis). It is a plant pathogen and grows on Rubus laciniatus, R. nessensis, R. procerus and wild blackberry (R. fruticosus); it causes purple blotch or stem spot disease, also known as dieback of blackberries.
