= Xiphinema rivesi =

Scientific classification
- Domain: Eukaryota
- Kingdom: Animalia
- Phylum: Nematoda
- Class: Enoplea
- Order: Dorylaimida
- Family: Longidoridae
- Genus: Xiphinema
- Species: X. rivesi

Binomial name
- Xiphinema rivesi Dalmasso, 1969

Species of roundworm

Xiphinema rivesi is a plant pathogenic nematode infecting caneberries and fruit trees.

== See also ==
- List of apple diseases
- List of apricot diseases
- List of caneberries diseases
- List of peach and nectarine diseases
