= Sydowiella =

Scientific classification
- Kingdom: Fungi
- Division: Ascomycota
- Class: Sordariomycetes
- Order: Diaporthales
- Family: Sydowiellaceae
- Genus: Sydowiella; Petr.

Type species
- Sydowiella fenestrans (Duby) Petr.

Species
- See text

Genus of fungi

Sydowiella is a genus of fungi within the family Sydowiellaceae.

The genus was circumscribed by Franz Petrak in Ann. Mycol. vol.21 on page 30 in 1923.

The genus name of Sydowiella is in honour of Hans Sydow (1879–1946), who was a German mycologist.

== Species ==
As accepted by Species Fungorum;

- Sydowiella azukiae I. Hino & Katum. (1966)
- Sydowiella centaureae Senan., Camporesi & K.D. Hyde (2017)
- Sydowiella dakotensis Petr. (1925)
- Sydowiella depressula (P. Karst.) M.E. Barr (1978)
- Sydowiella fenestrans (Duby) Petr. (1923)
- Sydowiella indica Bilgrami & Rizwi (1978)
- Sydowiella juncina Spooner (1984)
- Sydowiella stellatifolii Marinc., M.J. Wingf. & Crous (2008)
- Sydowiella urticicola Senan., Camporesi & K.D. Hyde (2017)

Former species;

- S. borealis (M.E. Barr) Lar.N. Vassiljeva (1998) = Cainiella borealis, Sordariaceae
- S. dryadis Lar.N. Vassiljeva (1979), (= Lentomita dryadis), Chaetosphaeriaceae
- S. dryadis var. macrospora Nograsek (1991) = Lentomita dryadis, Chaetosphaeriaceae
