= Sphaerulina musiva =

Scientific classification
- Kingdom: Fungi
- Division: Ascomycota
- Class: Dothideomycetes
- Order: Mycosphaerellales
- Family: Mycosphaerellaceae
- Genus: Sphaerulina
- Species: S. musiva

Binomial name
- Sphaerulina musiva (Peck) Quaedvl., Verkley & Crous

Synonyms
- Cylindrosporium oculatum Ellis & Everh.; Davidiella populorum (G.E. Thomps.) Aptroot; Mycosphaerella populorum G.E. Thomps.; Rhabdospora musiva (Peck) Kuntze; Septoria musiva Peck

Species of fungus

Sphaerulina musiva (syn.; Septoria musiva: teleomorph; Mycosphaerella populorum), is an ascomycete fungus responsible for a leaf spot and canker disease on poplar trees. It is native on the eastern cottonwood poplar Populus deltoides, causing only a leaf spot symptom. On susceptible hybrid poplars, S. musiva causes necrotic lesions on the leaves which lead to premature defoliation, and cankers on the stem and branches which can reduce growth, predispose the tree to colonisation by secondary organisms, and cause stem breakage.

In 2013, Quaedvlieg et al. introduced a new combination for this species: Sphaerulina musiva (Peck) Quaedvlieg, Verkley & Crous, as they found that the type strains of both the genus Mycosphaerella (linked to the anamorph genus Ramularia via Ramularia endophylla) and the genus Septoria (linked to the anamorph genus Septoria, via Septoria cytisi) clustered separately from the clade containing Sphaerulina musiva.

== Distribution and hosts ==
Sphaerulina musiva is distributed in northeastern North America sympatrically with the native eastern cottonwood P. deltoides, on which the disease is limited to a leaf spot symptom. These endemic leaf spots on P. deltoides are believed to constitute a source of inoculum for hybrid poplar plantations. S. musiva has sometimes been reported on Tacamahaca poplars indigenous to North America (P. trichocarpa and P. balsamifera) and on their hybrids. For example, in 2006, a high incidence of stem infections caused by this fungus was observed on P. balsamifera in a plantation within its native range in northern Alberta. S. musiva leaf spots have also been observed on willow trees, as Salix lucida spp. lucida. Until 2006, plantings of potentially susceptible clones in the Pacific Northwest region of North America remained free of Septoria canker disease but since this date, cankers caused by this disease have been observed on a regular basis in two hybrid poplar nurseries located in the Fraser Valley of British Columbia.

=== Life cycle ===
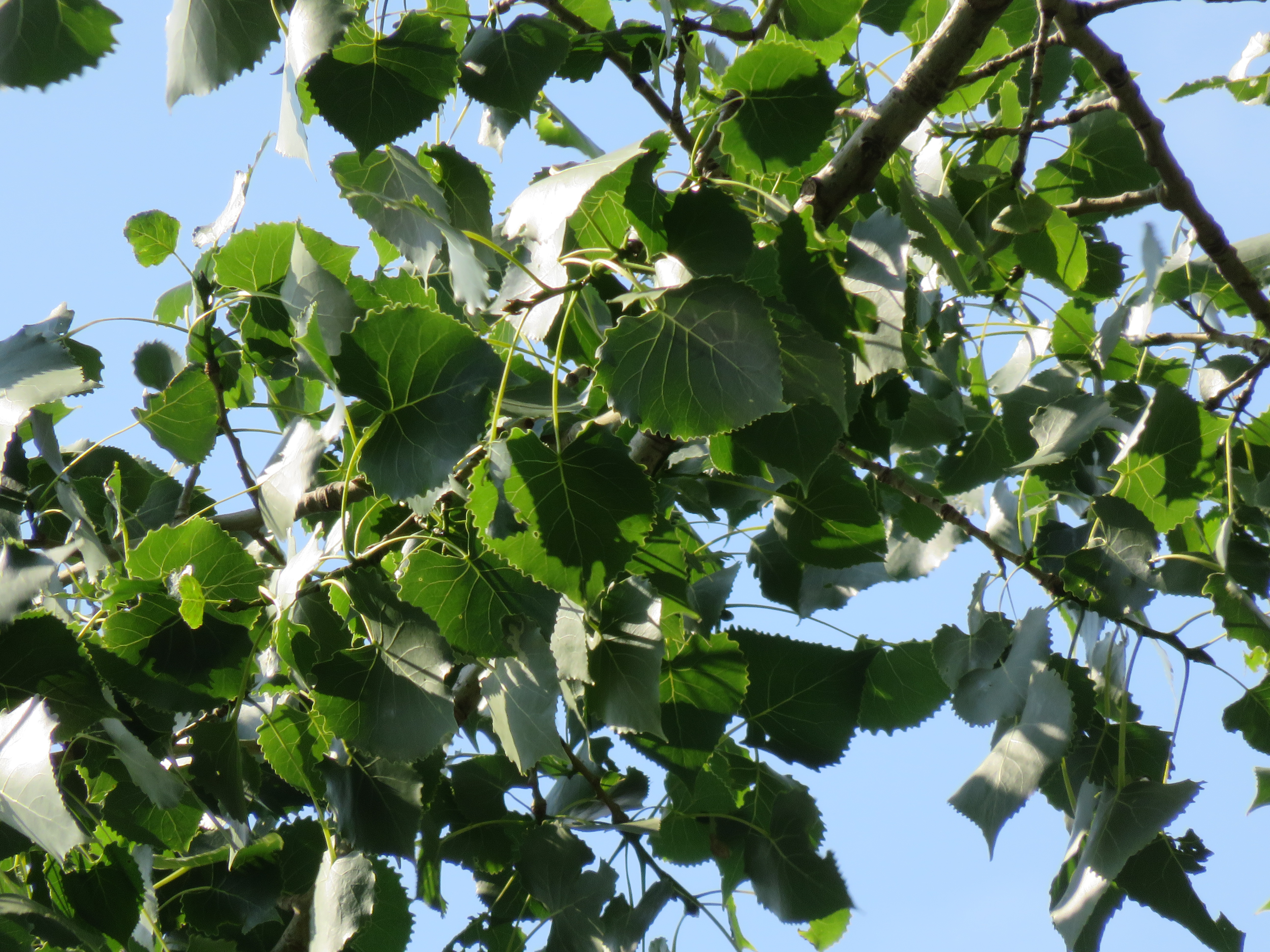
Foliage of Populus deltoides, the native host of the fungus

Sphaerulina musiva can be transmitted in two ways. The most common is through wind borne spores from infected leaves to new host leaves. The second way is through the transplanting of a cutting of an infected poplar tree. This is when new shoots are taken off an existing tree and planted somewhere else.

The leaf is the first thing infected by the windborne spores, often it is the youngest shoots, it is nearly always those on the lowest branches. It attacks from the bottom up of a poplar tree, because the main source of the infection (the dead leaves) are lying on the ground. The higher branch shoots have a longer window of resistance simply because they are so far away from the disease. The leaves begin to develop Pycnidium which are the fruiting bodies that spread the disease to other hosts. The infection begins to spread up the host to the top branches, creating leaf spots and cankers where ever it can. After the disease has used all the resources of the leaves, they have become black and shriveled. The leaves fall like normal in the fall, and overwinter on dead leaves on the ground. In the spring the wind picks up the Pycnidium S. musiva spores and it carries them to find a new host to start the infection all over again. It is worth noting that the cankers can spread the disease if they happen to break, they will release spores of their own, however, this is not the main source of infection as S. musiva cankers can live in the branch of the tree far longer than the S. musiva on leaves.

=== Effects on fitness ===
Sphaerulina musiva affects fitness in two ways, depending on how it manifests itself, either as a leaf spot or a canker. If it can only infect the leaf, it will only affect that leaf and not the entire tree's fitness. This is not saying that S. musiva doesn't spread to other leaves, which it does, only that it will not kill the tree itself, just the leaves. The leaves become covered in spots first, then become black and shrivel up. The dead leaves fall off the tree and that is where S. musiva will stay throughout the winter. This causes defoliation of the trees, but not tree death.

If the S. musiva infects as a canker on a poplar tree, it will likely result in branch death. The presence of the canker weakens the branch itself and often causes it to snap at the site of the canker, releasing the spores. The presence of a canker restricts access to nutrients and water and could result in tree death.

== Epidemiology ==
Sphaerulina musiva is rapidly becoming more and more common in hybrid poplar plantations. Since the disease is wind borne, it is easily transmitted and will spread rapidly if not contained. Reports of S. musiva have mainly come from central and eastern US and eastern Canada, the assumed endemic range of the pathogen on Populus deltoides. Population genetics approaches suggested that dissemination of the pathogen appears to be associated with the natural distribution of wild P. deltoïdes. More recently, anthropogenic activities like plant exchanges and transportation of infected plant material also resulted in spread and introduction of the disease in naïve habitats. There is a major concern to make sure it does not reach Europe, as it will likely take over the native poplars very quickly there.

=== Diagnosis ===
Cankers appear on branches and new shoots off poplar trees, these are relatively weak spots on the tree and often break. This is how the secondary infections enter, often disguising the S. musiva origins. Cankers are often colored around the edges and sunken in the branch itself. The tissue will become very dry and brittle, turn dark brown/black and sometimes form a lesion on the leaf.

Leaf spots often appear on fallen leaves, relatively circular, with black margins, it appears to look like there is mold growing on the leaf. The leaves will eventually shrivel and blacken, then fall to the ground where the spores will over winter.

=== Prevention ===
There is no way yet to prevent S. musiva from spreading in the already planted areas. Once the S. musiva has infiltrated an area it is very difficult to get rid of the fungus. Some suggest that pouring a sulfur solution around the infected area will help, but this has not been scientifically supported. The main focus is if there is an infection it must be recognized quickly. The only true way to prevent the spread of S. musiva is to plant all resistant hybrid poplars. This is helpful for the future, however it does not solve the current problem of dealing with the infection of the already planted poplar trees. It would be highly unlikely, probably impossible, to remove all non-resistant hybrid poplars from the population. The research is now focused on finding a spray or chemical that can be applied to destroy the S. musiva.

=== Treatment ===
The only recommended treatment for S. musiva as recommended by the Department of Agriculture, is to prune away infected branches and clear infected leaves so that the musiva spores do not spread. Although there is research done by Ostry, Wilson, and McNabb saying that this treatment is not very effective, it is still the only widely accepted course of action against S. musiva. They planted the developed resistant clones in a mosaic pattern to some effect, allowing for the removal of the infected trees, helping the resistant trees to flourish. There is no proven chemical to help get rid of the fungus. Hybrid resistant clones have been bred to be resistant to the fungus, but there is some evidence that S. musiva is developing a resistance, so this may not be a long-term solution either.

== History ==
Sphaerulina musiva was first documented in 1923 in the Northern part of the United States by Johnson and Cobb, both of whom were with the US Department of Agriculture. In 1928, it was discovered to have originated in Canada in Indian Head, Saskatchewan. Later, it was confirmed that the fungus found here and in Canada were both S. musiva. They were discovered within five years of each other, it is unknown whether it arose independently or was brought to either place on existing poplars. It was noted for its defoliation ability and the reduced yield garnished from infected poplars. The importation of the Canadian Poplar furthered the spread of the disease in the United States. Some Canadian poplars were found to be more resistant to the disease than others, resulting in an increase in the plantings of the resistant hybrid clones. In 1941, it was discovered to have spread to Argentina from a shipment of infected poplars from the United States.
