= Xiphinema bakeri =

Scientific classification
- Domain: Eukaryota
- Kingdom: Animalia
- Phylum: Nematoda
- Class: Enoplea
- Order: Dorylaimida
- Family: Longidoridae
- Genus: Xiphinema
- Species: X. bakeri

Binomial name
- Xiphinema bakeri Williams, 1961

Species of roundworm

Xiphinema bakeri is a plant pathogenic nematode infecting caneberries.

== See also ==
- List of caneberries diseases
