= Sphaerulina oryzina =

Scientific classification
- Domain: Eukaryota
- Kingdom: Fungi
- Division: Ascomycota
- Class: Dothideomycetes
- Order: Capnodiales
- Family: Mycosphaerellaceae
- Genus: Sphaerulina
- Species: S. oryzina

Binomial name
- Sphaerulina oryzina Hara, (1918)

Synonyms
- Cercospora janseana (Racib.) Constant., Cryptog. Mycol. 3(1): 63 (1982); Cercospora oryzae T. Miyake, Journal agric. Tokyo 2: 263 (1910); Napicladium janseanum Racib., (1900); Passalora janseana (Racib.) U. Braun, (2000)

Species of fungus

Sphaerulina oryzina is a fungal plant pathogen infecting rice. Propiconazole is an effective fungicide recommended for use in rice culture.
