= Sphaerulina =

Scientific classification
- Kingdom: Fungi
- Division: Ascomycota
- Class: Dothideomycetes
- Order: Mycosphaerellales
- Family: Mycosphaerellaceae
- Genus: Sphaerulina; Sacc.

Species
- Sphaerulina musiva Sphaerulina oryzina Sphaerulina rehmiana Sphaerulina rubi Sphaerulina westendorpii

Genus of fungi

Sphaerulina is a genus of fungi in the family Mycosphaerellaceae. Sphaerulina causes leaf spot diseases on various plants, including both arboreous and herbaceous plants.
