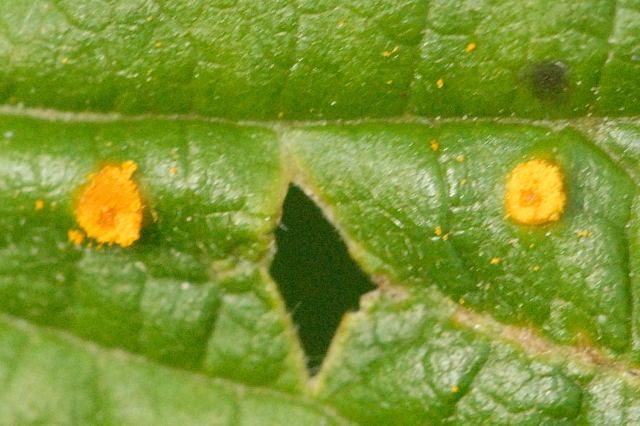

Scientific classification
- Kingdom: Fungi
- Division: Basidiomycota
- Class: Pucciniomycetes
- Order: Pucciniales
- Family: Phragmidiaceae
- Genus: Phragmidium
- Species: P. rubi-idaei

Binomial name
- Phragmidium rubi-idaei (DC.) P. Karst., (1879)

Synonyms
- Aregma gracile Sm.{?}, (1836); Lecythea gyrosa Lév., (1865); Phragmidium gracilis (Grev.) Cooke, (1871); Phragmidium imitans Arthur, (1912); Puccinia gracilis Grev., (1824); Puccinia rubi Schumach., (1803); Puccinia rubi-idaei DC., (1815); Puccinia ruborum sensu auct. brit. p.p.; (2005); Uredo gyrosa Rebent., (1804); Uredo rubi-idaei Pers., (1800); Uredo ruborum sensu auct. brit. p.p.

= Phragmidium rubi-idaei =

Species of fungus

Phragmidium rubi-idaei is a plant pathogen infecting caneberries, Rubus spp.
