= Bramble yellow mosaic virus =

Virus classification
- Group: Group IV ((+)ssRNA)
- Family: Potyviridae
- Genus: Potyvirus
- Species: Bramble yellow mosaic virus

Species of virus

Bramble yellow mosaic virus (BrmYMV) is a plant pathogenic virus of the family Potyviridae.
