= Cercosporella rubi =

Scientific classification
- Kingdom: Fungi
- Division: Ascomycota
- Class: Dothideomycetes
- Order: Capnodiales
- Family: Mycosphaerellaceae
- Genus: Cercosporella
- Species: C. rubi

Binomial name
- Cercosporella rubi (G. Winter) Plakidas, (1937)

Synonyms
- Fusisporium rubi G. Winter, (1885); Ramularia rubi (G. Winter) Wollenw., (1916)

Species of fungus/Plant Disease

Cercosporella rubi is a plant pathogenic fungus which causes blackberry rosette, a disease that is also known as double blossom or witches' broom of blackberry. In infected plants, the symptoms that C. rubi causes are double blossoms as well as witches' brooms. Diseased canes do not produce fruit, and as a result, this pathogen poses one of the largest threats to commercial blackberry production. The disease is most prevalent in the southeast United States.

== Hosts and range ==
The hosts of C. rubi are limited to the genus Rubus, which encompasses blackberries (both erect and trailing varieties), raspberries, dewberries, and boysenberries. Blackberries are the most common host of this disease, though it's possible for boysenberries to serve as hosts as well. Blackberry cultivars with thorns are much more susceptible to rosette than thornless varieties.

In the United States, rosette disease of blackberry is commonly found in the southeast parts of the country encompassed by New Jersey, Illinois, and Texas. The disease spreads to new areas through infected nursery stock or the dispersion of wind borne spores.

== Life cycle ==
The life cycle of C. rubi follows the biennial life cycle of blackberry canes. The first-year non-flowering canes, known as primocanes, are infected by conidia that are dispersed by C. rubi fruiting bodies. These fungal bodies lie within the infected flowers of second-year canes, which are known as floricanes. C. rubi overwinters within axillary buds of the primocanes until the springtime when they become floricanes and flower. At this stage, conidia are released, they infect new primocanes, and the cycle begins anew.

== Control ==
=== Preventative control ===
The most reliable way to control C. rubi and prevent the spread of rosette disease is to use disease-free planting stock and plant resistant cultivars. Root stocks or cutting from roots can be used, as the disease is not systemic. The spread of C. rubi can also be mitigated by removing wild blackberries or dewberries from an area prior to planting crop blackberries. This is because these wild plants can also serve as hosts for C. rubi, and if left alone will grow vigorously and spread the disease to cultivated blackberry plants in the area.

=== Sanitation and pruning ===
==== Low to moderate infections ====
Plants with low to moderate levels of C. rubi infection should be pruned to remove infected biomass. Diseased canes can be identified by the presence of witches' brooms or elongated flower buds that are a deeper pink color than healthy flowers. Ideally, the biomass should be removed before the blossoms open to prevent further spread of the fungus. Once removed, the infected biomass should be destroyed with a controlled burn to prevent the spread of the fungus post-pruning.

==== Severe infections ====
In the case of severely infected plants, one can cut both the primocanes and floricanes down to the ground immediately after harvest. This removes infected tissue and fungal bodies. This practice works best for blackberry varieties that grow vigorously as opposed to those that are slower growing, as it heavily reduces fruit production.

=== Fungicides ===
Fungicides in the strobilurin group, such as pyraclostrobin or azoxystrobin, as well as those in the anilinopyrimidine group can control C. rubi. For fungicides to work properly, they must be applied when infected flowers are open. Therefore, they should be applied from the time when buds start to swell up until all flowers are spent.
