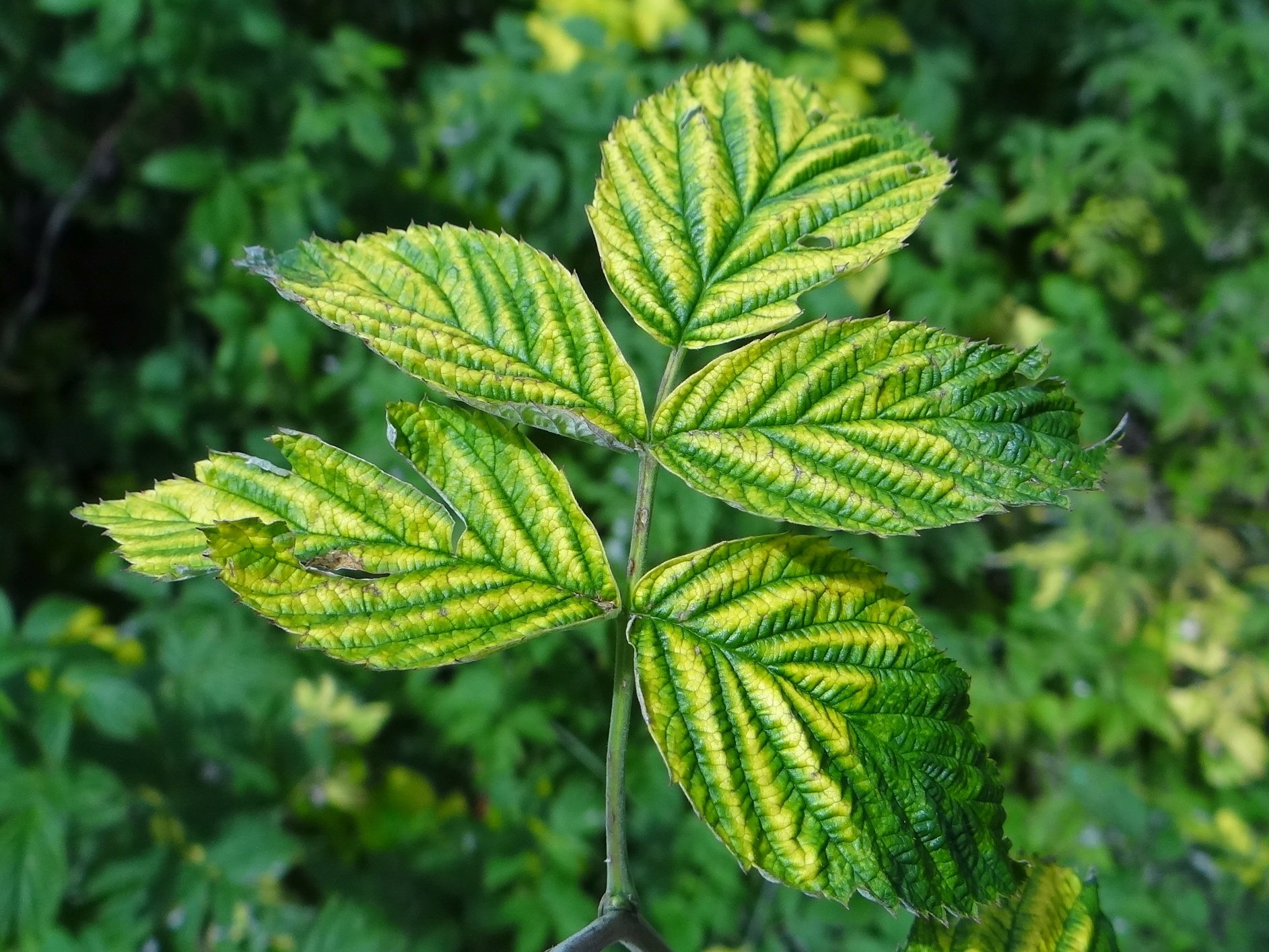

Virus classification
- (unranked): Virus
- Realm: Riboviria
- Kingdom: Orthornavirae
- Phylum: Negarnaviricota
- Class: Monjiviricetes
- Order: Mononegavirales
- Family: Rhabdoviridae
- Genus: Cytorhabdovirus
- Virus: Raspberry vein chlorosis virus

Synonyms
- Raspberry chlorotic virus

= Raspberry vein chlorosis virus =

Species of virus

Raspberry vein chlorosis virus (RVCV) is a plant pathogenic virus of the family Rhabdoviridae.
