= Raspberry leaf spot =

Plant fungal disease

- Causal agents: Sphaerulina rubi
- Hosts: Raspberry
- EPPO Code: SPHNRU

Raspberry leaf spot

Scientific classification
- Kingdom: Fungi
- Division: Ascomycota
- Class: Dothideomycetes
- Order: Mycosphaerellales
- Family: Mycosphaerellaceae
- Genus: Sphaerulina
- Species: S. rubi

Binomial name
- Sphaerulina rubi (Demaree & Wilcox, 1943)

Synonyms
- Cylindrosporium rubi

Raspberry leaf spot is a plant disease caused by Sphaerulina rubi (syn. Cylindrosporium rubi), an ascomycete fungus. Early symptoms of infection are dark green spots on young leaves. As the disease progresses, these spots turn tan or gray in color. Disease management strategies for raspberry leaf spots include the use of genetically resistant raspberry plant varieties, chemical fungicide sprays, and cultural practices such as pruning and thinning out canes.

Raspberries are an important fruit, mainly grown in Washington, Oregon and California. Although they are also grown in the Midwest and northeastern states, the output is not nearly as great due to the colder weathers and shorter growing seasons. S. rubi prefers warmer and wetter conditions, which can make raspberry production very difficult in California.

== Hosts and symptoms ==
A raspberry leaf spot infection initially causes dark green circular spots on the upper side of young leaves, which will eventually turn tan or gray. These spots are typically 1–2 millimetres (0.039–0.079 in) in diameter, but can get as big as 4–6 millimetres (0.16–0.24 in). These spots can also fall out, causing a shot effect. More severe infections can cause leaves to drop prematurely in the late summer and early fall. This premature defoliation can result in reduction of plant vigor, and make the plants more susceptible to winter injury. Due to the loss of leaves, infected raspberries are more susceptible to winter injury. As a result, raspberry leaf spot may not only reduce yield in season, but cause lasting consequence into the next season.

Raspberry leaf spot is also typically more severe in primocanes (first year canes) than floricanes (second year canes).

The symptoms of raspberry leaf spot are similar to the symptoms of Raspberry Anthracnose. The best way to differentiate between the two fungal diseases is to inspect the stems of the plant. Stem lesions are indicative of raspberry anthracnose.

In 1943, it was discovered that S. rubi only infects raspberry plants. Previously, the pathogen had also been blamed for leaf spot on blackberry and dewberry. However, Demaree and Wilcox demonstrated the raspberry pathogen could not cause leaf spots on blackberry or dewberry. The similar pathogens were also differentiated as perfect and imperfect, as the blackberry leaf spot pathogen didn't have a known sexual stage. Additionally, the conidia of Sphaerulina rubi are 3-4.8 x 32-86μm and have 3-9 septa, while the conidia of Sphaerulina westendorpii are 1.5 x 40-55μm and have two to three septa.

== Disease cycle ==
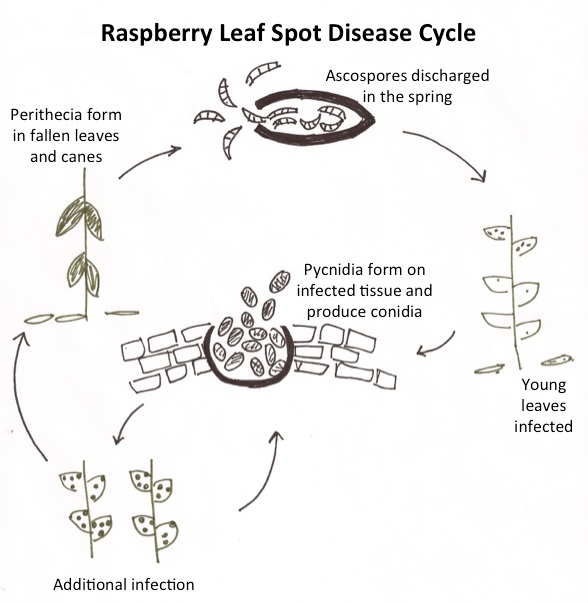
Raspberry leaf spot disease cycle

In spring, when conditions are favorable, infect of young leaves of raspberry plants is initiated from ascospores discharged from perithecia or conidia discharged from pycnidia that have overwintered in fallen leaves or canes. Once infected, the raspberry leaf serves as a nutrient source for the fungus to begin producing secondary inoculum, or conidia, within pycnidia, a survival structure that protects the spores. Conidia can undergo several repeating secondary cycles and re-infect other nearby plants. When the leaves of the raspberry plant begin to fall, perithecia form in the fallen tissue where asci and ascospores will be produced and protected until the following spring. The perithecia are black, found subepidermaly. The ascospores are characterized by a cylindrical, curved shape and are pointed at both ends with four septate usually.

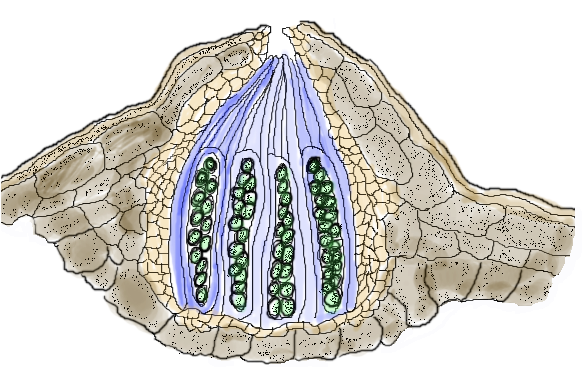
Diagram of a perithecium. Each ascus contains eight ascospores, shown in green.

== Environment ==
Sphaerulina rubi grows optimally in humid conditions, which promotes wet leaves. In general, the conidia of S. rubi are disseminated through wind and rain. With these favorable conditions, the fungus can cause secondary infections more easily, thus leading to a more serious outbreak.

Furthermore, because the fungus produces pycnidia, a survival structure that contains conidia, it can survive in a range of temperatures, although the fungus grows optimally at 27 °C (81 °F). Provided that there is adequate moisture, the conidia from the pycnidia will be able to disseminate via wind and rain.

Raspberry leaf spot infections will typically be more severe in parts of the United States that are climatically warmer and more humid.

== Management ==
Genetic resistance is the preferred disease management strategy because it allows farmers to minimize chemical intervention. Less pesticide and fungicide can encourage biological control agents, reduce production costs, and minimize the chemical residues in fruit. Some genetic varieties of raspberry are better than others for the control of leaf spot. Nova, Jewel Black and Lauren are all resistant varieties, while Prelude and Honey Queen Golden Raspberry have some resistance, but can be susceptible depending on environmental conditions. Reiville, Canby, Encore, Anne and Qualicum are the most susceptible varieties.

Cultural practices are also important for the management of raspberry leaf spot, this includes spacing out and narrowing rows to increase air flow and faster drying as well as removing any weeds and thinning out old canes. Sanitation, which includes the removal of all plant debris and infected canes in the fall, reduces places for the pathogen to overwinter. Pruning the raspberry plants and planting in rows will allow for airflow to dry leaves, creating an uninviting environment for fungi. Macrotunnels can also be utilized as a cultural control to regulate soil moisture and evapotranspiration within the growing environment. Furthermore, air flow circulation is important for reducing sporulation and successful infection. Lastly, avoid wounding the plants, as this may provide the fungus with an opportunity to infect.

== Importance ==
Raspberry is the third most popular berry in the United States. Raspberry leaf spot is found in most parts of North America, but is generally most severe toward the southern areas of the raspberry production region. In the US, per capita consumption of fresh raspberries was 0.27 pounds (0.12 kg) in 2008 with frozen raspberry consumption adding 0.36 pounds (0.16 kg). Although there is a high demand for raspberries, growers find it very difficult to grow them. Not only are they relatively fastidious when it comes to general requirements for survival, but they also tend to be susceptible to disease. Specifically, raspberry leaf spot can be a debilitating disease if conditions are favorable. If defoliation does occur due to raspberry leaf spot, the outcome can be economically devastating for the farmer. Defoliation would cause the loss of the plant's ability to photosynthesize, and thus, the fruit would be lost shortly after. Yield for raspberries can be anywhere from 0 to 6,000 pounds per acre (0 to 6,725 kg/ha), typical yields being 4,000 to 5,000 pounds per acre (4,500 to 5,600 kg/ha). With an input cost of approximately $4,000, raspberries are a risky endeavor.
