= Sydowiella depressula =

Scientific classification
- Kingdom: Fungi
- Division: Ascomycota
- Class: Sordariomycetes
- Order: Diaporthales
- Family: Sydowiellaceae
- Genus: Sydowiella
- Species: S. depressula

Binomial name
- Sydowiella depressula (P. Karst.) M.E. Barr, (1978)

Synonyms
- Gnomonia depressula P. Karst., (1873)

Species of fungus

Sydowiella depressula is a fungal plant pathogen that infects caneberries.
