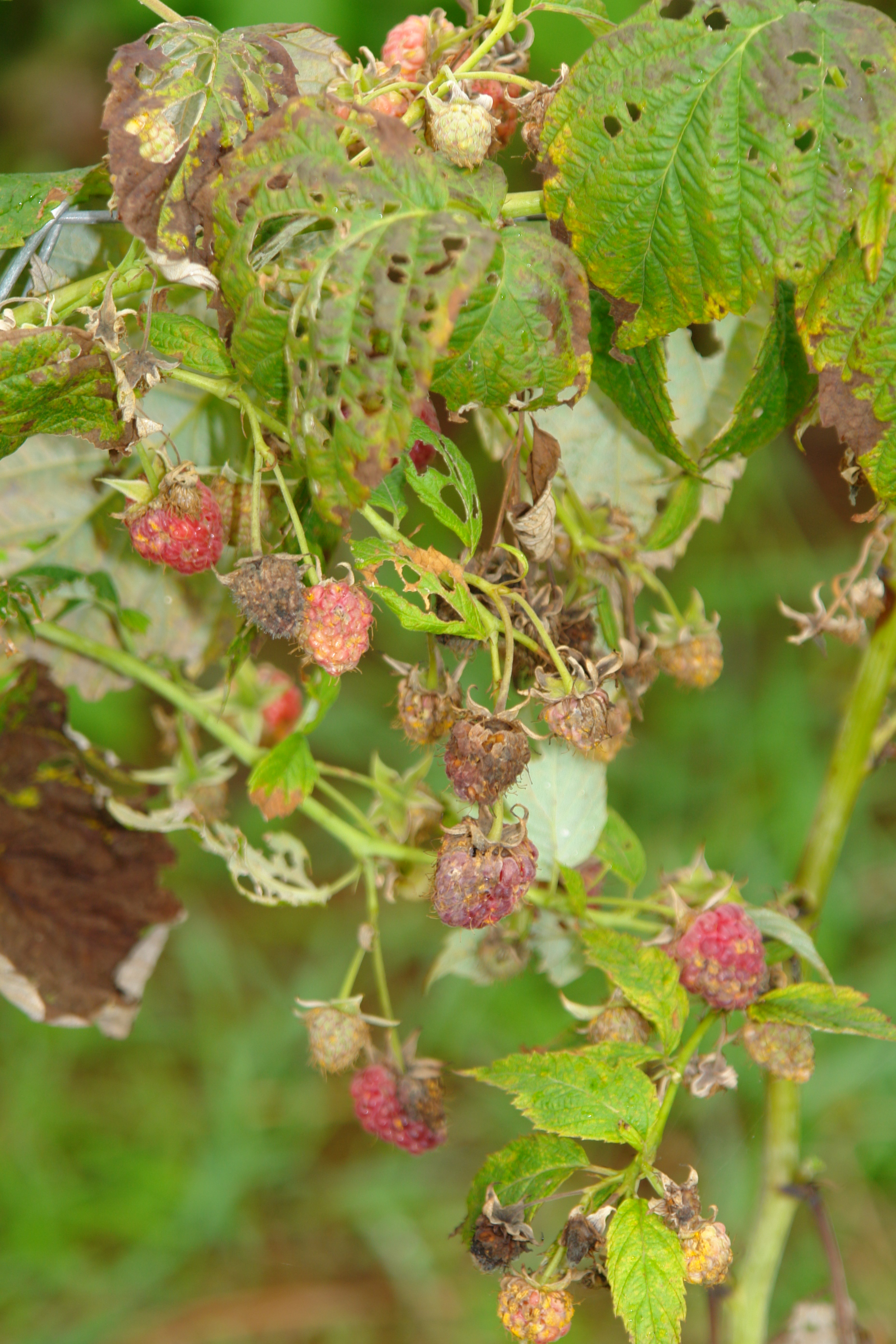

Scientific classification
- Kingdom: Fungi
- Division: Basidiomycota
- Class: Pucciniomycetes
- Order: Pucciniales
- Family: Pucciniastraceae
- Genus: Pucciniastrum
- Species: P. americanum

Binomial name
- Pucciniastrum americanum (Farl.) Arthur, (1920)

Synonyms
- Pucciniastrum arcticum var. americanum Farl., (1908)

= Pucciniastrum americanum =

Species of fungus

Pucciniastrum americanum is a plant pathogen infecting caneberries.

The leaves develop yellow spots that later turn into orange to brown rust pustules, usually on the underside of the leaf, and these pustules contain the fungal spores.
