= Neopseudocercosporella capsellae =

Scientific classification
- Kingdom: Fungi
- Division: Ascomycota
- Class: Dothideomycetes
- Order: Mycosphaerellales
- Family: Mycosphaerellaceae
- Genus: Neopseudocercosporella
- Species: N. capsellae

Binomial name
- Neopseudocercosporella capsellae (Ellis & Everh.) Videira & Crous

Synonyms
- Cercoseptoria capsellae Cercospora albomaculans Cercospora brassicae Cercospora raphanistri Cercosporella albomaculans Cercosporella brassicae Cercosporella conringiae Cercosporella goldbachiae Cercosporella litvinowiae Cercosporella malcolmiae Cercosporella nesliae Cercosporella nesliana Cercosporella rapistri Cylindrosporium brassicae Cylindrosporium capsellae Cylindrosporium nesliae Ovularia brassicae Pseudocercosporella capsellae Ramularia chorisporae Ramularia rapae Ramularia thelypodii

Species of fungus

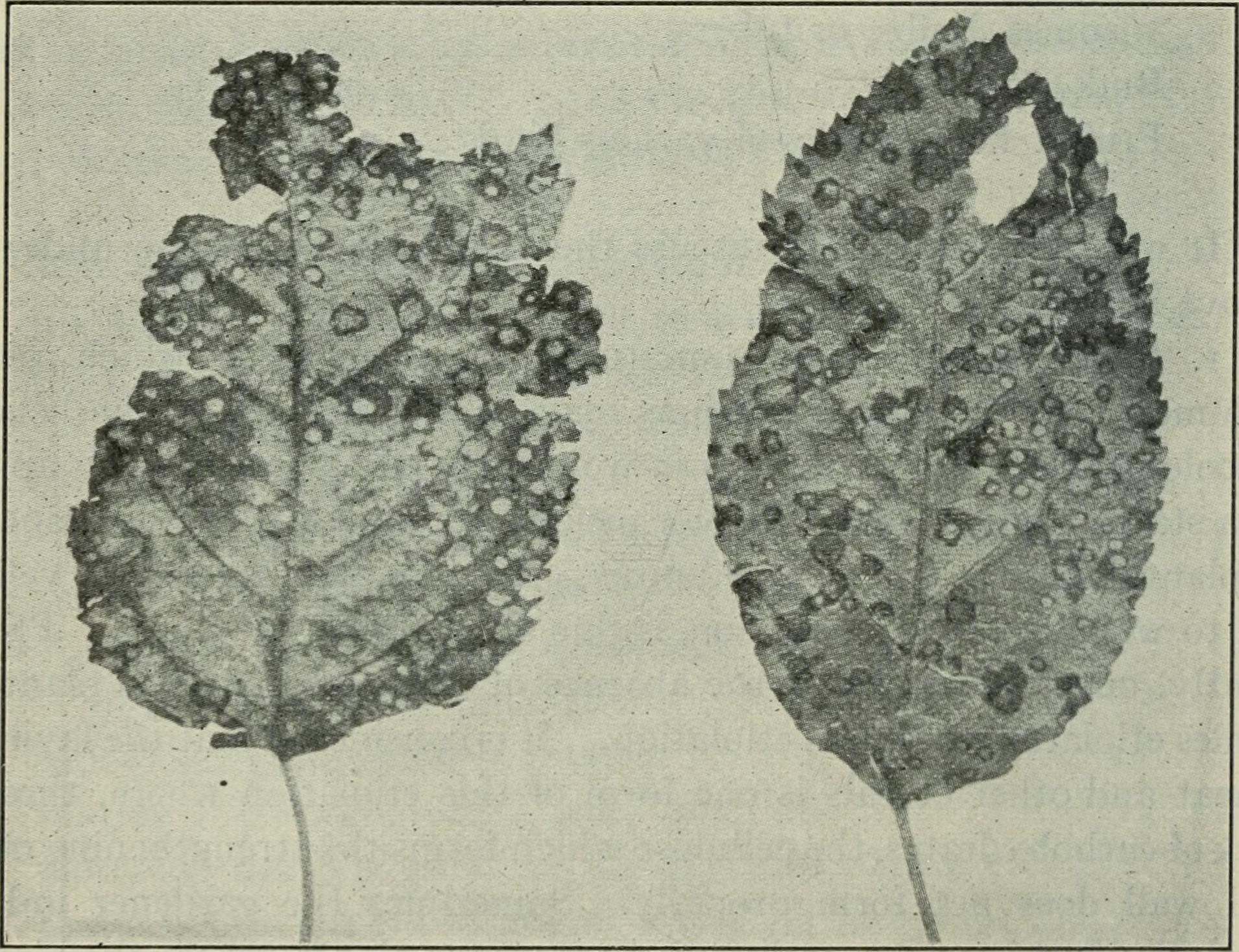
Pictured is a leaf with white leaf spot disease. Small lesions can be observed on the leaf, which is a symptom of N. capsellae. Conidia can be frequently found on the underside of these lesions.

Neopseudocercosporella capsellae (syn. Pseudocercosporella capsellae) is a plant pathogen infecting crucifers (canola, mustard, rapeseed). N. capsellae is the causal pathogen of white leaf spot disease, which is an economically significant disease in global agriculture. N. capsellae has a significant effect on crop yields on agricultural products, such as canola seed and rapeseed. Researchers are working hard to find effective methods of controlling this plant pathogen, using cultural control, genetic resistance, and chemical control practices. Due to its rapidly changing genome, N. capsellae is a rapidly emerging plant pathogen that is beginning to spread globally and affect farmers around the world.

== Habitat and geographical distribution ==
=== Habitat ===
Neopseudocercosporella capsellae is generally found in humid environments. When N. capsellae is found in environments with low humidity, the fungus is unable to germinate and cause disease. This pathogen is not a thermophile, explaining how it is found in temperate climates without extreme heat. After introduction into an area, N. capsellae is found in most neighboring Brassicaceae agricultural fields. In the wild, N. capsellae can be observed in prairie environments containing mustard weed.

=== Geographical distribution ===
Neopseudocercosporella capsellae has been identified on four of the seven continents of the world: North America, Europe, Asia, and Australia. Specifically, N. capsellae has been found in agricultural fields in China, Japan, Canada, India, Australia, the Pacific Northwest region of the United States, the United Kingdom, France, Poland, and Scandinavian nations.

== Morphology and microscopic features ==
Neopseudocercosporella capsellae is an ascomycete, meaning it produces ascospores housed in asci as means of sexual reproduction. Sexual structures are found in the sexual stage of this fungus, which has been classified as Mycosphaerella capsellae. The ascocarp of M. capsellae is a cleistothecium, meaning asci are shielded from the environment prior to ascospore release. As means of asexual reproduction, N. capsellae produces chains of septate conidia. Conidia range in size between about 42-71μm in length and about 3μm in width. These chains of conidia are attached to a long conidiophore and stipe, connecting these asexual structures to the sterile hyphal network of the fungal body. In culture, N. capsellae appears black and white on potato dextrose agar (PDA). When observed under a microscope, N. capsellae appears a reddish-purple color due to the fungus' production of a purple-pink pigment. N. capsellae also is known to produce a mycotoxin, cercosporin, which increases the virulence of the pathogen.

== Disease signs/symptoms, cycle, and control ==
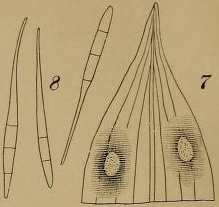
Conidia form septate chains on the undersides of leaves. These conidia are the primary means of spread for N. capsellae.

=== Disease signs and symptoms ===
Infected crucifers display white lesions on leaves when infected by N. capsellae. These white lesions oftentimes have nonuniform shapes, and darken as the fungus matures on its host. Lesions on leaves initially can be 1-2mm in diameter, but can grow up to 10mm in diameter as the disease progresses. Leaves can fall off of host plants if infection is severe and widespread throughout a particular host. Gray or tan lesions may also appear on host stems; these lesions oftentimes harbor the sexual stage of N. capsellae, where ascospores are developed and released. Conidia can be found on the underside of leaves, oftentimes in locations corresponding to where lesions are present.

=== Disease cycle ===
Conidia from the asexual structures of N. capsellae germinate at optimal temperatures of 20-24°C. At these temperate conditions and in ample humidity, conidia can be spread to new host plants via wind, water droplet splash, or by improperly sanitized farm equipment. These conidia penetrate new host leaves or stems and create infection. Crucifers, such as canola or rapeseed, are the primary host for this pathogen. In rare cases, cover crops or neighboring species of weeds can act as secondary hosts for the sexual stage of N. capsellae. N. capsellae overwinters as thick-walled mycelium on infected detritus in fields, and germinates again to infect new hosts as conditions become more ideal for spread. N. capsellae is a hemibiotroph, as indicated by its ability to keep host crucifers alive until host leaves fall off during severe infection.

=== Control strategies ===
Many management strategies have been implemented in attempt to control the spread of N. capsellae. One common method of control is the use of fungicides as means of chemical control. The use of fungicides has been discovered to be ineffective at the control of N. capsellae, as this pathogen is resistant to most of the common fungicides utilized by farmers.

Cultural control methods are the most common management strategy that farmers use against N. capsellae. Methods such as crop rotation, proper sanitation of farm equipment, and planting crucifer crops with more space in between crops are effective methods of managing the spread of N. capsellae in fields. Sanitation of farm equipment and crop rotation are methods of reducing initial inoculum of conidia produced by N. capsellae.

Breeding genetic resistance towards N. capsellae is a promising method for disease management of this pathogen. Researchers across the world have been conducting genetic crosses of Brassica crops to find resistance genes that can make crops less susceptible to N. capsellae infection. Although this method of control is promising, N. capsellae has a genome that is rapidly changing, making it difficult for researchers to identify host resistance genes that remain effective against N. capsellae for substantial periods of time.

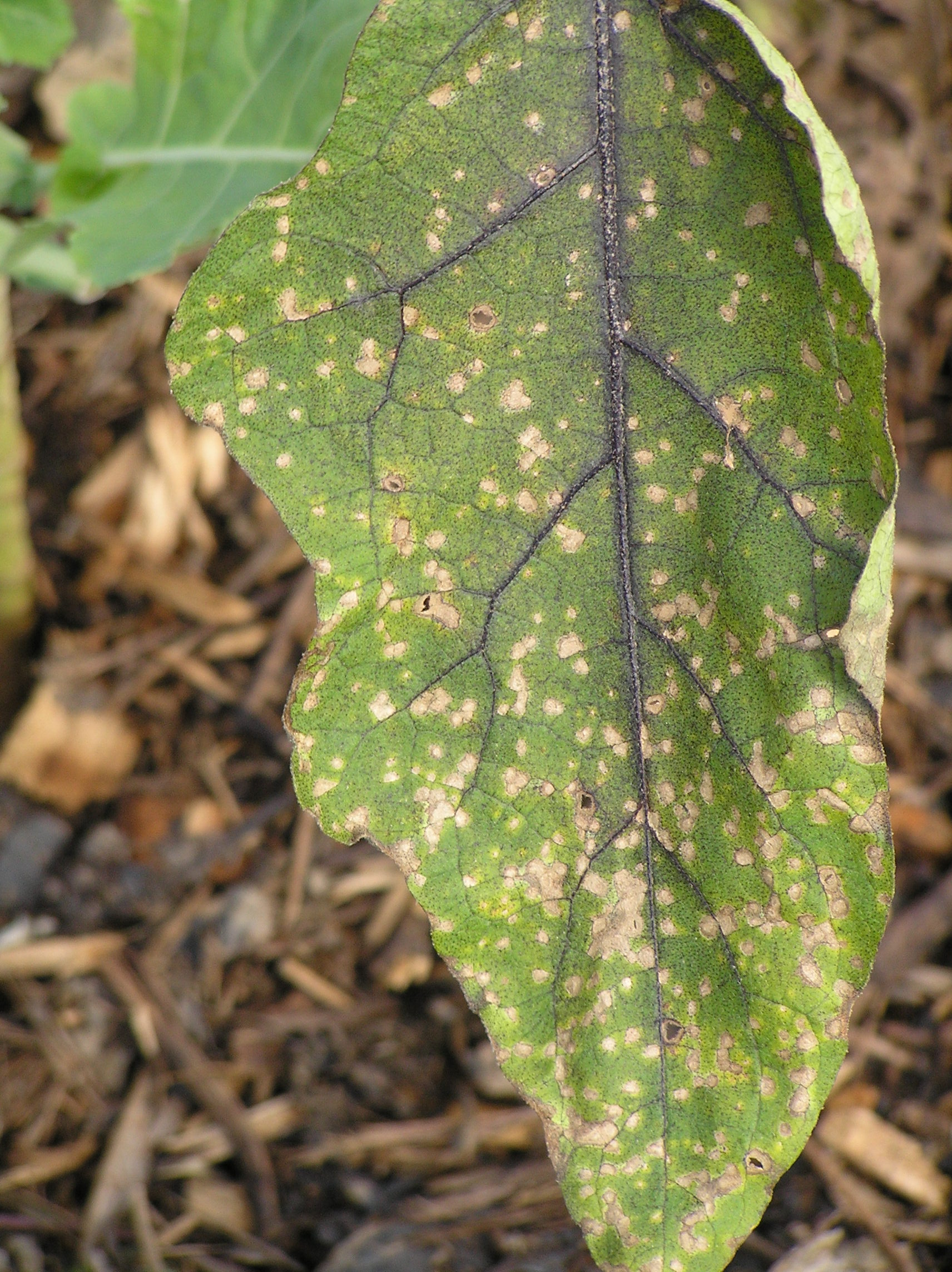
A severe infection by N. capsellae, or related pathogens (synonyms), can cause a high number of lesions and nutrient deficiency in leaves, causing death of leaf tissue.
