= Ascospora ruborum =

Scientific classification
- Kingdom: Fungi
- Division: Ascomycota
- Class: Ascomycetes
- Order: incertae sedis
- Family: incertae sedis
- Genus: Ascospora
- Species: A. ruborum

Binomial name
- Ascospora ruborum (Oudem.) Zeller (1925)

Synonyms
- Coryneum ruborum Oudem. (1894)

Species of fungus

Ascospora ruborum is a species of anamorphic ascomycete fungus. It is a plant pathogen that causes cane spot and dieback of raspberry and dewberry.
