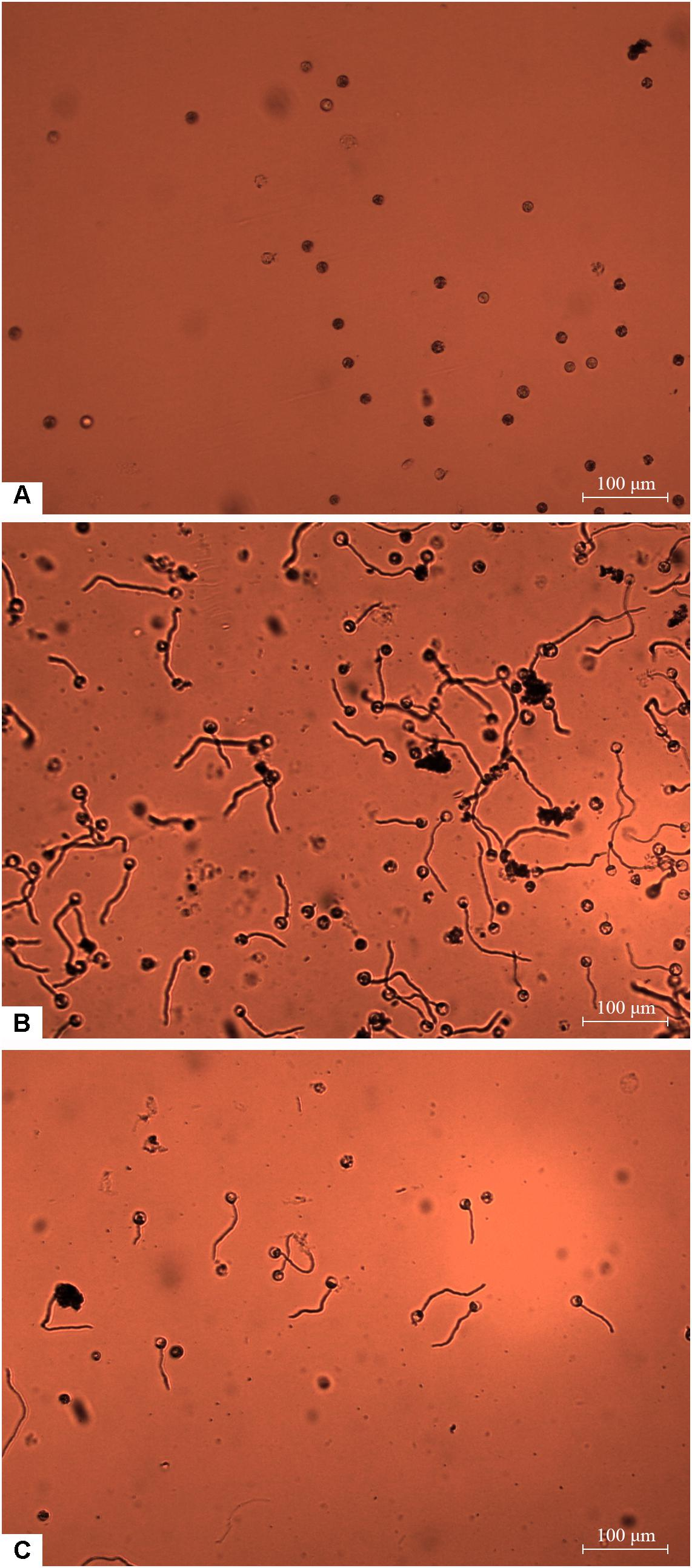
- Germination of Phytophthora erythroseptica zoospores

Scientific classification
- Domain: Eukaryota
- Supergroup: Stramenopiles
- Division: Oomycota
- Class: Peronosporomycetes
- Order: Peronosporales
- Family: Peronosporaceae
- Genus: Phytophthora
- Species: P. erythroseptica

Binomial name
- Phytophthora erythroseptica Pethybr., (1913)

Varieties
- Phytophthora erythroseptica var. pisi

= Phytophthora erythroseptica =

Species of single-celled organism

Phytophthora erythroseptica—also known as pink rot along with several other species of Phytophthora—is a plant pathogen. It infects potatoes (Solanum tuberosum) causing their tubers to turn pink and damages leaves. It also infects tulips (Tulipa) damaging their leaves and shoots.

Several species from the genus Phytophthora are believed to be involved in causing pink rot-like diseases.

== Disease cycle ==
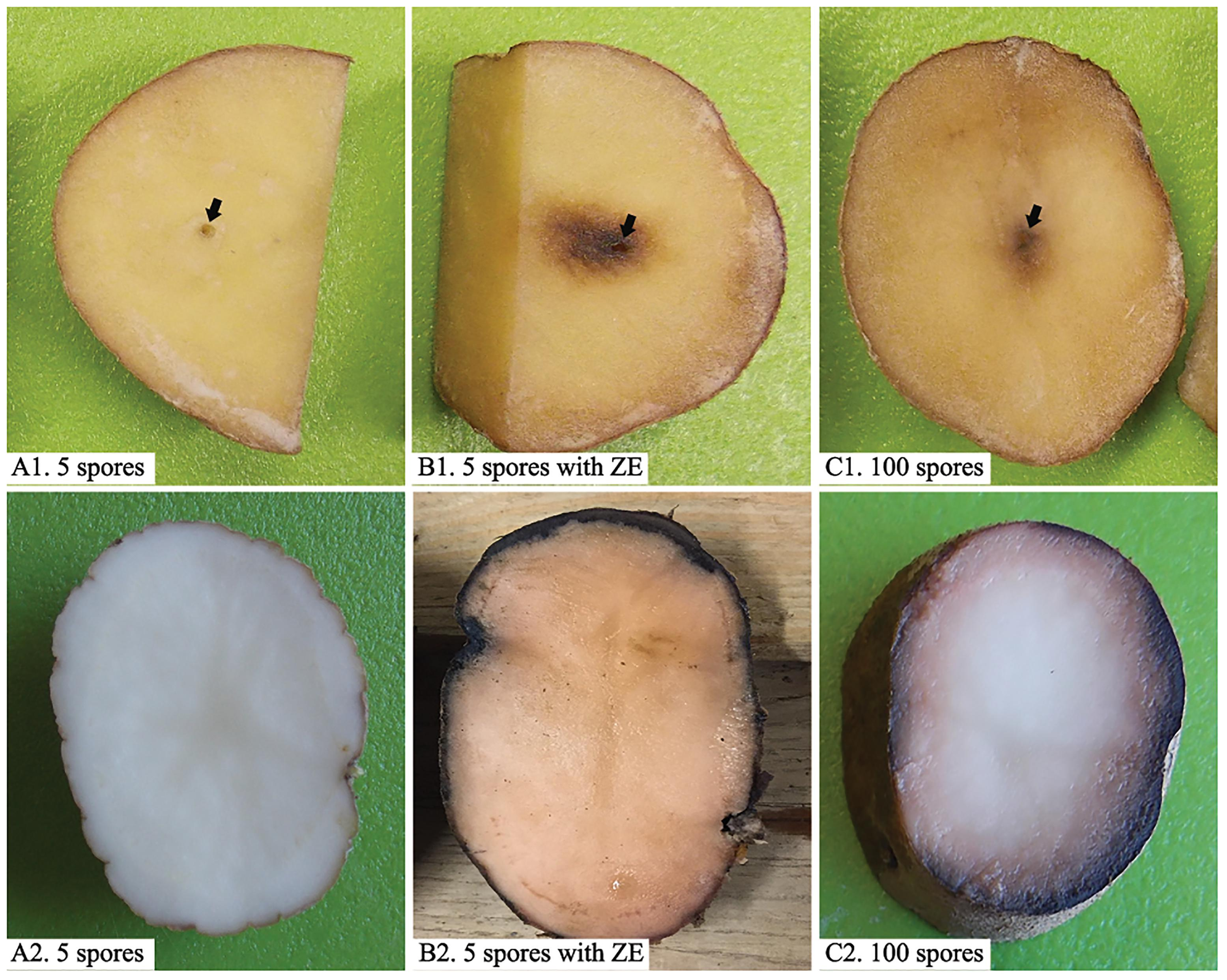
Inoculation of potato tubers (cv. "Russet Norkotah") with Phytophthora erythroseptica zoospores. Either tuber slices (upper panels) or whole tubers (lower panels) of potato were inoculated with 5 zoospores suspended in 10 μl sterile distilled water (A1,A2), 5 zoospores suspended in 10 μl exudate derived from high-density zoospore suspension (1 × 104 spores/ml) (B1,B2), and 100 zoospores suspended in 10 μl sterile distilled water (C1,C2). Arrows indicate inoculation position.

As Phytophthora erythroseptica is an oomycete, its disease cycle follows that of similar Phytophthora species. Oospores, sporangia, and zoospores can infect any part of the potato plant that is below ground. Oospores serve as the primary form of inoculum, and can survive in the soil as long as seven years Oospores produced in the field can overwinter and when thawed produce an oogonium and antheridium which will then lead to the production of sporangia, oospores, and zoospores. This pathogen can be polycyclic, using sporangia as the secondary inoculum. Often this secondary inoculum infects tubers post harvest while in storage. Zoospores are motile asexual spores that can move through soil water through the use of their flagella. These zoospores are also capable of encysting and infecting below ground plant tissue.

== Environmental conditions ==
Environmental factors play a critical role in the development and spread of P. erythroseptica on a field scale. This pathogen grows best in a warm and wet environment. It can infect a host without a wound, however the presence of a wound will increase infection greatly. A wound is needed for infection to occur when the tubers are in storage. Very moist fields will have increased rates of infection as the amount of moisture makes it easy for the zoospores to move through the soil and infect tubers. Avoiding excessive late-season irrigation is imperative to minimize the risk for infection developing in the field. Avoiding excess free moisture is also important when storing potatoes after harvest. Soil moisture levels that are close to field capacity, whether the water comes from rainfall or irrigation, have been shown to increase the likelihood of soil-borne diseases. This pathogen can also survive year to year as oospores in moist soil conditions, and also in volunteer potatoes or cull piles. Also, P. erythroseptica can germinate rapidly in warm soil conditions, thriving at temperatures around 77 °F (25 °C).

== Symptoms and host ==
P. erythroseptica is host specific, and typically only infects potatoes in moist soils. However, there are related pink rot species that infect raspberries, tomatoes, clover, and asparagus. Symptoms of the disease in potatoes can be seen on the tubers, above ground vegetation, as well as the roots of the potatoes. Tuber symptoms are the most obvious to diagnose. Occasionally, a darkened color can be observed on the skin covering the infected portion of the tuber. When a suspected tuber is cut open, a dividing line can be seen between the healthy tuber tissue and the infected tissue. Infection spreads from the stolon end of tubers and usually leads to a rubbery or spongy consistency. Pink rot is not considered a slimy soft rot, since most of the tissue stays intact The pinkish-salmon color of infected tubers can be seen once the phenolic compounds inside the tubers are exposed to oxygen for 15–30 minutes. After this time period the infected tissue turns to a brownish-blackish color Aboveground symptoms can include chlorosis, stunting, and wilting of the plants. Roots and stolons can become blackened as well. The pink color is often used as the main symptom when making a firm diagnosis. The infected tubers often are watery and have a distinct smell. The potatoes plants themselves can sometimes be wilted however most symptoms are seen on the tuber. The majority of diseased tubers get infected while in storage. The majority of symptoms are seen inside the tuber except for the rubbery appearance that the outside may have. There are often cases that show symptoms other than rotting, these are often due to a pathogen other than P. erythroseptica infecting the tuber along with pink rot.

== Management ==
A multi-faceted approach is recommended to control pink rot. Sanitation of fields to reduce the amount of residues and volunteer potatoes is important to remove sources of inoculum or places the pathogen can overwinter. A crop rotation of 3–4 years is recommended to limit the amount of surviving spores in the soil, which is the main form of inoculum. Most cultivars of potatoes currently in production are susceptible to pink rot; however, some are more resistant than others. Varieties that are particularly susceptible are Dark Red Norland, Red LaSoda, Russet Norkotah, and Snowden. Some cultivars with better resistance are Atlantic, FL-1900, and Ranger Russet. In areas that Pink Rot is known to occur, it is best to avoid extremely susceptible cultivars. Additionally, planting only certified seed, avoiding recently problematic fields, and monitoring soil moistures and conditions, are all recommended practices when planting potatoes. It is not recommended to plant potatoes when fields are wet, or in low spots that can retain water for lengthy periods. Careful and thoughtful harvesting is important to minimize the risk of disease development. This includes allowing a good skin set before harvest, minimizing damage while harvesting, avoiding harvesting potatoes from wet areas that are more susceptible or likely to be diseased, and avoid harvesting in temperatures greater than 65 °F (18 °C). Curing potatoes in conditions of high humidity and cool temperatures to promote wound healing, and storing potatoes with adequate air movement and cool temperatures can also help prevent disease.

Chemical control can be difficult due to resistance development to some fungicides. Also there are few fungicidal modes of action that are effective. This includes the formerly successful metalaxyl, which is now widely ineffective due to resistance exhibited in the pathogen. Mefenoxam is another fungicide that pink rot pathogens have shown resistance against. However, research has shown that a combination of mefenoxam and oxathiapiprolin has demonstrated effectiveness on suppressing pink rot. There have been studies done on phosphorous acid (Phostrol) as a systemic and contact fungicide against pink rot, but the exact mode of action has not yet been determined. Fluopicolide, part of the benzamide class of fungicides, has been shown to be effective at reducing pink rot on field scales. There has not yet been cross-resistance between fluopicolide and mefenoxam, meaning these fungicides can be used rotationally to minimize the development of resistance.

Metalaxyl and similar chemicals disrupt RNA polymerase and prevent transcription. These chemicals are often used about a month before harvest. However, resistance to pink rot is being tested and encouraged in new cultivars of potatoes.
