= Nectria mammoidea var. rubi =

Scientific classification
- Domain: Eukaryota
- Kingdom: Fungi
- Division: Ascomycota
- Class: Sordariomycetes
- Order: Hypocreales
- Family: Nectriaceae
- Genus: Nectria
- Species: N. mammoidea
- Variety: N. m. var. rubi

Trinomial name
- Nectria mammoidea var. rubi (Osterw.) Weese, (1912)

Synonyms
- Hypomyces rubi (Osterw.) Wollenw. Nectria rubi Osterw., (1911); Neonectria discophora var. rubi (Osterw.) Brayford & Samuels, (2004)

Fungal plant pathogen

Nectria mammoidea var. rubi is a plant pathogen that affects raspberry canes.
