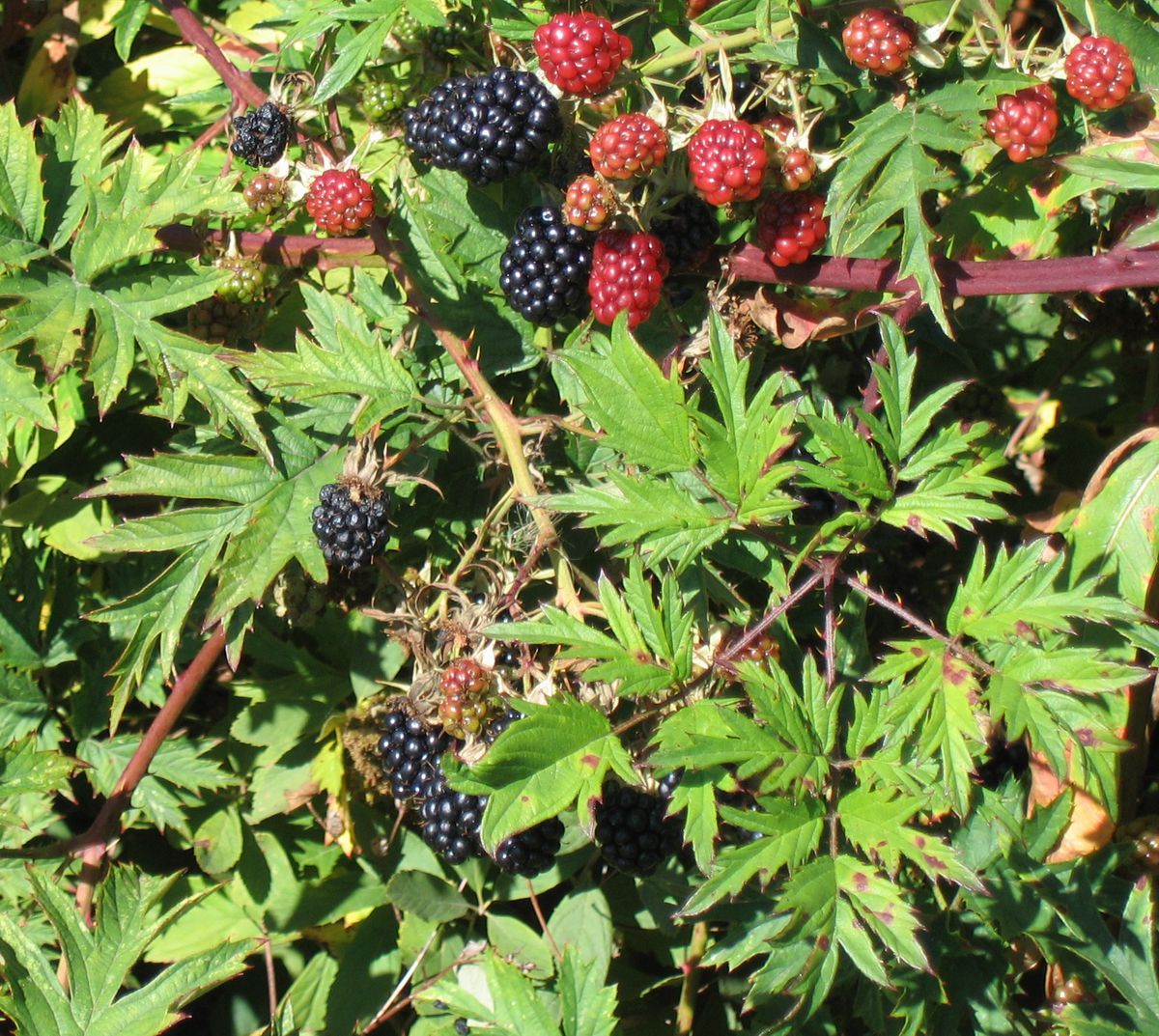

Scientific classification
- Kingdom: Plantae
- Clade: Embryophytes
- Clade: Tracheophytes
- Clade: Angiosperms
- Clade: Eudicots
- Clade: Rosids
- Order: Rosales
- Family: Rosaceae
- Genus: Rubus
- Species: R. laciniatus

Binomial name
- Rubus laciniatus Willd. 1806

= Rubus laciniatus =

Cutleaf evergreen blackberry

Berry and plant

Rubus laciniatus, the cutleaf evergreen blackberry or evergreen blackberry, is a European species of Rubus. It is an introduced species elsewhere, often being considered invasive.

== Description ==
Rubus laciniatus is an evergreen, bramble-forming shrub growing to 3 meters (10 feet) tall, with prickly shoots. The leaves are palmately compound, with five leaflets, each divided into deeply toothed subleaflets with jagged, thorny tips. The flowers have pink or white petals. Fruits are similar to the common blackberry, with a unique, fruitier flavour. Blackberries, including this species, are not true berries in the botanical sense.

The species is unusual in the genus in having 3-lobed petals and also in having deeply divided leaves.

The fruits of this plant are eagerly consumed by a number of animal species, including many birds and mammals. The thickets provide valuable cover for animals.

== Distribution and habitat ==
While originally native to Central and Northern Europe, it is an introduced species in Oceania and North America, and has become a weed and invasive species in forested habitats in the United States and Canada, particularly in the Northeast and along the Pacific Coast, as well as in Australia and New Zealand.

== Cultivation ==
Wild Rubus laciniatus has been grown for its fruits since 1770. Several commercially important blackberry cultivars have also been bred from it.
