= Wineberry latent virus =

Species of virus

Wineberry latent virus (WLV) is a plant pathogenic virus that is known to affect plants in the genus Rubus in Europe. The virions are elongated, but the strain has not been molecularly categorized.
