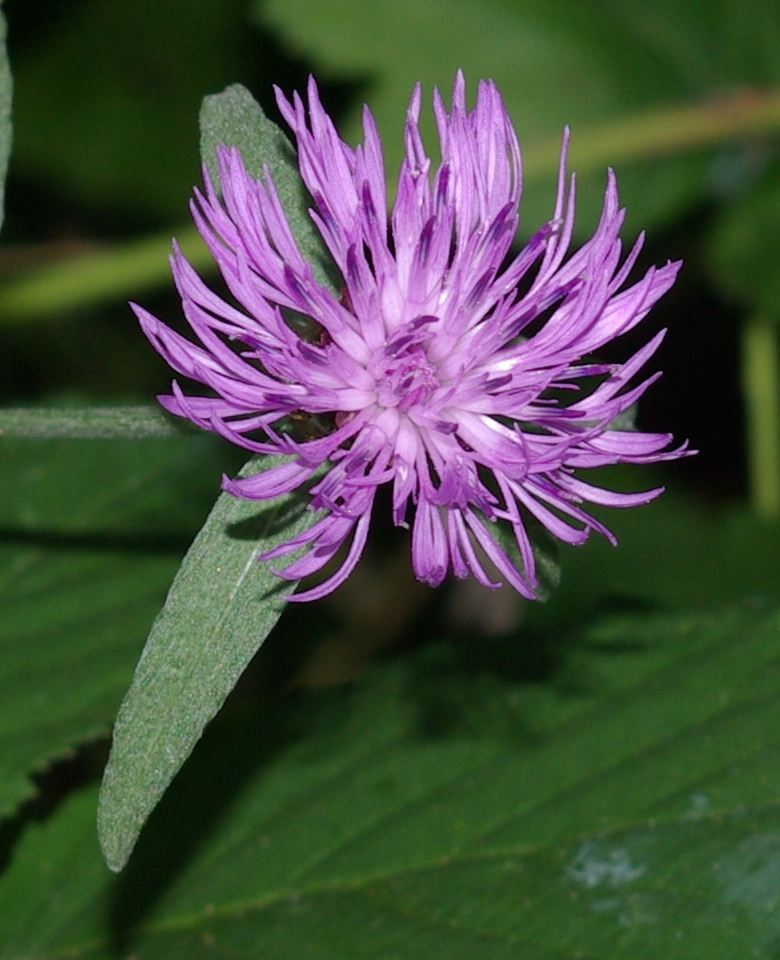

Scientific classification
- Kingdom: Plantae
- Clade: Tracheophytes
- Clade: Angiosperms
- Clade: Eudicots
- Clade: Asterids
- Order: Asterales
- Family: Asteraceae
- Genus: Centaurea
- Species: C. × gerstlaueri

Binomial name
- Centaurea × gerstlaueri Erdner

Synonyms
- Centaurea × jacea f. dumeticola Sennen; Centaurea × moncktonii C.E.Britton

= Meadow knapweed =

Species of flowering plant

Meadow knapweed (Centaurea × gerstlaueri), also known as hybrid knapweed or protean knapweed, is a fertile hybrid between black knapweed (Centaurea nigra) and brown knapweed (Centaurea jacea). The taxonomic status of the species is uncertain, and meadow knapweed has been variously described as different species.

== Description ==
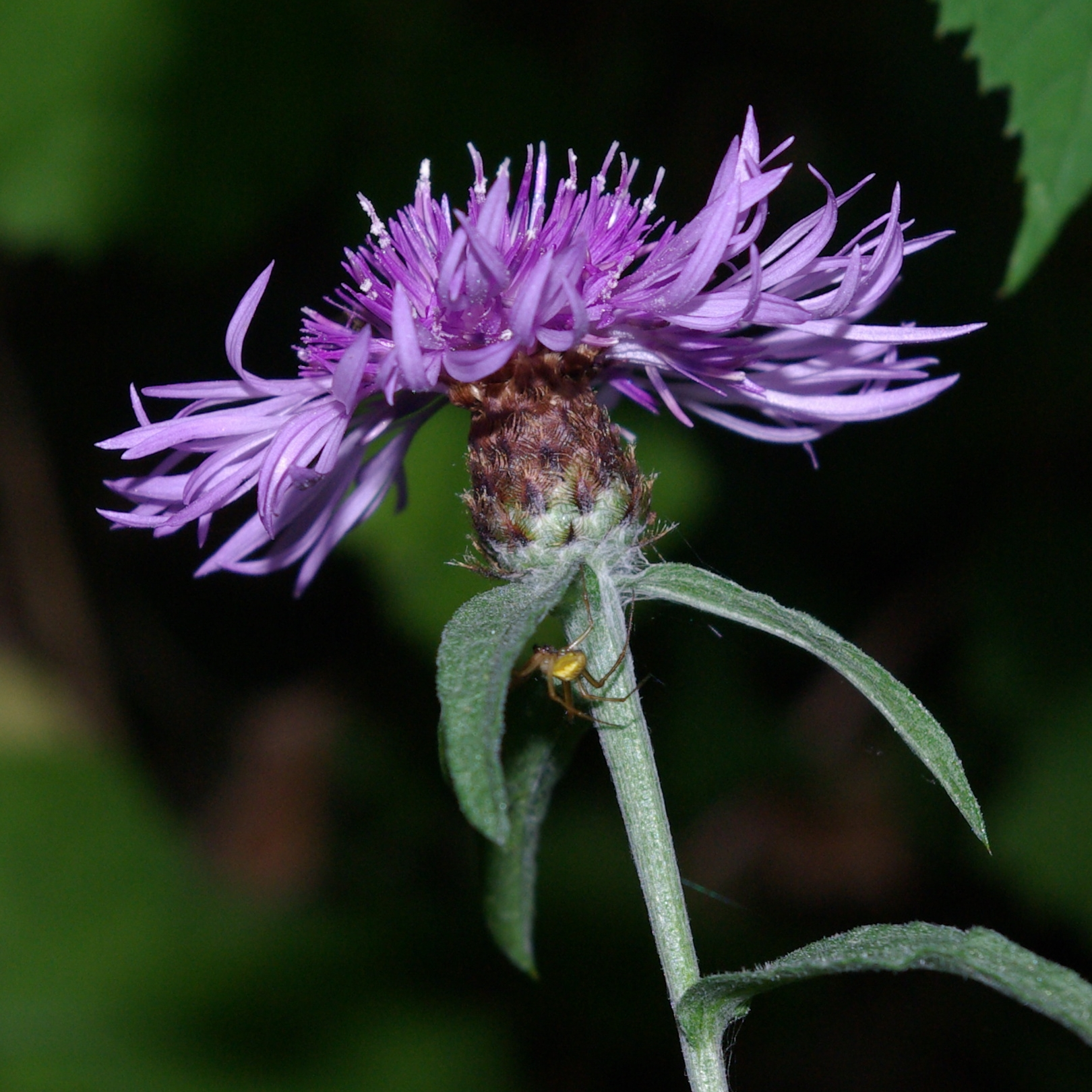
Meadow knapweed in Parksville, British Columbia

Meadow knapweed is a perennial forb that grows to 20–40 inches tall. The branched stems rise above a woody root crown. The seedlings have a tap root, but the mature plants develop a cluster of roots below the root crown. Meadow knapweed reproduces mostly by seed, but its root fragments can resprout after disturbance. The seeds naturally disperse only a few meters, but they can disperse further via animals, humans, vehicles, or water.

The leaves become progressively smaller up the stem. The lower leaves can have either smooth, coarsely lobed, or toothed edges, and can grow to 6 inches long and 1.5 inches wide. The upper leaves tend to have smooth edges and are almost like bracts.

Flowers are pink to reddish-purple, or occasionally white, the flowers are larger and showier than the flowers of other knapweeds. The flowerheads are about the size of a nickel and are more rounded than the flowerheads of other knapweeds. A single flowerhead tips the end of each branch. Underneath the flowerhead are distinctive light to dark-brown bracts with papery, fringed margins. Black knapweed has dark, comb-like bracts, while brown knapweed has rounded, papery tips. Meadow knapweed is intermediate between the two.

The fruit is an achene (a dry fruit with a single seed and thin walls that does not open at maturity; for example, a sunflower "seed"). The achenes are 1/8 inch long, and they are ivory-white to light brown. Seeds may retain viability for up to five years in the soil.

A hybrid itself, meadow knapweed hybridizes with yellow starthistle (Centaurea solstitialis) and diffuse knapweed (Centaurea diffusa).

== Habitat and ecology ==
Black knapweed was probably introduced to North America from ship ballast or as an ornamental. Brown knapweed was purposefully introduced to North America as a forage crop. Meadow knapweed arose as a hybrid of these two species. It is not very palatable to animals; therefore it easily outcompetes other forage species. Meadow knapweed prefers moist sites in full sunshine, infesting river banks, pipelines, roadsides, fields, and pastures. Once established, infestations of meadow knapweed are difficult to remove. Despite its invasive status, gardeners plant it as an ornamental or as a pollen source for honeybees.

Meadow knapweed is considered an invasive species and noxious weed in some areas. Meadow knapweed has the ability to out-compete grasses and other species used for livestock forage, and may take over native prairie and savannah ecosystems. It is common in ruderal areas such as roadsides, clear cuts, and industrial areas. It is a threat to native species such as Plagiobothrys hirtus.

The species is found widely on continental North America, as well as in South Africa and Australia.

== Management ==
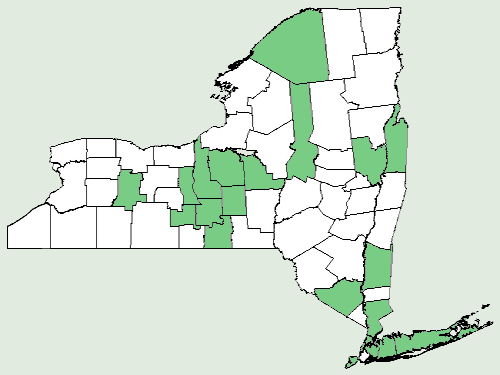
Occurrence in the State of New York

Meadow knapweed is considered a noxious weed in British Columbia, Idaho, Oregon, and Washington. Cultivating areas is shown to reduce populations of meadow knapweed. Hand removal can be effective, but herbicide use is recommended.

The weevil Larinus obtusus is used as a biological control. Larva of the weevil feed on seeds and adults damage the leaves. The flies Urophora affinis and U. quadrifasciata were introduced in the 1960s to combat knapweeds. The moth Metzneria paucipunctella has also been introduced as a control method. However, biological control alone is not a totally effective way of eradicating meadow knapweed.

== Taxonomy ==
The taxonomic status of this species is uncertain. It has been variously published as Centaurea × gerstlaueri, Centaurea debeauxii ssp. thuillieri, Centaurea jacea var. pratensis, Centaurea jacea subsp. × pratensis, Centaurea nigra var. radiata, and Centaurea thuillieri. The Invasive Species Compendium refers to meadow knapweed as Centaurea debeauxii.
