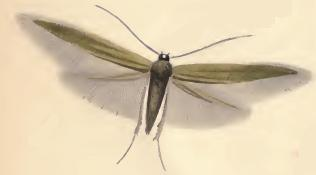

Scientific classification
- Kingdom: Animalia
- Phylum: Arthropoda
- Class: Insecta
- Order: Lepidoptera
- Family: Coleophoridae
- Genus: Coleophora
- Species: C. paripennella

Binomial name
- Coleophora paripennella Zeller, 1839

Synonyms
- Coleophora aereipennis Wocke, 1876

= Coleophora paripennella =

Species of moth

Coleophora paripennella is a moth of the family Coleophoridae. It is found in most of Europe, except the Iberian Peninsula and Balkan Peninsula.

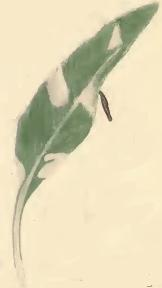
Mined leaf of Centaurea nigra with attached larva-case

Larva

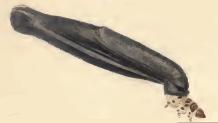
Larval case

The wingspan is 10–13 mm. Adults are metallic bronze with white-tipped dark antennae. Coleophora species have narrow blunt to pointed forewings and a weakly defined tornus. The hindwings are narrow-elongate and very long-fringed. The upper surfaces have neither a discal spot nor transverse lines. Each abdomen segment of the abdomen has paired patches of tiny spines which show through the scales. The resting position is horizontal with the front end raised and the cilia give the hind tip a frayed and upturned look if the wings are rolled around the body. C. paripennella characteristics include: Head shining greyish bronze. Antennae dark fuscous, apex white. Forewings rather dark fuscous, more or less bronzy-shining. Hindwings dark grey.

They are on wing from July to August.

The larvae feed on Arctium, Arnica, Carduus, Carlina, Centaurea jacea, Centaurea nigra, Cirsium arvense, Saussurea, Serratula tinctoria and Solidago species. Full-grown larvae can be from the end of May to early June.
