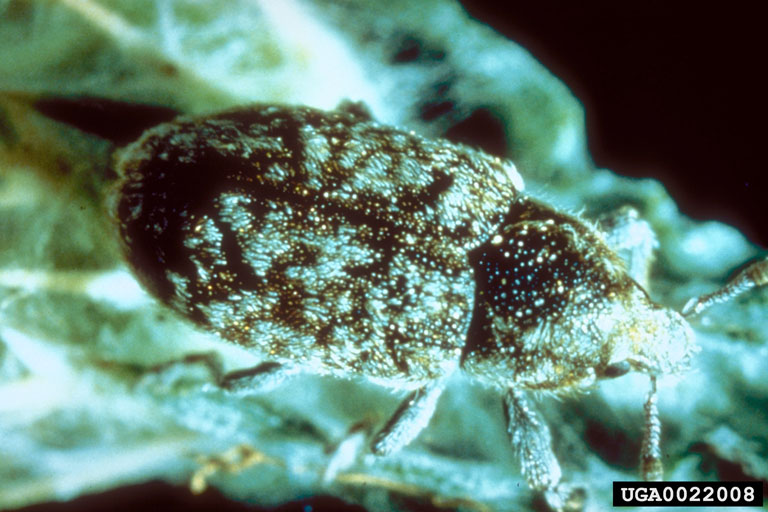

Scientific classification
- Kingdom: Animalia
- Phylum: Arthropoda
- Clade: Pancrustacea
- Class: Insecta
- Order: Coleoptera
- Suborder: Polyphaga
- Infraorder: Cucujiformia
- Superfamily: Curculionoidea
- Family: Curculionidae
- Genus: Bangasternus
- Species: B. fausti

Binomial name
- Bangasternus fausti (Reitter, 1890)

= Bangasternus fausti =

Species of beetle

Bangasternus fausti is a species of true weevil known as the broad-nosed seed head weevil. It is used as an agent of biological pest control against noxious knapweeds, particularly spotted knapweed (Centaurea maculosa), squarrose knapweed (Centaurea virgata ssp. squarrosa), and diffuse knapweed (Centaurea diffusa).

== Description ==
The adult weevil is dark gray and hairy and about 4 millimeters long. The female lays eggs on the flower heads at an early stage of development and stem tips. Upon emergence the larva burrows into the flower head or makes its way there by tunneling through the stem. It feeds upon the developing seeds, often consuming them entirely. If any other insects invade the flower head, the larva attacks them. It pupates inside the seed head.

This weevil is native to southern Europe and the Middle East. It was first released as a knapweed biocontrol in the 1980s in Oregon, and it is currently established in the Pacific Northwest. It is host-specific to invasive knapweeds and has not been known to attack any native plants.
