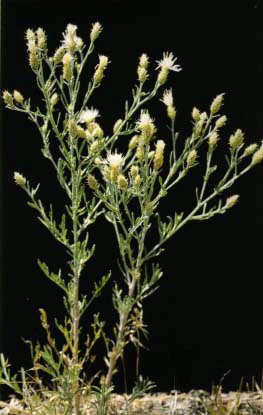
- Centaurea diffusa in flower

Scientific classification
- Kingdom: Plantae
- Clade: Embryophytes
- Clade: Tracheophytes
- Clade: Angiosperms
- Clade: Eudicots
- Clade: Asterids
- Order: Asterales
- Family: Asteraceae
- Genus: Centaurea
- Species: C. diffusa

Binomial name
- Centaurea diffusa Lam., Encycl. Méth. Bot., 1: 675-676, 1785

= Centaurea diffusa =

Species of flowering plant

Centaurea diffusa, also known as diffuse knapweed, white knapweed or tumble knapweed, is a member of the genus Centaurea in the family Asteraceae. This species is common throughout western North America but is not actually native to the North American continent, but to the eastern Mediterranean.

== Description ==
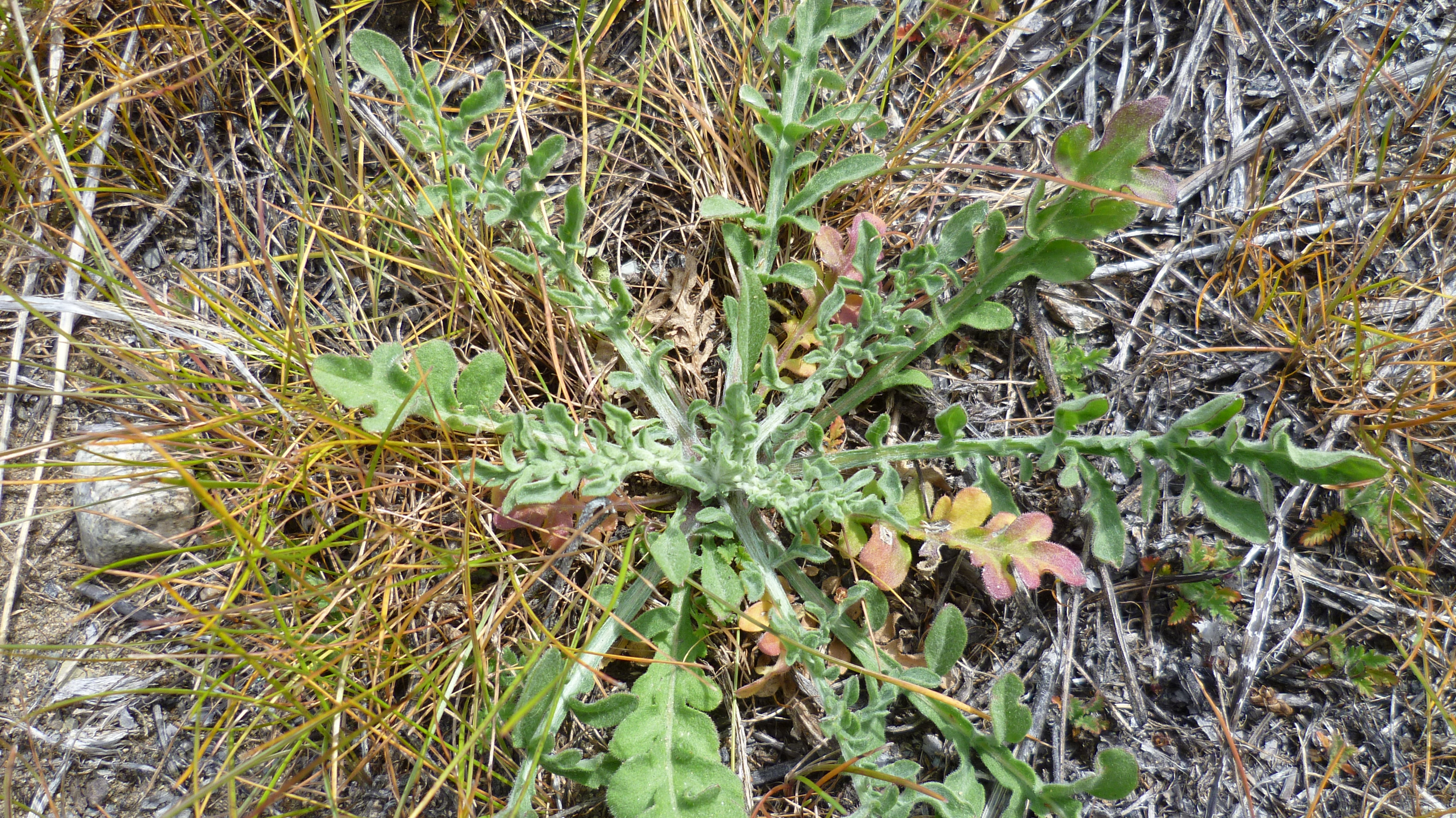
Centaurea diffusa basal rosette, first year plant

Diffuse knapweed is an annual or biennial plant, generally growing to between 10 and 60 cm in height. It has a highly branched stem and a large taproot, as well as a basal rosette of leaves with smaller leaves alternating on the upright stems. Flowers are usually white or pink and grow out of urn-shaped heads carried at the tips of the many branches. Diffuse knapweed often assumes a short rosette form for one year, reaching maximum size, then rapidly growing and flowering during the second year. A single plant can produce approximately 18,000 seeds.

== Synonyms ==
- Centaurea microcalathina Tarassov
- Centaurea cycladum Heldr.
- Centaurea parviflora Sibth. & Sm., non Desf.
- Centaurea comperiana Steven

== Distribution ==
It is native to Eastern Europe and Western Asia, specifically the nations of Turkey, Syria, Bulgaria, Greece, Romania, Ukraine, and southern Russia.

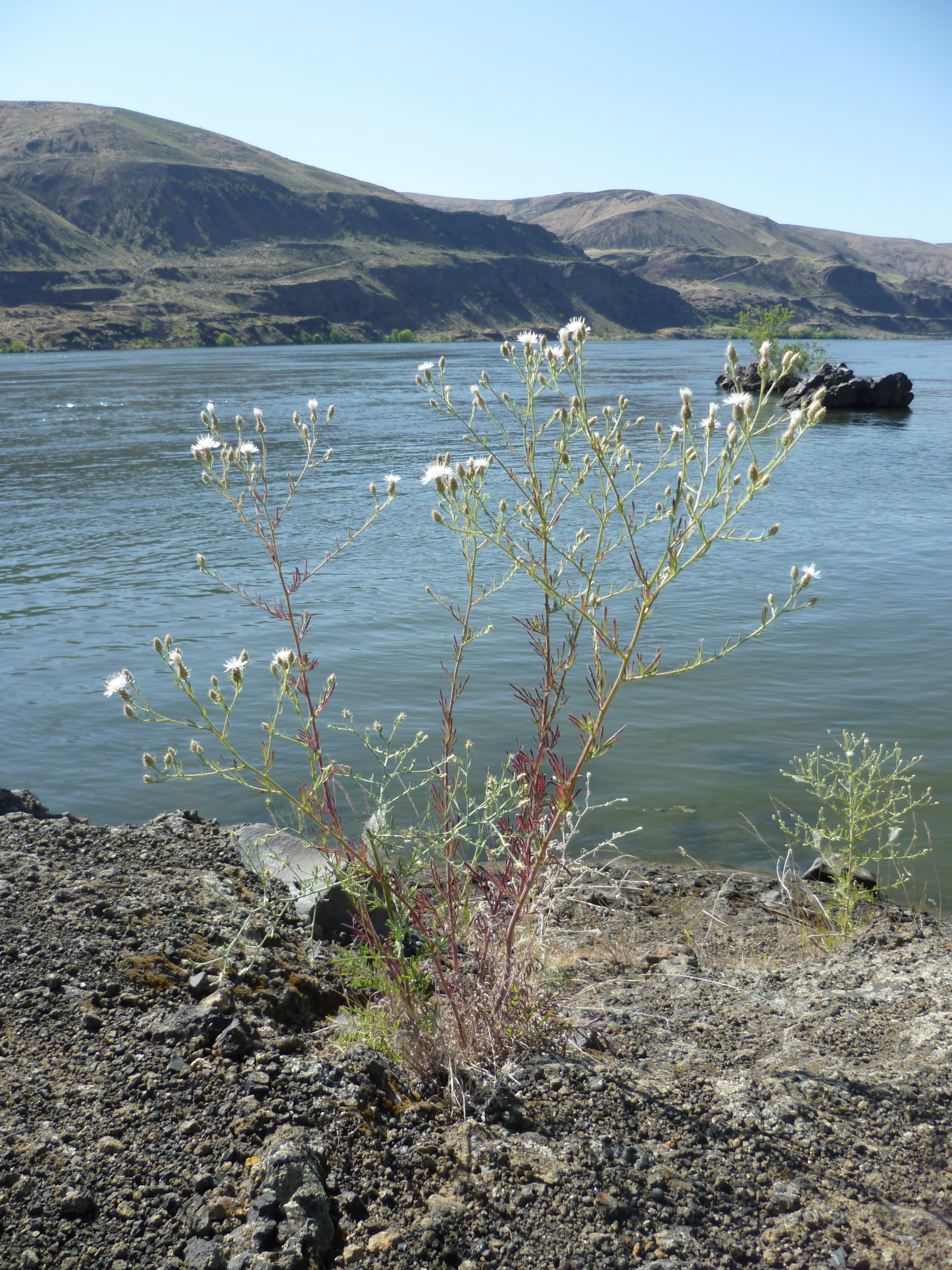
Centaurea diffusa next to the Columbia River, Douglas County Washington

== Invasive species ==
Diffuse knapweed is considered an invasive species in some parts of North America, having established itself in many areas of the continent. C. diffusa was first identified in North America in 1907 when it was found in an alfalfa field in Washington state. The seeds had presumably been transported in an impure alfalfa seed shipment coming from somewhere in the species native range. Now present in at least 19 states in the United States, it has naturalized in all contiguous states west of the Rockies and additionally in Connecticut, Massachusetts, and New Jersey. Portions of western Canada have also been colonized by this plant.

Areas in which diffuse knapweed has been established generally are plains rangelands or forest benchlands. Land that has recently been disturbed is commonly colonized. It grows in semi-arid and arid environments and seems to favor light, dry, porous soils. Areas with large amounts of shade or high levels of water discourage diffuse knapweed growth.

C. diffusa can be dispersed in multiple ways, such as contamination of food, wind dispersal, and water dispersal however wind is the primary dispersal method.

=== Effects ===
By 1998 diffuse knapweed had naturalized over 26,640 square kilometres (10,290 sq mi) in the western US, and was increasing its range at a rate of 18% annually. Diffuse knapweed can establish itself in grassland, scrubland and riparian environments. It has little value as feed for livestock, as its thistles can damage the mouth and digestive tract of animals that attempt to feed on it. A study in 1973 concluded that ranches lost approximately US$20/km^{2} (8 cents per acre) of diffuse knapweed due to decreased grazing area. In an agricultural setting, it can greatly reduce crop yield and purity.

=== Control ===
Effective control of diffuse knapweed requires a fusion of well-executed land management, biological control, physical control, chemical control and reestablishment of the native species. Any method of control must ensure that the root is removed or the plant will grow back. Additionally, native plant growth in areas where diffuse knapweed has been removed should be encouraged to prevent reestablishment.

==== Biological control ====
Biological control involves the introduction of organisms, usually natural competitors of the invasive species, into the invaded environment in order to control the invasive species. Since 1970, 12 insects have been released to control diffuse knapweed. Of these 12, 10 have become established, and 4 are widely established (Urophora affinis and Urophora quadrifasciata, the root boring beetle, Sphenoptera jugoslavica, and the weevil Larinus minutus). Research based on simulation models have shown that for biocontrol agents to be effective, they must kill their host, otherwise plants can compensate by having increased seedling survival.

Some of the more commonly utilized biocontrol agents are the Lesser knapweed flower weevil and the Knapweed root weevil. Individuals of these species lay their eggs on the seed heads of both diffuse and spotted knapweed. When the larvae emerge from the eggs, they feed upon the seeds of their host plant. As the females of this species can create from 28 to 130 eggs and each larva can consume an entire seed head, an adequate population of Larinus minutus can devastate entire stands of knapweed. The adult weevils feed upon the stems, branches, leaves and undeveloped flower buds. It is native to Greece and is now found in Montana, Washington, Idaho and Oregon. Insects are also used for biocontrol, such as the Yellow-winged knapweed root moth (Agapeta zoegana), and several species of Tephritid flies, mostly Urophora affinis and Urophora quadrifasciata.

==== Physical control ====
Physical control of diffuse knapweed primarily comprises cutting, digging or burning to remove the plants.

Cutting

While cutting the aboveground portion of diffuse knapweed will greatly decrease the spread of seeds, it does not remove the root. With only its root still intact, diffuse knapweed can survive and continue to grow. For a program of cutting to be effective, it must be long-term so that the effect of reduced seed spreading can be realized.

Digging

this removes both the portion above ground and the root of diffuse knapweed and has shown to be very effective; if the plant is properly disposed of, it can neither regrow nor spread its seeds. The largest problem with digging knapweed is that it is extremely labor-intensive. Additionally, the recently vacated soil should be planted with a native species to avoid knapweed reintroducing itself in the disturbed soil.

Burning

setting fire to a crowd of knapweed, if the fire is sufficiently severe, can successfully destroy the above ground and belowground sections of diffuse knapweed. However, precautions must be taken to first ensure that the fire is properly contained and that a new plant community is established to prevent the reintroduction of diffuse knapweed.

==== Chemical control ====
Chemical control involves the use of herbicides to control diffuse knapweed. The herbicide Tordon (picloram) is recognized as the most effective, but it is common to use multiple herbicides in order to reduce strain on local grasses. The herbicides 2,4-D, dicamba, and glyphosate are also effective for control. In order to be most effective, it must be applied before the knapweed plants have released their seeds, regardless of which herbicide is used. Ongoing research at the University of Colorado suggests that Tordon treatment does not contribute to long-term reductions of exotic species cover and may contribute to recruitment of other invasive species, such as redstem filaree and Japanese brome, which quickly take the place of herbicide-treated diffuse knapweed.

=== Human influence on invasion ===
One of the first influences humans had on diffuse knapweed was to inadvertently introduce it to North America.

Diffuse knapweed is known to establish more easily and effectively in recently disturbed environments. Disturbed environments generally present low environmental stress because more resources are available than are being used. These available resources often allow the establishment of an invasion in an ecological community. The concentration of diffuse knapweed in such an area is often linked to the level of soil disturbance. Human disturbances often lead to less species diversity in a community. In turn, less species diversity can lead to unused resources, which allow invasive species to more readily establish. Areas such as fallow land, ditches, rangelands, residential and industrial districts and roadsides are all disturbed habitats where diffuse knapweed frequently establishes. Additionally, the removal of foliage and other ground cover increases the likelihood that seeds will come in contact with the soil and germinate.

The largest impact of humans on diffuse knapweed is efforts in controlling and eradicating its invasive populations. Besides reducing the spread of diffuse knapweed, efforts are also providing selective pressure against the individuals that cannot withstand a certain method of control. Selective pressure, given sufficient time, can cause the adaptation or evolution of invasive species such as diffuse knapweed. If an individual diffuse knapweed plant survives control efforts because of a trait it possesses, its progeny will make up a greater portion of the population than the plants that succumbed to the control.

=== Toward an integrated control strategy ===
To successfully control diffuse knapweed, an understanding of the mechanism that allows it to be invasive must be developed. Isolating the reason for its invasiveness would allow control methods designed to specifically target the effectiveness of that mechanism to be developed. Additionally, precautions designed to minimize the invisibility of at-risk environments could be carried out.

=== Summary ===
The success of diffuse knapweed must be attributed to a combination of several mechanisms. Its invasiveness is due to a mix of allelopathy, the enemy release hypothesis (ERH) and superior resource competition. However, the most importance must be attributed to the ERH because diffuse knapweed, while a very effective invasive species in its novel environment, is non-invasive and doesn't establish monocultures in its native range. It is the differences, biotic and abiotic, between its novel and native surroundings that cause it to be invasive.

To demonstrate that the ERH applies to diffuse knapweed, it is essential to show that the absence of natural enemies has a significant positive effect on its success. One way to show this is to observe the effect of introducing some of diffuse knapweed's natural enemies into its novel environment. If diffuse knapweed, which generally thrives in its invaded environment, is significantly inhibited through the introduction of natural enemies, it can be concluded that diffuse knapweed is more competitive in the absence of its natural enemies. A recent effort at biocontrol of diffuse knapweed in Idaho's Camas County effectively reduced 80 square kilometres (20,000 acres) of knapweed to minimal levels through the release of the lesser knapweed flower weevil and the knapweed root weevil. Since both of the insects released are natural competitors of diffuse knapweed, and since this and other similar efforts at biocontrol have been successful, there is significant evidence that diffuse knapweed benefits from the absence of its natural enemies.

Another aspect of diffuse knapweed's success relies on the effect of its allelopathic chemicals in its novel environment. Although there is still debate concerning the effectiveness of allelopathic chemicals in the field, the evidence of allelopathic effects demonstrated in a laboratory setting and its propensity to establish monocultures support the importance of allelopathy to diffuse knapweed's success.

Curiously, diffuse knapweed's allelopathic chemicals were shown to have a deleterious effect on the North American competitors but were beneficial to its native competitors. While diffuse knapweed's native competitors are able to compete more effectively in the presence of allelopathic chemicals, the novel competitor's fitness is decreased. This situation provides an example of the effectiveness of the allelopathy mechanism benefiting from the ERH. The increased effectiveness of allelopathic chemicals cause diffuse knapweed to experience less competitive pressure. As a result, diffuse knapweed is able to establish more predominantly in this new area.

Another connection between allelopathy and the ERH is the fact that concentrations of allelopathic chemicals were found to increase when diffuse knapweed was planted in North American soil as opposed to Eurasian soil. This effect is probably due to the absence of unfavorable soil conditions or soil microorganisms that exist in its native environment. As a result, the allelopathic chemicals will be able to reach higher concentrations, spread farther and therefore be more effective. By effecting more neighboring plants, the favorable changes in soil condition contribute to the success of diffuse knapweed.

Besides the advantages that diffuse knapweed gains from the ERH and allelopathy, it also possesses several characteristically invasive traits. One factor leading to the superior resource competition of diffuse knapweed is its ability to exist in drought conditions. This advantage allows diffuse knapweed to devote its resources to competition while its neighbors are conserving resources to survive. The high number of seeds produced by diffuse knapweed is also a common trait of invasive plants. A higher density of knapweed will not only increase the concentration of allelopathic chemicals in the soil but will also restrict the nutrients available to native plants. Unfortunately, very little research has been conducted to determine the relative competitive ability between diffuse knapweed and its novel competitors. However, tests conducted on the effect of diffuse knapweed on North American grasses in the absence on allelopathic chemicals demonstrated that the fitness of these grasses declined in the presence of diffuse knapweed.

Diffuse knapweed is successful in its novel range primarily because the organisms and conditions that prevent it from becoming invasive in its native environment are absent. It follows that the introduction of species from its native habitat would be an effective method of control. However, the introduction of a non-native organism has the potential to result in another invasive species outbreak. Therefore, any method of biological control must be preceded by analysis of possible effects.

== Phytochemicals ==
The roots of Centaurea diffusa release 8-hydroxyquinoline, which has a negative effect on plants that have not co-evolved with it.

== Sources ==
1. Washington State weed info: Diffuse knapweed
2. Diffuse Knapweed (Centaurea diffusa)
3. Baker, H. G. (1974). "The Evolution of Weeds". Annual Review of Ecology and Systematics. 5: 1–24. doi:10.1146/annurev.es.05.110174.000245.
4. K. Bossick, Wood River Journal. A16 (2004).
5. Callaway, Ragan M.; Ridenour, Wendy M. (2004). "Novel weapons: invasive success and the evolution of increased competitive ability". Frontiers in Ecology and the Environment. 2 (8): 436–443. doi:10.1890/1540-9295(2004)002[0436:NWISAT]2.0.CO;2. ISSN 1540-9295.
6. Callaway, Ragan M.; Aschehoug, Erik T. (2000). "Invasive Plants Versus Their New and Old Neighbors: A Mechanism for Exotic Invasion". Science. 290 (5491): 521–523. Bibcode:2000Sci...290..521C. doi:10.1126/science.290.5491.521. PMID 11039934.
7. Carpenter, Alan T.; Murray, Thomas A. "ELEMENT STEWARDSHIP ABSTRACT for Centaurea diffusa Lamarck (synonym Acosta diffusa (Lam.) Sojak) diffuse knapweed" (PDF).
8. Chou, Chang-Hung (1999). "Roles of Allelopathy in Plant Biodiversity and Sustainable Agriculture". Critical Reviews in Plant Sciences. 18 (5): 609–636. doi:10.1080/07352689991309414.
9. Clements, David R.; Di Tommaso, Antonio; Jordan, Nicholas; Booth, Barbara D.; Cardina, John; Doohan, Douglas; Mohler, Charles L.; Murphy, Stephen D.; Swanton, Clarence J. (December 2004). "Adaptability of plants invading North American cropland". Agriculture, Ecosystems & Environment. 104 (3): 379–398. doi:10.1016/j.agee.2004.03.003.
10. Colautti, Robert I.; Ricciardi, Anthony; Grigorovich, Igor A.; MacIsaac, Hugh J. (2004). "Is invasion success explained by the enemy release hypothesis?". Ecology Letters. 7 (8): 721–733. doi:10.1111/j.1461-0248.2004.00616.x.
11. Fielding, D. J.; Brusven, M. A.; Kish, L. P. (1996). "Consumption of diffuse knapweed by two species of polyphagous grasshoppers (Orthoptera: Acrididae) in southern Idaho". Great Basin Naturalist. 562: 22–27.
12. Harrod, R. J.; Taylor, R. J. (1995). "Reproduction and pollination biology of Centaurea and Acroptilon species, with emphasis on C. diffusa". Northwest Science. 69: 97–105.
13. Hierro, José L.; Callaway, Ragan M. (2003). "Allelopathy and exotic plant invasion". Plant and Soil. 256 (1): 29–39. doi:10.1023/A:1026208327014. S2CID 40416663.
14. Jacobs, James S.; Sheley, Roger L. (November 1999). "Grass Defoliation Intensity, Frequency, and Season Effects on Spotted Knapweed Invasion". Journal of Range Management. 52 (6): 626–632. doi:10.2307/4003633. hdl:10150/643948. JSTOR 4003633.
15. Keane, Ryan M.; Crawley, Michael J. (2002). "Exotic plant invasions and the enemy release hypothesis". Trends in Ecology & Evolution. 17 (4): 164–170. doi:10.1016/S0169-5347(02)02499-0.
16. Kiemnec, G.; Larson, L. (1991). "Germination and root growth of two noxious weeds as affected by water and salt stresses". Weed Technology. 5 (3): 612–615. doi:10.1017/S0890037X00027421. S2CID 82798671.
17. Zouhar, K. (2001). "Centaurea diffusa". Fire Effects Information System, [Online]. U.S. Department of Agriculture, Forest Service, Rocky Mountain Research Station, Fire Sciences Laboratory (Producer).
18. Larson, L. "Centaurea diffusa". Global invasive species database. Invasive Species Specialist Group.
19. Larson, L.; Kiemnec, G. (2003). "Seedling growth and interference of diffuse knapweed and bluebunch wheatgrass". Weed Technol. 17: 79–83. doi:10.1614/0890-037X(2003)017[0079:SGAIOD]2.0.CO;2. S2CID 85650873.
20. Maron, J. L.; Vila, M.; Bommarco, R.; Elmendorf, S.; Beardsley, P. (2004). "Rapid evolution of an invasive plant". Ecol. Monogr. 74 (2): 261–280. doi:10.1890/03-4027.
21. Mizutani, Junya (1999). "Selected Allelochemicals". Crit. Rev. Plant Sci. 18 (5): 653–671. doi:10.1080/07352689991309432.
22. Müller-Schärer, Heinz; Schaffner, Urs; Steinger, Thomas (2004). "Evolution in invasive plants: implications for biological control" (PDF). Trends in Ecology & Evolution. 19 (8): 417–422. doi:10.1016/j.tree.2004.05.010. PMID 16701299.
23. Palmer, Miquel; Linde, Marta; Pons, Guillem X. (December 2004). "Correlational patterns between invertebrate species composition and the presence of an invasive plant". Acta Oecologica. 26 (3): 219–226. Bibcode:2004AcO....26..219P. doi:10.1016/j.actao.2004.05.005.
24. Powell, R. D. (1990). "The role of spatial pattern in the population biology of Centaurea diffusa". Journal of Ecology. 78 (2): 374–388. doi:10.2307/2261118. JSTOR 2261118.
25. Rice, Elroy L. (1977). "Some roles of allelopathic compounds in plant communities". Biochemical Systematics and Ecology. 5 (3): 201–206. doi:10.1016/0305-1978(77)90005-9.
26. Sakai, Ann K.; Allendorf, Fred W.; Holt, Jodie S.; Lodge, David M.; Molofsky, Jane; With, Kimberly A.; Baughman, Syndallas; Cabin, Robert J. (November 2001). "The Population Biology of Invasive Species". Annual Review of Ecology and Systematics. 32: 305–332. doi:10.1146/annurev.ecolsys.32.081501.114037. S2CID 27826474.
27. Seastedt, T. R.; Gregory, Nathan; Buckner, David (April 2003). "Effect of biocontrol insects on diffuse knapweed (Centaurea diffusa) in a Colorado grassland". Weed Science. 51 (2): 237–245. doi:10.1614/0043-1745(2003)051[0237:EOBIOD]2.0.CO;2. S2CID 34706037.
28. Sheley, Roger L.; Jacobs, James S.; Carpinelli, Michael F. (2017-06-12). "Distribution, Biology, and Management of Diffuse Knapweed (Centaurea diffusa) and Spotted Knapweed (Centaurea maculosa)". Weed Technology. 12 (2): 353–362. doi:10.1017/S0890037X00043931. S2CID 85850618.
29. Thompson, D. J.; Stout, D. G. (1991). "Duration of the juvenile period in diffuse knapweed (Centaurea diffusa)". Canadian Journal of Botany. 69 (2): 368–371. doi:10.1139/b91-050.
30. Vilà, Montserrat; Weiner, Jacob (May 2004). "Are invasive plant species better competitors than native plant species? – evidence from pair‐wise experiments". Oikos. 105 (2): 229–238. doi:10.1111/j.0030-1299.2004.12682.x.
31. Vivanco, Jorge M.; Bais, Harsh P.; Stermitz, Frank R.; Thelen, Giles C.; Callaway, Ragan M. (April 2004). "Biogeographical variation in community response to root allelochemistry: novel weapons and exotic invasion". Ecology Letters. 7 (4): 285–292. doi:10.1111/j.1461-0248.2004.00576.x.
32. Weston, Leslie A.; Duke, Stephen O. (2003). "Weed and Crop Allelopathy". Critical Reviews in Plant Sciences. 22 (3–4): 367–389. doi:10.1080/713610861. S2CID 84429018.
33. Willis, Anthony J.; Thomas, Matthew B.; Lawton, John H. (September 1999). "Is the increased vigour of invasive weeds explained by a trade-off between growth and herbivore resistance?". Oecologia. 120 (4): 632–640. Bibcode:1999Oecol.120..632W. doi:10.1007/s004420050899. PMID 28308315. S2CID 26101345.
34. Wilson, Rob; Beck, K. George; Westra, Philip (June 2004). "Combined effects of herbicides and Sphenoptera jugoslavica on diffuse knapweed (Centaurea diffusa) population dynamics". Weed Science. 52 (3): 418–423. doi:10.1614/P2001-061. S2CID 84341891.
35. Whaley, Dale K.; Piper, Gary L. (June 2002). "Defusing Diffuse Knapweed - Biological Control of an Explosive Weed". Agrichem. Environ. News (194).
