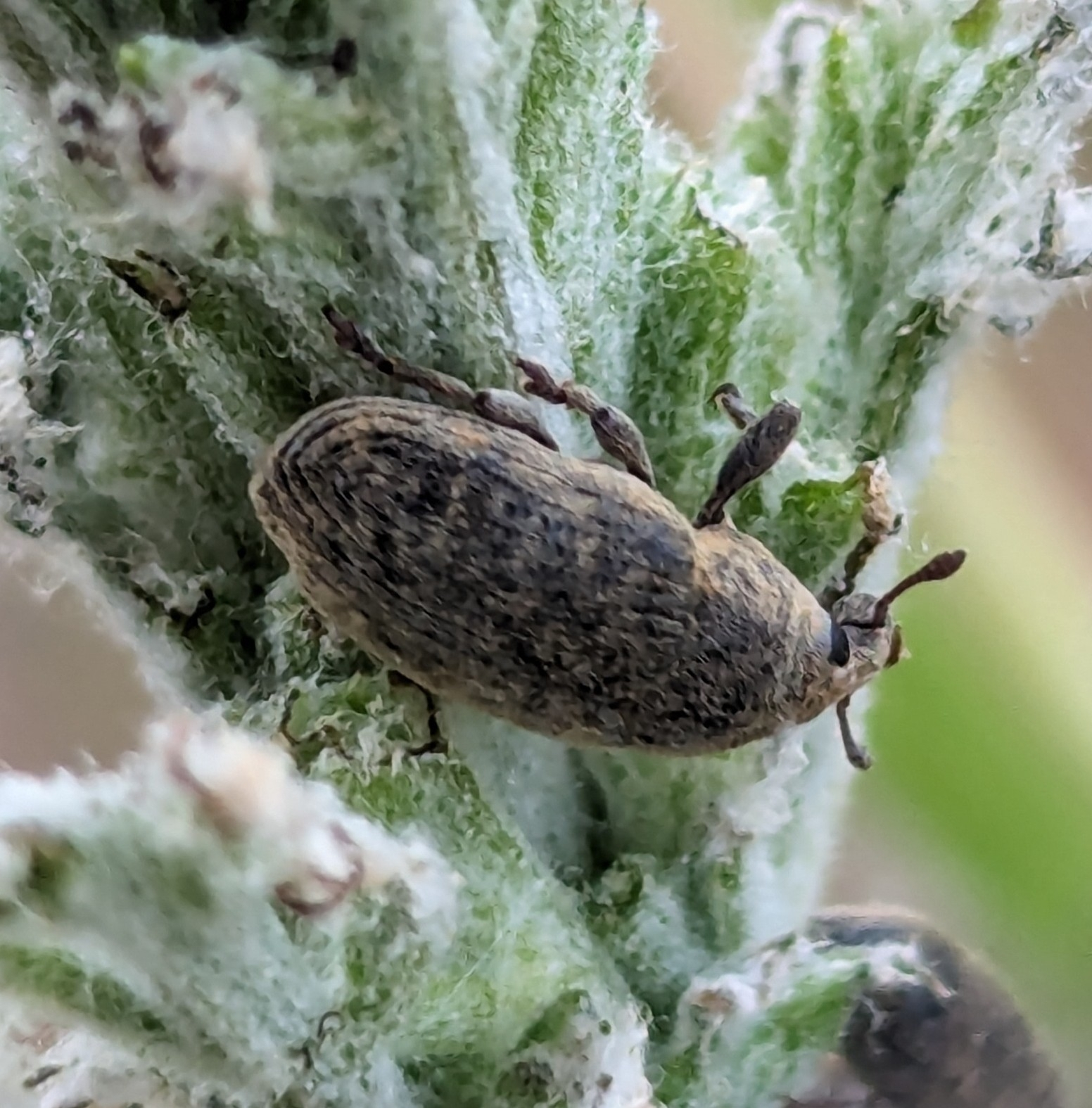

Scientific classification
- Kingdom: Animalia
- Phylum: Arthropoda
- Clade: Pancrustacea
- Class: Insecta
- Order: Coleoptera
- Suborder: Polyphaga
- Infraorder: Cucujiformia
- Superfamily: Curculionoidea
- Family: Curculionidae
- Genus: Larinus
- Subgenus: Larinomesius
- Species: L. minutus

Binomial name
- Larinus minutus Gyllenhal 1835

= Larinus minutus =

Species of beetle

Larinus minutus is a species of true weevil known as the lesser knapweed flower weevil. It is used as an agent of biological pest control against noxious knapweeds, especially diffuse knapweed (Centaurea diffusa) and spotted knapweed.

The adult weevil is dark mottled brown with a long snout. It is 4 or 5 millimetres (0.16 or 0.20 in) long in total. It is active throughout the summer with a 14-week maximum adult lifespan. During this time the female lays up to 130 eggs, depositing them in the knapweed flower head. The larva emerges and burrows into the flower head where it feeds on the developing seeds. The larva damages the plant by reducing seed production (all of the seeds of diffuse knapweed and 25–100% of spotted knapweed) and the adult does damage by defoliating the plant as it feeds on the leaves prior to flowering. After flowering, adult weevils switch to feeding on flowers.

In spotted and diffuse knapweed, L. minutus directly consumes another biological control agent released to control the species, the gall-forming flies Urophora affinis Frfld and Urophora quadrifasciata Meigen (Diptera: Tephrididae).

This weevil is native to southern Europe and the Mediterranean. It was first released as a knapweed biocontrol in the United States in 1991 from Greece. It is now established in knapweed populations throughout the western United States, especially in warm, dry areas. It feeds on knapweeds, preferring diffuse knapweed over others, and it has not been shown to attack native flora. This weevil has been shown to reduce diffuse knapweed density at several sites. It has been less successful in controlling spotted knapweed.
