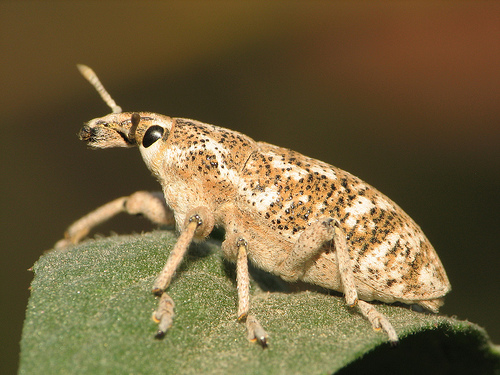
- Cyphocleonus achates

Scientific classification
- Kingdom: Animalia
- Phylum: Arthropoda
- Class: Insecta
- Order: Coleoptera
- Suborder: Polyphaga
- Infraorder: Cucujiformia
- Family: Curculionidae
- Subfamily: Lixinae
- Tribe: Cleonini
- Genus: Cyphocleonus; Motschulsky, 1860

Species
- See text

= Cyphocleonus =

Genus of beetles

Cyphocleonus is a genus of true weevil.

== Species ==
- Cyphocleonus achates
- Cyphocleonus adumbratus
- Cyphocleonus armitagei
- Cyphocleonus cenchrus
- Cyphocleonus dealbatus
- Cyphocleonus hedenborgi
- Cyphocleonus sparsus
- Cyphocleonus sventeniusi
- Cyphocleonus trisulcatus
