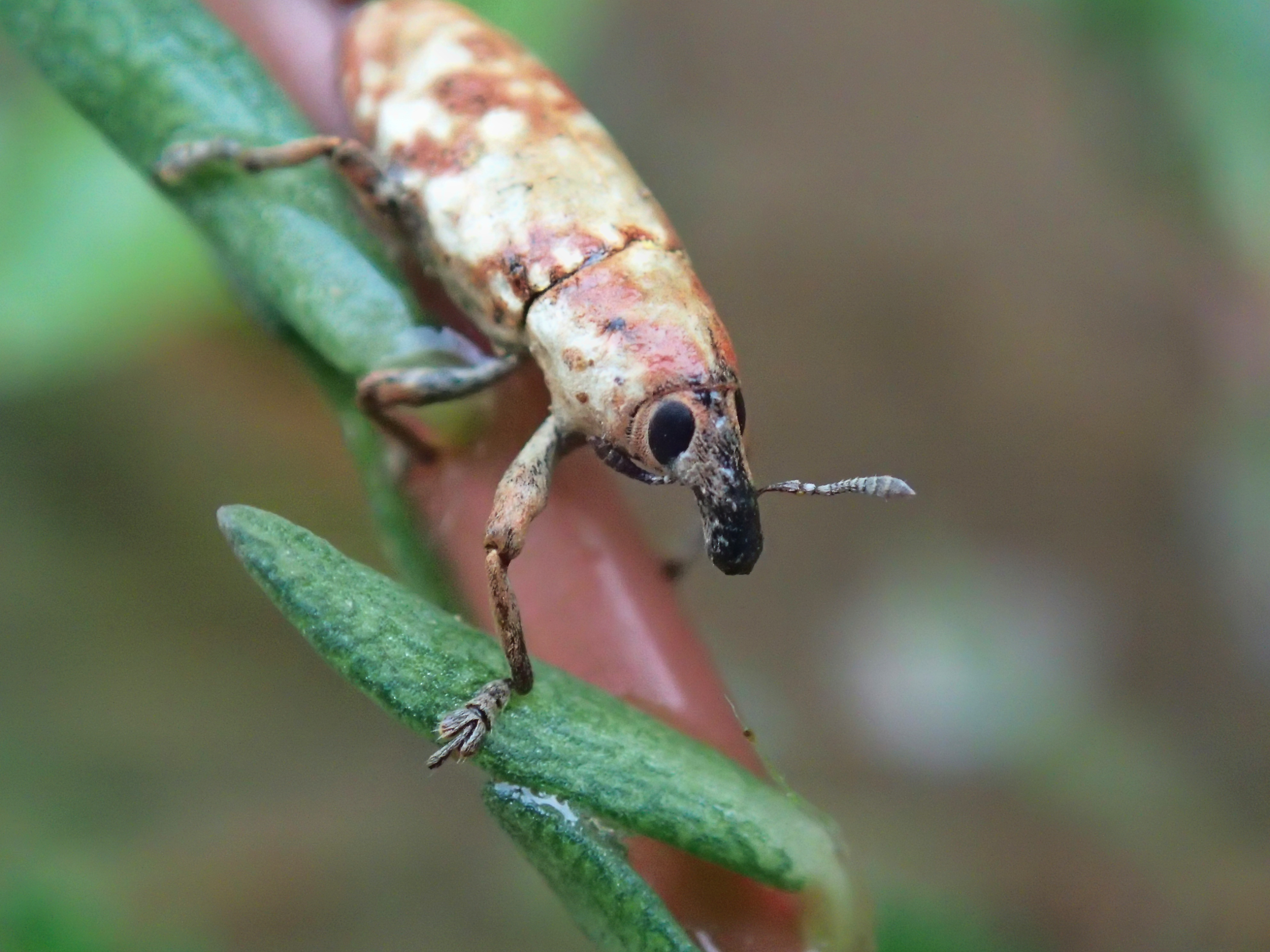

Scientific classification
- Kingdom: Animalia
- Phylum: Arthropoda
- Clade: Pancrustacea
- Class: Insecta
- Order: Coleoptera
- Suborder: Polyphaga
- Infraorder: Cucujiformia
- Superfamily: Curculionoidea
- Family: Curculionidae
- Genus: Cyphocleonus
- Species: C. achates

Binomial name
- Cyphocleonus achates Fahraeus

= Cyphocleonus achates =

Species of beetle

Cyphocleonus achates is a species of true weevil known as the knapweed root weevil. It is native to southern Europe and the Mediterranean and is used as an agent of biological pest control against noxious knapweeds, especially spotted knapweed (Centaurea maculosa). It has recently been spotted in India.

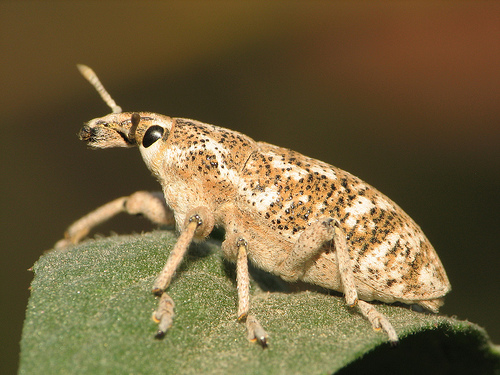
Cyphocleonus achates "knapweed root weevil".

== Life history ==
The adult weevil is dark gray and white speckled and 14 to 15 millimeters long. The female lays about 100 eggs during her 8- to 15-week adult lifespan. The eggs are deposited one by one in notches the female digs into the root crown of the knapweed. The larva emerges from the egg and tunnels into the root cortex where it feeds on the plant tissue. Sometimes a gall is produced in the feeding area. Adults feed on the leaves but it is the larva that does the most damage to the plant. Small plants can be killed by the larva's destruction of the root tissue. In their native range, most C. achates overwinter as 2nd instars, though in the introduced range, the vast majority overwinter as 1st instars.

== Biocontrol in North America ==
It was first released as a knapweed biocontrol in the 1980s in the United States. It is established in much of the western United States and there is evidence that it reduces knapweed biomass. C. achates is thought to be responsible for a recent (2000s) observed decline in spotted knapweed, but this decline may also be attributable to a recent severe drought. The weevil prefers spotted knapweed, but it is sometimes found on diffuse knapweed. It has not been shown to attack native flora.

Cyphocleonus achates was released to the Hiawatha National Forest in Michigan's Upper Peninsula in summer 2009.
