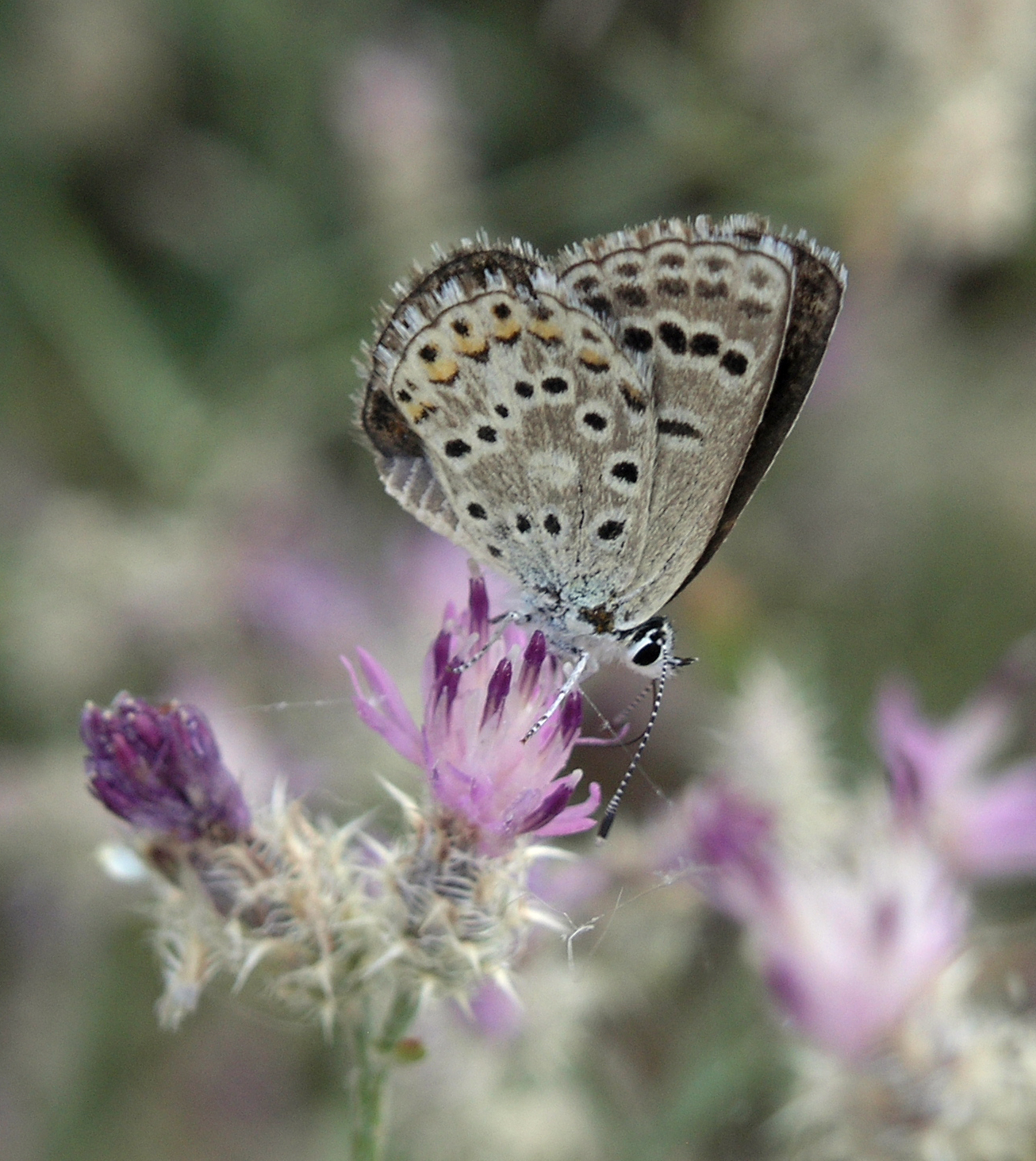
- Centaurea virgata subsp. squarrosa with a Alpherakya sarta

Scientific classification
- Kingdom: Plantae
- Clade: Tracheophytes
- Clade: Angiosperms
- Clade: Eudicots
- Clade: Asterids
- Order: Asterales
- Family: Asteraceae
- Genus: Centaurea
- Species: C. virgata

Binomial name
- Centaurea virgata Lam.

Synonyms
- Centaurea squarrosa Willd.

= Centaurea virgata =

Species of plant

Centaurea virgata is a species of Centaurea. It is native to Western Asia. The subspecies C. virgata subsp. squarrosa is known as squarrose knapweed.

== Distribution ==
The species is native to Asia, commonly found in Western and Middle Asia, the Caucasus region and China (Xinjiang). Additionally, it has been introduced in North America, particularly in northern California, Idaho, Utah and eastern Oregon. Similarly, its occurrence has been reported in France and countries near the Dalmatian Coast.

== Description ==
The plants are taprooted perennials and may reach a height of 36 inches. Flowers are formed in a slender urn-shaped head (4 to 8 flowers per head). Heads are slightly curved downward and resemble diffuse knapweed (Centaurea diffusa Lam.) on a diet but with rose-purple flowers. The head is made of a cluster of bracts and the tip of the bract is bent out. Seeds are pale brown and may disperse 60 feet when not spread by animals. The bent bract often allows the head to catch a ride on passing animals and is considered the mechanism for long distant dispersal. Older plants may have multiple rosettes on top of the long taproot. The taproot allows this weed to thrive in dry sites so it may be more invasive than diffuse knapweed in severely dry rangelands.
