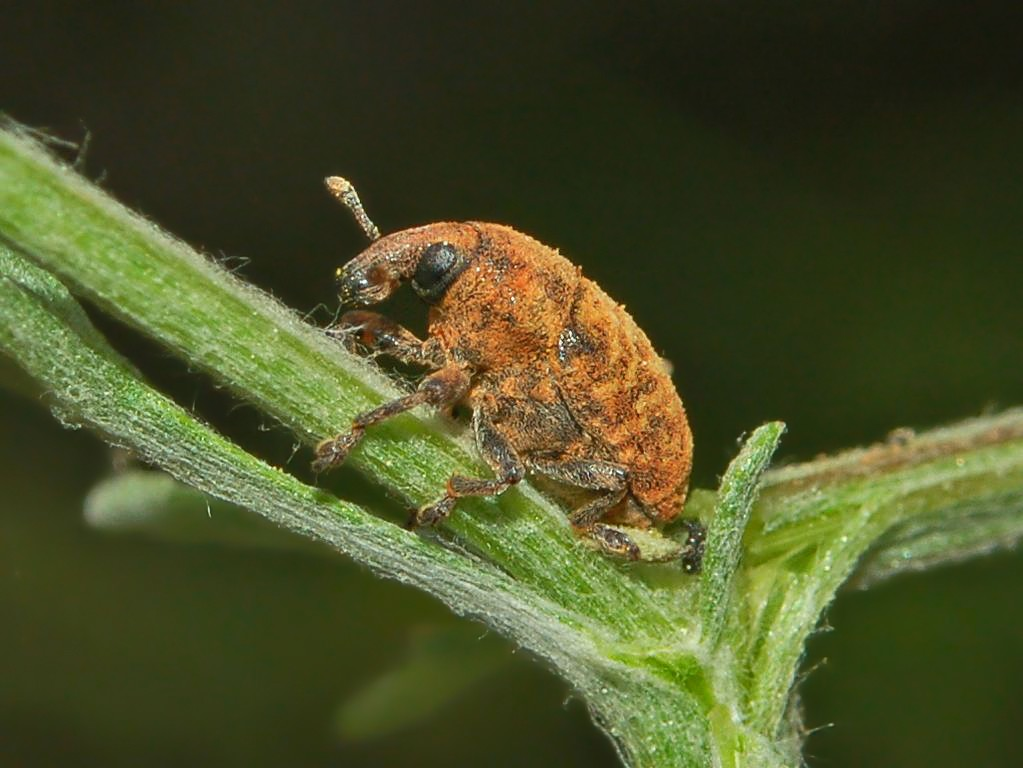

Scientific classification
- Kingdom: Animalia
- Phylum: Arthropoda
- Clade: Pancrustacea
- Class: Insecta
- Order: Coleoptera
- Suborder: Polyphaga
- Infraorder: Cucujiformia
- Superfamily: Curculionoidea
- Family: Curculionidae
- Genus: Larinus
- Species: L. obtusus

Binomial name
- Larinus obtusus Gyllenhal, 1836

= Larinus obtusus =

Blunt knapweed flower weevil

Species of beetle

Larinus obtusus is a species of true weevil known as the blunt knapweed flower weevil. It is used as an agent of biological pest control against noxious knapweeds, especially spotted knapweed (Centaurea maculosa).

The adult weevil is dark brown with a large, bulbous snout. It is 5 to 7 millimeters (0.19 to 0.27 inches) long in total. It is active throughout the summer when the female lays yellow eggs in the opened flower head. The larva emerges and feeds on the developing seeds inside the head. The larval stage lasts 17 days, after which the larva constructs a cocoon from the remnants of the seeds and pupates within it for about nine days. Most of the damage to the plant is done by the larva's feeding on the seeds; the adult feeds on the foliage but does less drastic damage to the plant. The average lifespan of the weevil is around 94 days for males and 58 for females.

This weevil is native to Europe and the Middle East. It was first introduced to the United States for the biocontrol of knapweeds in the Boulder, Colorado area in 1991. It is now established in much of the northwestern United States, but its abundance is unknown. This weevil is quite similar to its relative, Larinus minutus, which is also a knapweed specialist used for biocontrol. They are currently considered separate species but this could change with further research.
