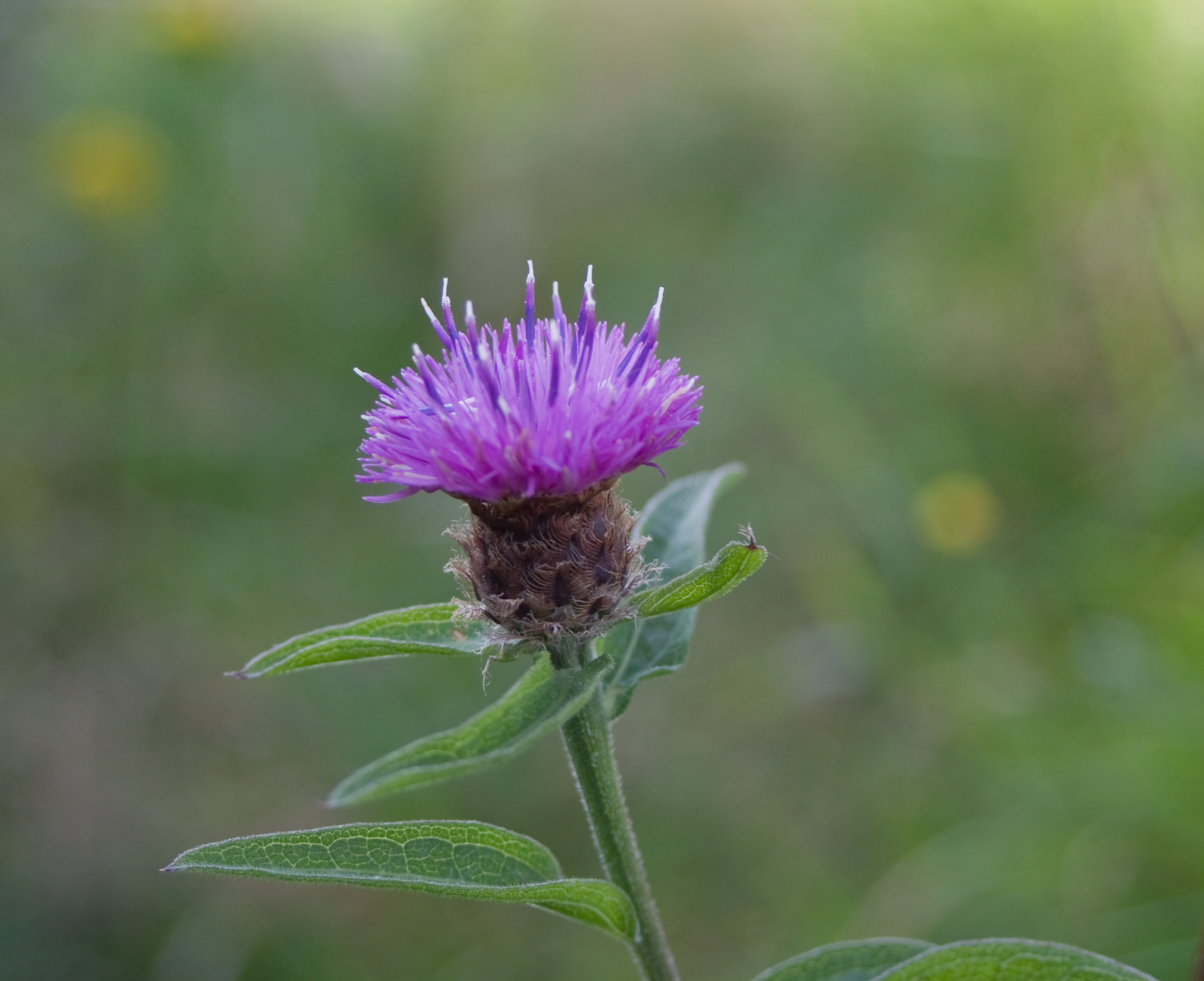

Scientific classification
- Kingdom: Plantae
- Clade: Embryophytes
- Clade: Tracheophytes
- Clade: Spermatophytes
- Clade: Angiosperms
- Clade: Eudicots
- Clade: Asterids
- Order: Asterales
- Family: Asteraceae
- Genus: Centaurea
- Species: C. nigra

Binomial name
- Centaurea nigra L.

= Centaurea nigra =

Species of flowering plant in the daisy family

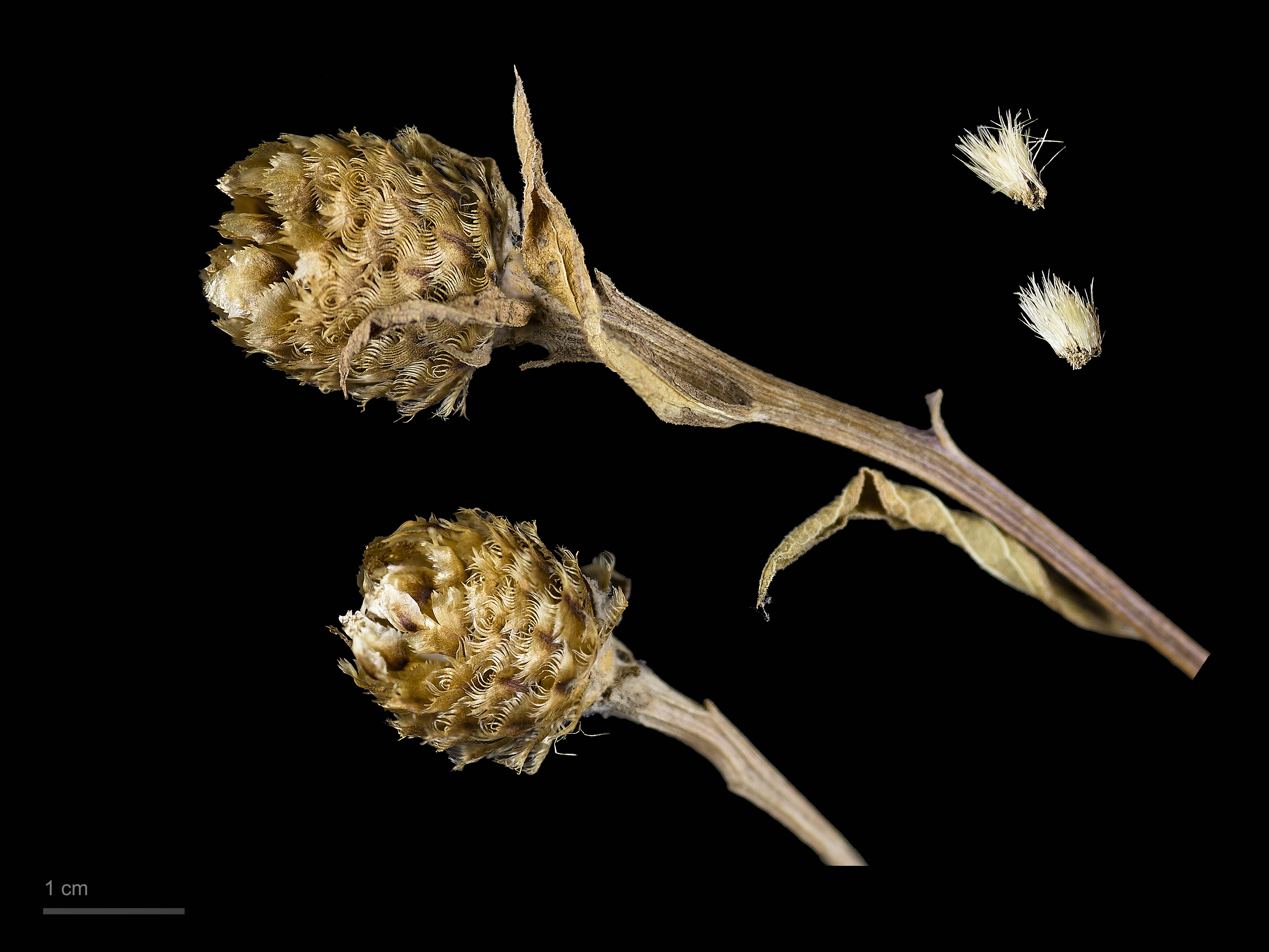
Dried flower heads of Centaurea nigra – MHNT

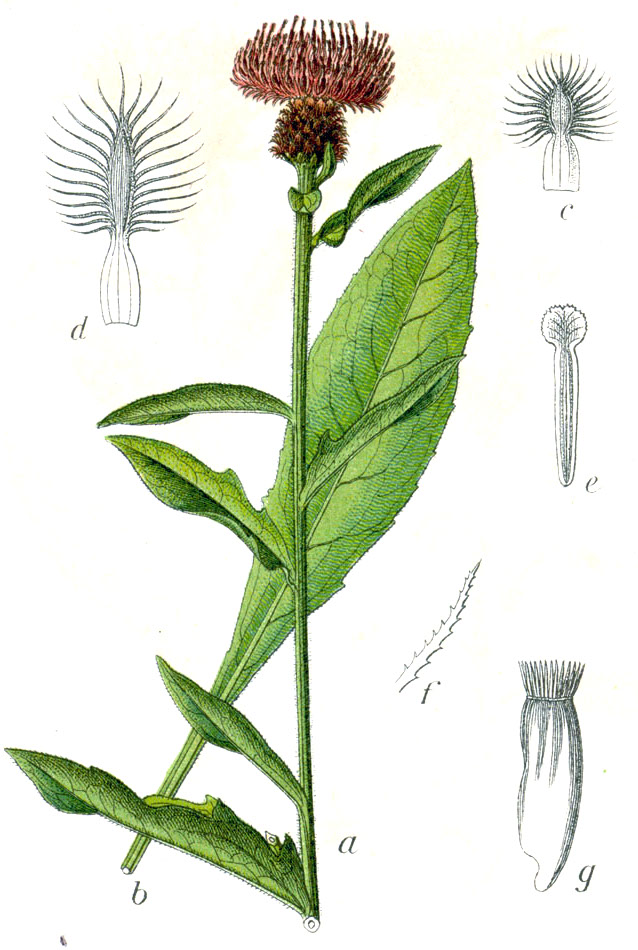
Illustration

Centaurea nigra is a species of flowering plant in the family Asteraceae, and is also known as lesser knapweed, common knapweed, black knapweed and bell weed.

It is native to central Europe, and has been introduced to temperate North America and Australasia, where it is usually regarded as a noxious weed due to its fast spread, hardiness and competitive potential.

== Description ==
Centaurea nigra is an upright herbaceous perennial growing up to c. 1 m (3.3 ft) in height. It produces spreading rhizomes.

C. nigra initially produces a basal rosette of leaves, which are usually entire and up to 30 cm long (11.8 in). Once the rosette is fully formed, it produces upright stems before eventually dying away. These upright stems turn purple when mature. The leaves on these stems are smaller, 1–8 mm x 2–10 mm, usually entire, grey-green and roughly hairy.

The inflorescence is globe-shaped, 10–20 mm x 30–40 mm, and contains small purple to reddish flowers that are fringed by black or dark brown bracts.

The fruit (seeds) are a light brown flattened ovoid 3–4 mm long, topped with short bristles c. 1 mm. In its native range, flowering occurs in summer to autumn from June-July until September.

== Ecology ==
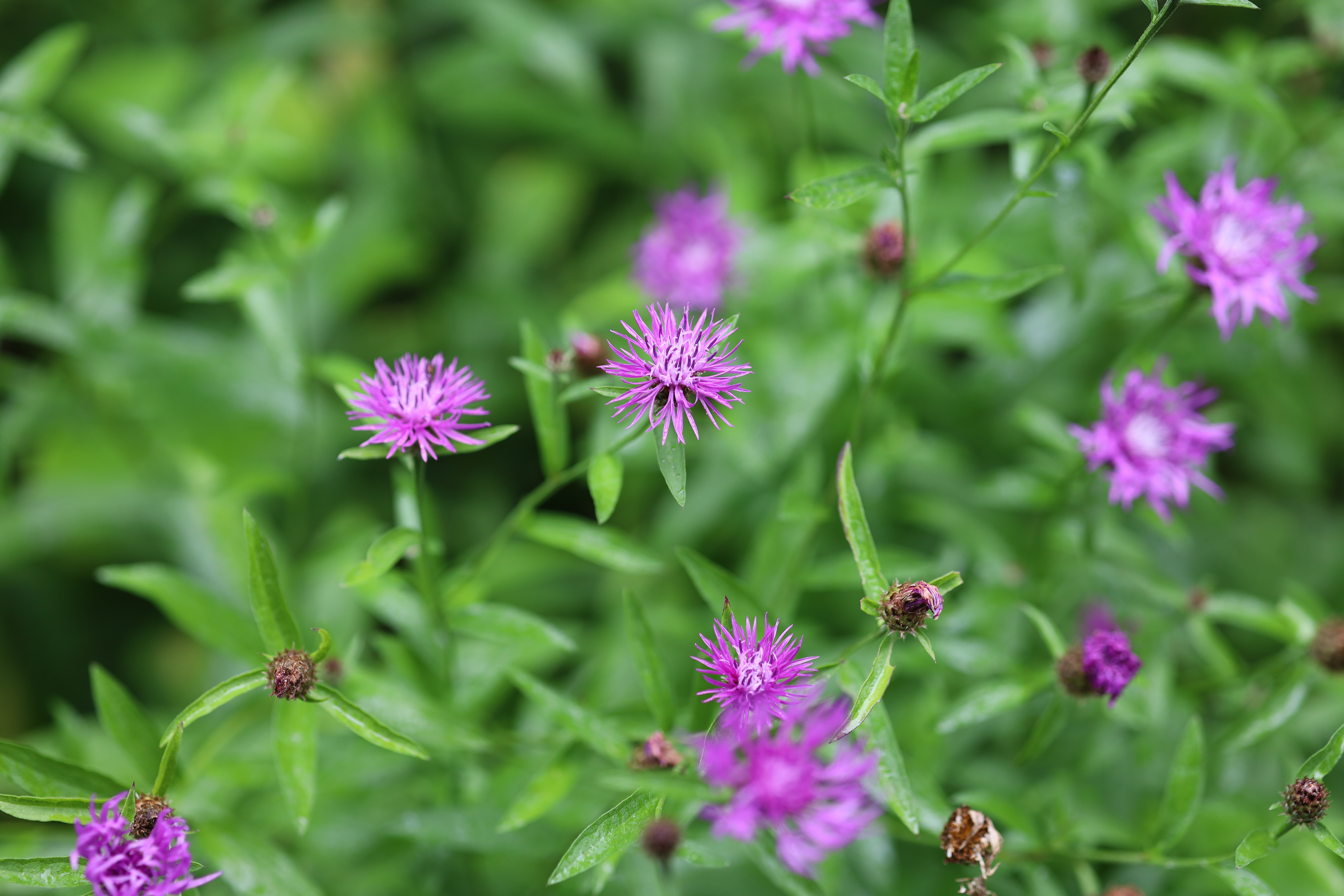
Deschambault-Grondines, Quebec, Canada

Centaurea nigra boasts high nectar and pollen production relative to other British perennial meadow flowers. Nectar, pollen and seeds are highly important food resources to many species of invertebrates and birds. In its native range, C. nigra can therefore greatly improve biodiversity values and ecosystem services, such as pollination, when planted with a variety of other forbs, for example on field margins.

In its introduced range, C. nigra is often considered a weed because it excludes native vegetation and can reduce agricultural potential. In the United States, it invades meadows where it excludes native vegetation, thereby impacting native biodiversity. In Australia and New Zealand, C. nigra is known to invade grasslands, wastelands (e.g. railway lines, roadsides, waste areas) and agricultural lands.

== Similar species ==
Black knapweed is similar to brown knapweed (Centaurea jacea), spotted knapweed (C. stoebe) and greater knapweed (C. scabiosa). It is also relatively similar to creeping knapweed (Rhaponticum repens) and star thistle (Centaurea calcitrapa). Centaurea × moncktonii, is a fertile hybrid between black knapweed and brown knapweed.
