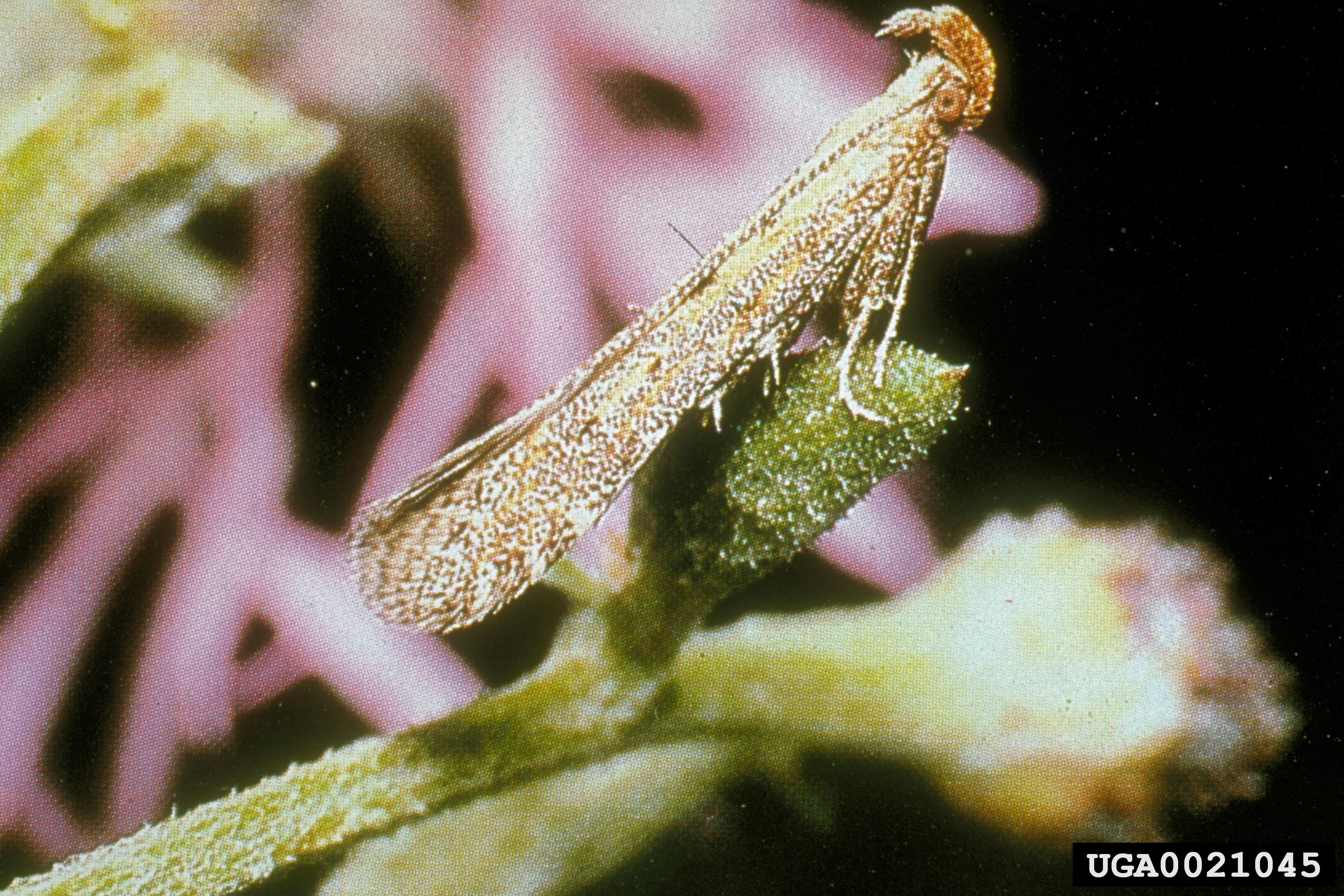

Scientific classification
- Kingdom: Animalia
- Phylum: Arthropoda
- Clade: Pancrustacea
- Class: Insecta
- Order: Lepidoptera
- Family: Gelechiidae
- Genus: Metzneria
- Species: M. paucipunctella

Binomial name
- Metzneria paucipunctella (Zeller, 1839)

Synonyms
- Gelechia (Metzneria) paucipunctella Zeller, 1839; Metzneria luqueti Nel, 1995; Metzneria zimmermanni Hering, 1941; Metzneria confusalis Lucas, 1956

= Metzneria paucipunctella =

Spotted knapweed seed head moth

Species of moth

Metzneria paucipunctella is a species of moth known as the spotted knapweed seed head moth. It is used as an agent of biological pest control against noxious knapweeds, particularly spotted knapweed (Centaurea maculosa).

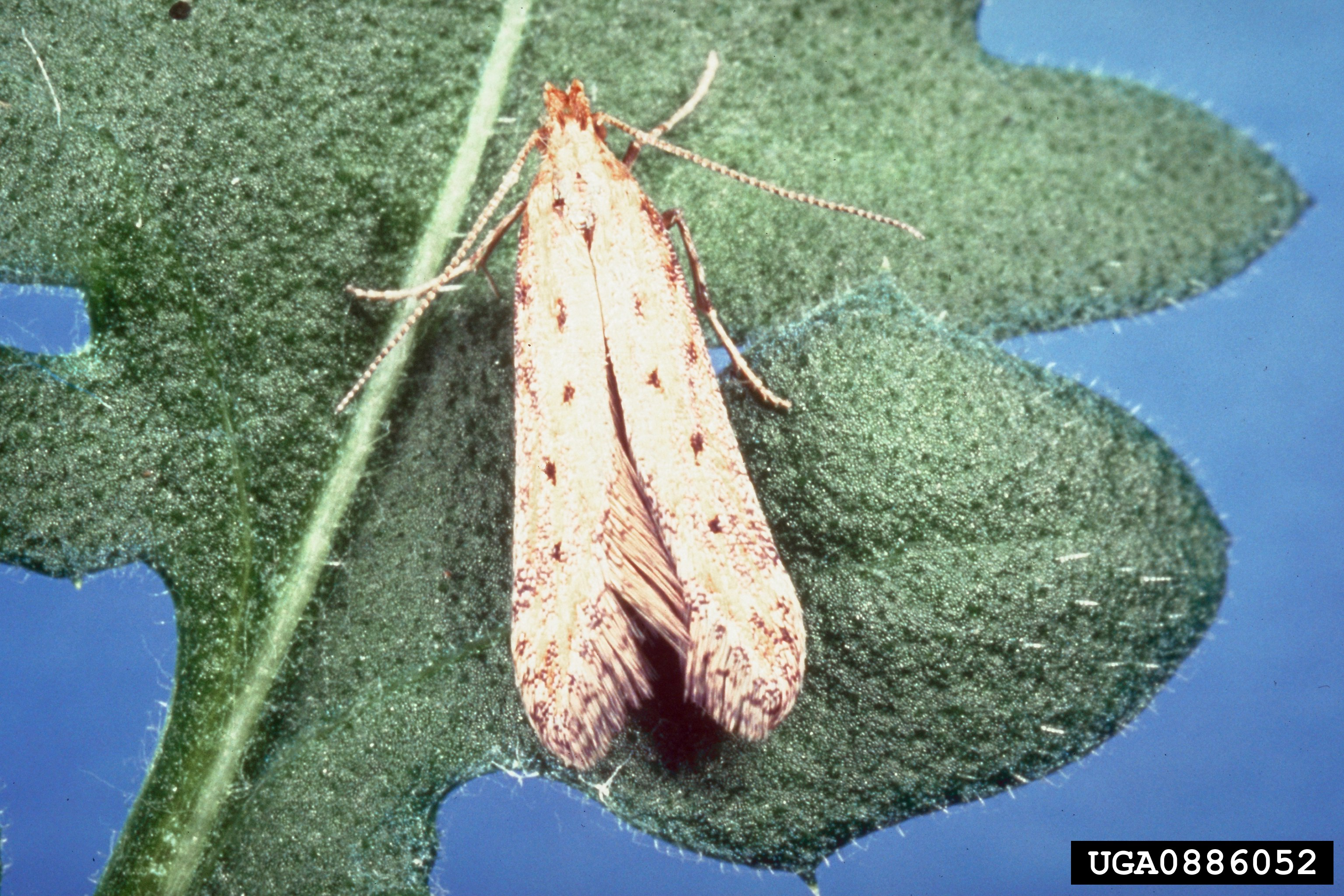

The adult moth is narrow-bodied and about 8 millimeters long. It is brownish-gray and lightly speckled. It has large recurved antennae. The female lays about 80 eggs, depositing each at the base of a flower head. In about ten days the larva emerges and burrows into the flower head where it feeds on the developing seeds and florets. The larva is a small, plump white grub with a dark head and visible body segments. It overwinters inside the seed head and pupates the following spring.

This moth is native to Europe. It was first introduced as a biocontrol agent for knapweeds in the United States in 1980, and it is now established in much of the western United States. The larvae of this moth compete with other head-dwelling biocontrol agents; if they find the larvae of another species they attack and consume them. Nevertheless, knapweed control is better when the moth works in tandem with other insects.
