= Chou Chang-hung =

Taiwanese botanist (born 1942)

Chou Chang-hung (Chinese: 周昌弘; born 5 September 1942) is a Taiwanese botanist and plant ecologist. He has been elected a fellow of The World Academy of Sciences and an academician of Academia Sinica.

== Academic career ==
Chou completed a bachelor's degree and master's degree at National Taiwan University in 1965 and 1968, respectively, in the field of botany. During his doctoral study at the University of California, Santa Barbara, he chose to specialize in plant ecology. Upon completing his Ph.D. in 1971, Chou pursued postdoctoral research at the University of Toronto. He then returned to Taiwan as an associate research fellow affiliated with the Academia Sinica's Institute of Plant and Microbial Biology. Chou was successively promoted to full research fellow in 1976, and served as institute director from 1989 to 1996. Between 1999 and 2002, Chou served as vice president of the National Sun Yat-sen University. He left NSYSU and the IPMB in 2002 to become the president of the National Pingtung University of Science and Technology, and served as NPUST head until 2006. Chou has also headed Academia Sinica's division of life sciences. Chou holds a chair professorship at China Medical University, National Chung Hsing University, and National Sun Yat-sen University, a distinguished chair professorship at National Taiwan University and National Cheng Kung University, and retained a life chair professorship at the National Pingtung University of Science and Technology upon stepping down as university president.

== Environmental views ==
Chou is opposed to building an eighth naphtha cracker in Taiwan, as proposed by the Kuokuang Petrochemical Technology Company (KTPC). Although he served as a member of the environmental impact assessment committee that approved the construction of the sixth naphtha cracker in Mailiao, he later brought up the environmental effects of that project in his opposition to the KPTC proposal. After Chou's National Chung Hsing University colleague Tsuang Ben-jei published research on the environmental effects of the sixth naphtha cracker, and the Formosa Plastics Group sued Tsuang in 2012, Chou supported Tsuang in the interest of academic freedom. In other observations related to the environment, Chou has commented that global warming is leading to the migration of some plant species.

== Political views ==
In January 2019, Chou co-signed a petition asking the Executive Yuan to revoke the Ministry of Education's decision approving Kuan Chung-ming's election as National Taiwan University president. In 2023, he drew attention to the ways Chinese companies were permitted to access genetic data collected from Taiwanese people, drawing comparisons to Chinese acquisitions of Taiwanese pineapple seedlings and associated genomic data. During the 2024 presidential election cycle, Chou expressed support for the Democratic Progressive Party ticket of Lai Ching-te and Hsiao Bi-khim.

== Honors and awards ==
Chou was elected a fellow of The World Academy of Sciences in 1993, and to academician status within Academia Sinica in 1994.
