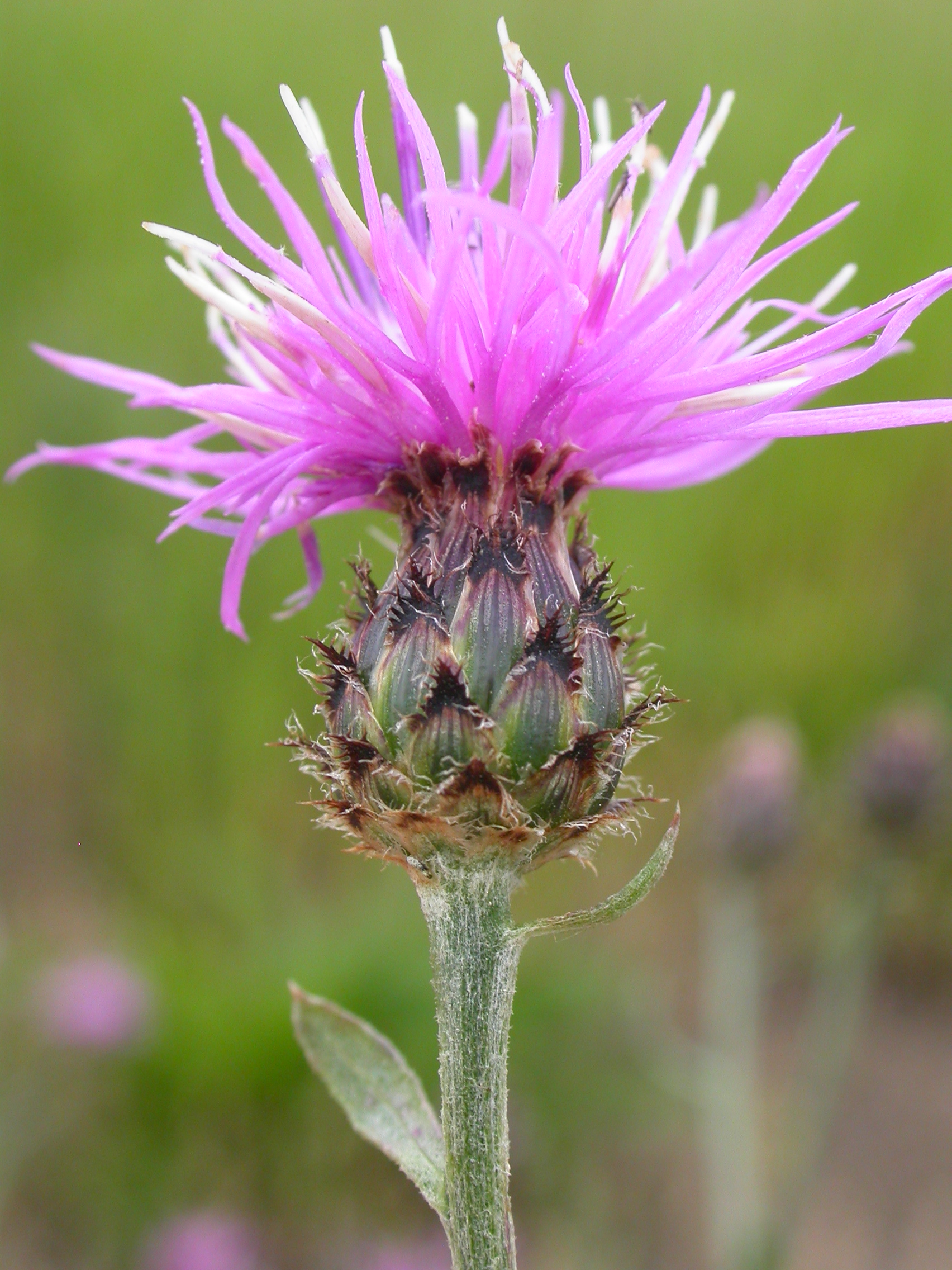

Scientific classification
- Kingdom: Plantae
- Clade: Embryophytes
- Clade: Tracheophytes
- Clade: Spermatophytes
- Clade: Angiosperms
- Clade: Eudicots
- Clade: Asterids
- Order: Asterales
- Family: Asteraceae
- Genus: Centaurea
- Species: C. stoebe

Binomial name
- Centaurea stoebe L.

= Centaurea stoebe =

Spotted knapweed

Species of flowering plant

Centaurea stoebe, the spotted knapweed or panicled knapweed, is a species of Centaurea native to eastern Europe, although it has spread to North America, where it is considered an invasive species. It forms a tumbleweed, helping to increase the species' reach, and the seeds are also enabled by a feathery pappus.

== Description ==
Centaurea stoebe is a biennial or short-lived perennial plant, and it usually has a stout taproot and pubescent stems when young. It has pale and deeply-lobed leaves covered in fine short hairs. First-year plants produce a basal rosette, alternate, up to 15 centimetres (6 inches) long, deeply divided into lobes. It produces a stem in its second year of growth. Stem leaves are progressively less lobed, getting smaller toward the top. The stem is erect or ascending, slender, hairy and branching, and can grow up to 0.91 metres (3 feet) tall. Protruding from black-tipped sepals, the flower blooms from July to September. The flower head is 10 millimetres (3/8 in) wide, with vibrant pink to lavender (or more rarely white) disc flowers around 2 cm (3/4 in) long; the corolla of each has five narrow lobes. The fruit is an achene about 6.4 mm (1/4 in) long with a short, bristly pappus. These are primarily dispersed by wind, sometimes assisted by the plant's tumbleweed mode.

== Taxonomy ==
C. stoebe was formerly known as C. maculosa. Two cytotypes of C. stoebe exist which have been considered as different species by some taxonomists. The diploid form of the plant is now called C. stoebe L. spp. stoebe, while the tetraploid is known as C. stoebe L. spp. micranthos or by some taxonomists as C. biebersteinii DC. The names of C. stoebe and C. biebersteinii may have been accidentally switched early in the plant's taxonomic history.

The common name spotted knapweed refers to the black-tipped sepals that look like spots.

== Distribution and habitat ==
The species is native to eastern Europe. It is also an invasive species in southern Canada, and northwestern Mexico, and nearly every state in the United States; it has thrived in the western US in particular, much of which has a dry climate similar to the Mediterranean.

The plant grows on stream banks, pond shorelines, sand prairies, old fields and pastures, roadsides, along railroads, and in many open and disturbed areas. It is relatively tolerant of cold and reaches into alpine environments.

== Ecology ==
Centaurea stoebe has been introduced to North America, where it is considered an invasive species in much of the western US and Canada. In 2000, C. stoebe occupied more than 7 million acres (28,000 square kilometres) in the US.

Spotted knapweed is a pioneer species found in recently disturbed sites or openings, growing in dense stands. As such, human disturbance is a major cause of infestations. It readily establishes itself and quickly expands in places of human disturbance such as industrial sites, along roadsides, and along sandy riverbanks. Once established, it also has the potential to spread into undisturbed natural areas. Because cattle prefer the native bunchgrass over knapweed, overgrazing can often increase the density and range of knapweed infestations. This species is believed to have several traits that contribute to its extreme competitive ability:

1. A tap root that sucks up water faster than the root systems of its neighbors.
2. Rapid dispersal through high seed production.
3. Low palatability, making it less likely to be eaten.
4. Its purported allelopathy allows it to thrive by stunting the growth of neighboring plants.

A study conducted in 2003 has shown that with future global atmospheric carbon levels, C. stoebe shows increased growth with increased atmospheric carbon which could potentially expand its range and outcompete native species.

=== History in North America ===
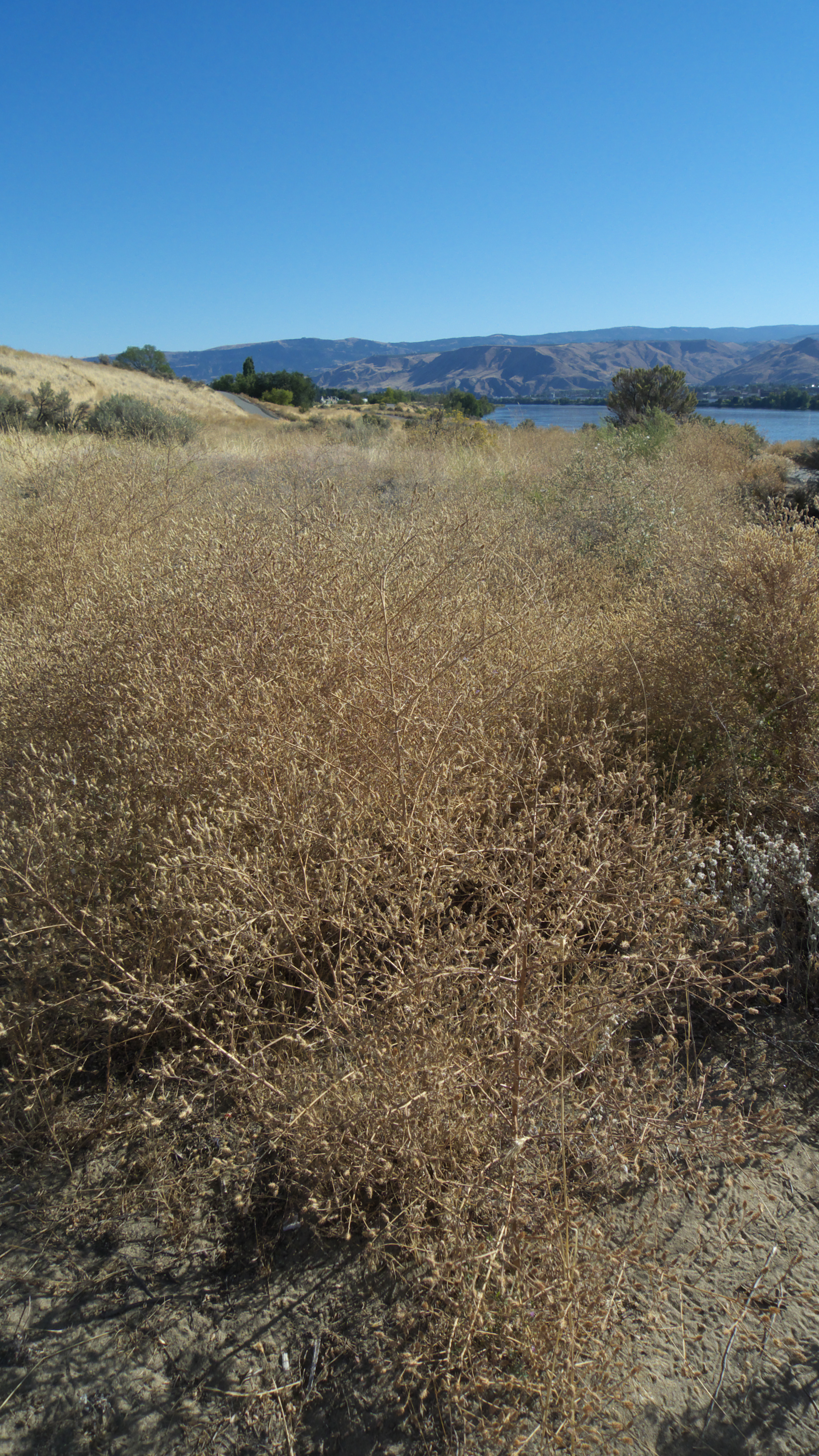
C. stoebe subsp. micranthos in East Wenatchee, Douglas County, Washington

Spotted knapweed likely spread to North America in an alfalfa shipment. It was first recorded in Bingen, Klickitat County, Washington, in the late 1800s. By 1980, it had spread to 26 counties in the Pacific Northwest. In the year 2000, it was reported in 45 of the 50 states of the US. It primarily affects rangelands of the northwest US and Canada. A 1996 study estimated its direct and secondary economic effects in Montana to be approximately $42 million annually. When it replaces native grasses, soil erosion and surface runoff are increased, depleting precious soil resources.

In 2015, a Missoula, Montana, beekeeper whose bees rely on local knapweed stated that "knapweed produces great honey ... people should consider planting native wildflowers instead of just taking out weeds."

=== Catechin controversy ===
The roots of Centaurea stoebe exude (-)-catechin, which has been proposed to function as a natural herbicide that may inhibit competition by a wide range of other plant species. While this phytotoxic compound can inhibit seed germination and growth at high concentrations, it is debated whether concentrations in field soils are high enough to affect competition with neighboring plants. Several high-profile papers arguing for the importance of catechin as an allelochemical were retracted after it was found that they contained fabricated data showing unnaturally high levels of catechin in soils surrounding C. stoebe. Subsequent studies from the original lab have not been able to replicate the results from these retracted studies, nor have most independent studies conducted in other laboratories. Thus, it is doubtful whether the levels of (-)-catechin found in soils are high enough to affect competition with neighboring plants. The proposed mechanism of action (acidification of the cytoplasm through oxidative damage) has also been criticized, on the basis that (-)-catechin is actually an antioxidant.

=== Control ===
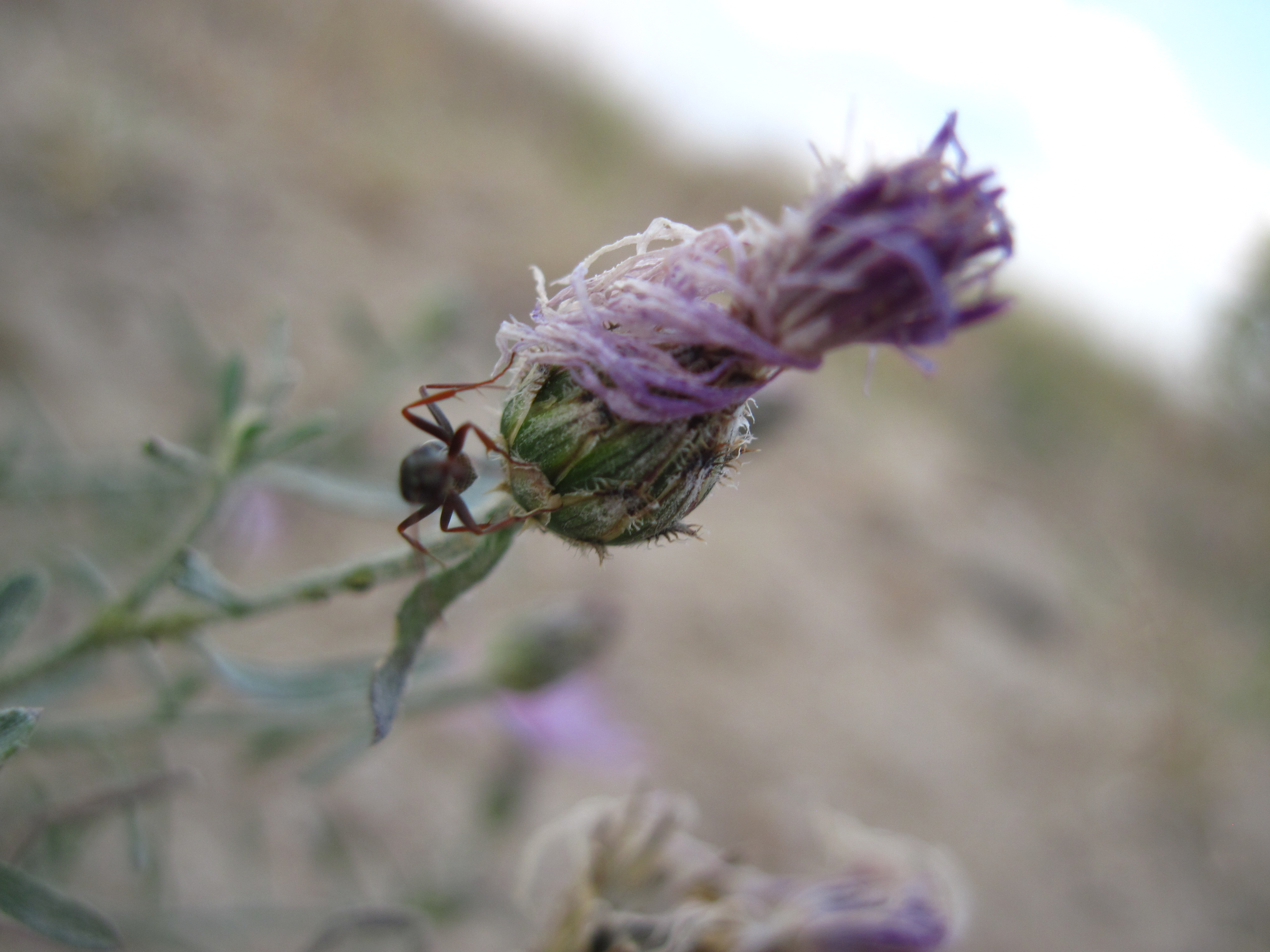
Centaurea stoebe

An 8-year study in Michigan found that restoring native plant communities in knapweed-infested sites requires multi-faceted and multi-year approaches. This includes an initial site preparation by mowing and an optional application of a clopyralid or glyphosate herbicide followed by reseeding with the desired plant communities. Yearly hand-pulling of C. stoebe over the course of the study virtually eradicated the infestation. Burning treatments of infested sites reduced the labour needs for pulling and encouraged native plant community establishment.

Another study over 3 years comparing the effectiveness of different combinations of annual spring, summer, and fall mowing treatments recommends an annual fall mowing during the flowering or seed-production stage in controlling C. stoebe infestations.

==== Biocontrol ====
Thirteen biological pest control agents have been used against this plant and its congener, diffuse knapweed (C. diffusa), including the moths, Agapeta zoegana and Metzneria paucipunctella; the weevils, Bangasternus fausti, Larinus obtusus, Larinus minutus and Cyphocleonus achates; and the fruit flies, Chaetorellia acrolophi, Urophora affinis and Urophora quadrifasciata. Although the number of seeds is significantly reduced, this is not enough to make biocontrol truly effective against C. stoebe. In some instances, root-herbivory on C. stoebe stimulates additional release of catechin, which may function as an allelopathic toxin. In addition, moderate levels of herbivory by biocontrol agents can cause compensatory growth.

==== Prescribed grazing ====
Prescribed grazing may be an effective means of controlling infestations, as all growth forms of C. stoebe are nutritious to sheep. High-density infestations can be controlled by fencing in the affected area with sheep until the desired level of removal is achieved.

==== Detection ====
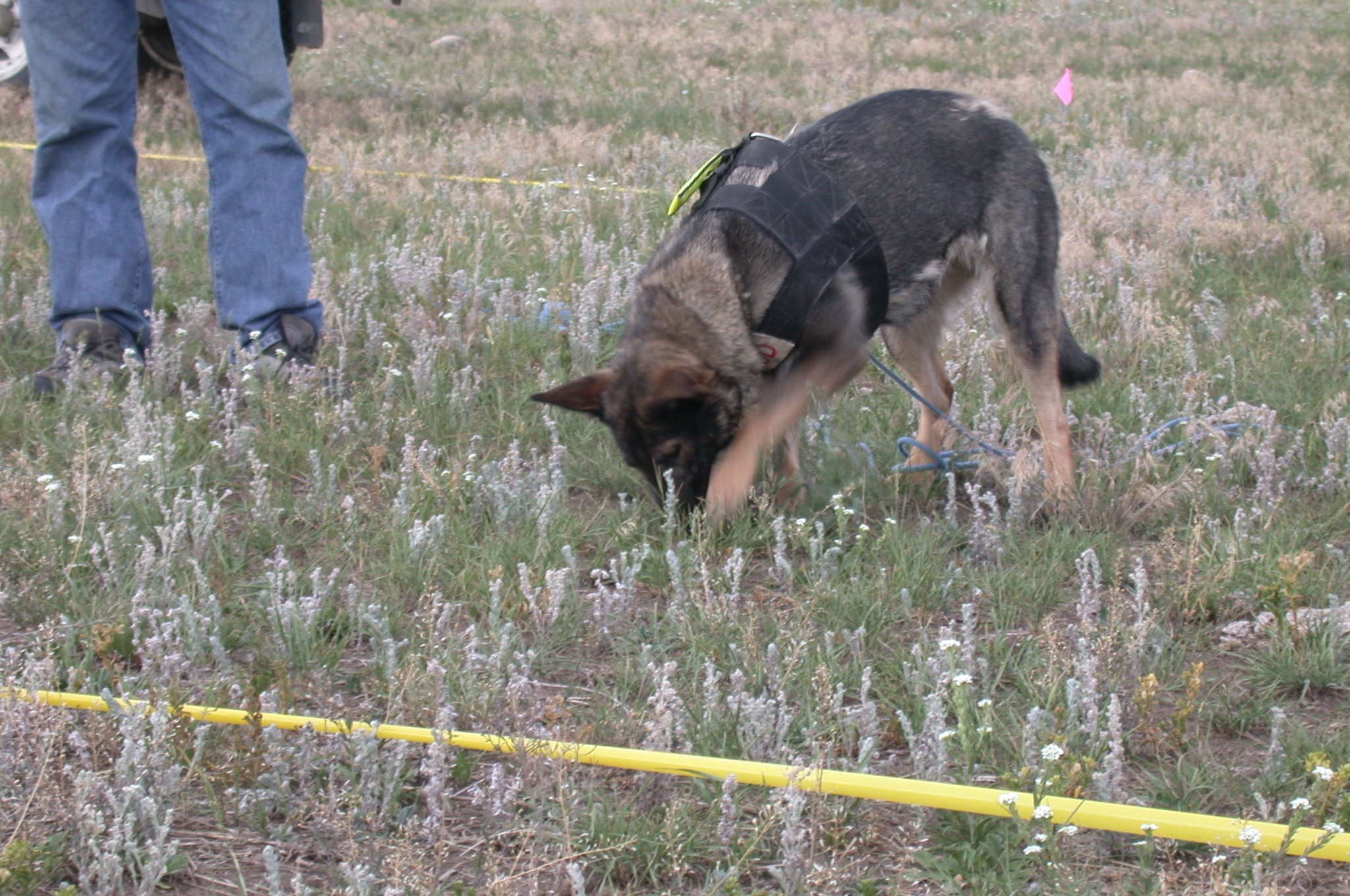
Knapweed Nightmare noxious weed detection dog digging at spotted knapweed plant

Detection dogs can be trained to locate small infestations of invasive, non-native weeds. Previous methods of detection involved lining up dozens of volunteers to locate the small rosettes buried somewhere on a large parcel of land covered with other vegetation.

Montana State University successfully completed field testing in 2004. The dog, Knapweed Nightmare, was finding low densities of the non-native invasive knapweed plant in the field with an overall success rate of 93%. She followed it up with 98% in the final trials in open fields, demonstrating that dogs can effectively detect low densities of invasive plants.

== Toxicity ==
Handling the plant barehanded is rumored to possibly cause tumors, particularly if one has an open wound, but there is little evidence to support this hypothesis.
