= Montserrat Vilà =

Spanish ecologist

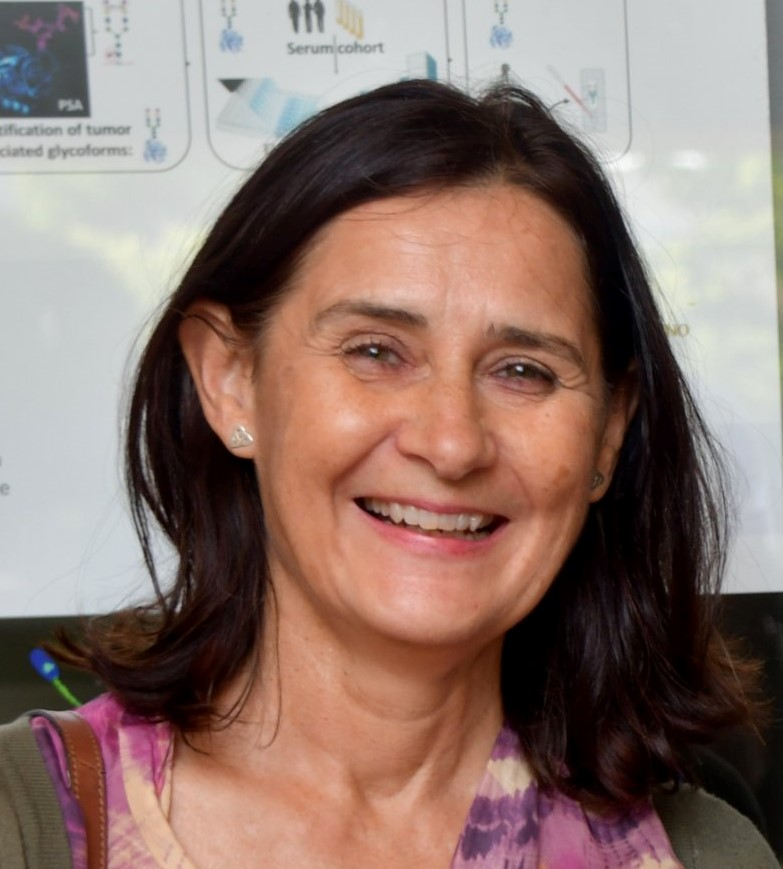
- Born: 1965
- Alma mater: Autonomous University of Barcelona
- Occupation: Biologist; university teacher; scientist
- Awards: prix national de la recherche Alejandro Malaspina (2021); Robert H. Whittaker Distinguished Ecologist Awards (2025); George Mercer Award (2021)
- Website: www.montsevila.org
- Academic career
- Fields: Ecology, biology, biological invasion, biodiversity, nature conservation
- Institutions: Doñana Biological Station (2006–); Spanish National Research Council; University of Seville (2020–)

Montserrat Vilà i Planella (Figueres, 1964) is a Spanish ecologist who primarily studies the biological and environmental factors that determine the presence and success of invasive plants, as well as their ecological and economic impacts.

== Biography ==
Vilà received a bachelor's degree in Sciences (Biology, 1988) from Autonomous University of Barcelona (UAB). She did her doctorate at UAB's Centre de Recerca Ecològica i Aplicacions Forestals (CREAF), under the direction of Dr. Jaume Terradas, and presented the thesis, "Effect of competition in Erica multiflora resprouting, growth and flowering after disturbances", in 1993. Between 1994 and 1996, she worked as a post-doctoral researcher at the University of California, Berkeley. Later, she worked as a research professor associated with CREAF and taught at the University of Barcelona, while maintaining a close link with UC Berkeley.

In 2006, Vilà began working at the Estación Biológica de Doñana, where she has been a research professor since 2010 and deputy director from 2012 to 2015.

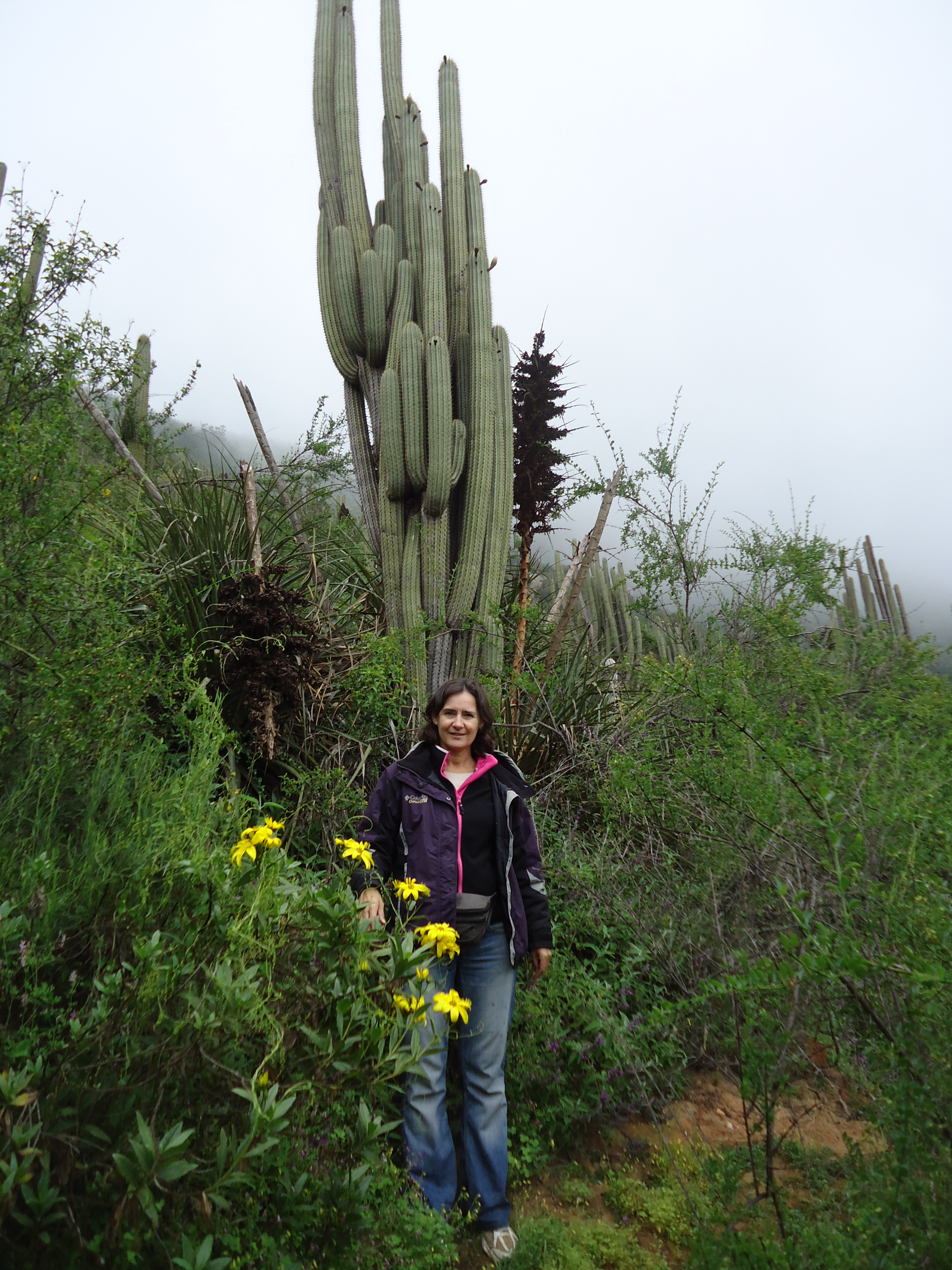
Montserrat Vilà (Chile, 2014)

In 2017 and 2018, she coordinated evaluations and follow-ups in the area of plant, animal, and ecology biology at the State Research Agency. From 2017, she is a member of the scientific committee for flora and fauna of the Ministry of Environment.. She was also part of the IPBES 10 assessment on invasive alien species and their control.

Vilà has published more than 170 scientific articles, co-edited seven books, and has written more than 40 book chapters.[4] In 2014 he was one of the 47 people of Spanish nationality chosen Highly cited researcher, the Thomson Reuters agency list of the most cited scientists of the last 10 years. From 2014 to 2019, he has appeared every year in the Highly cited researchers list.

== Awards and honours ==
- 2019, Member of the Scientific Advisory Committee of Fundación Gadea Ciencia.
- 2020, Distinction in Ecology Luís Balaguer and honorary member of the Spanish Association of Terrestrial Ecology (AEET).
- 2020, North-South Prize from the Council of Europe to the Mediterranean Experts on Climate and Environmental Change (MedECC) network.
- 2021, Mercer Award from the Ecological Society of America.
- 2021, Numerary member of the Real Academia Sevillana de Ciencias.
- 2021, Premio Nacional de Investigación Alejandro Malaspina in the area of Science and Technology of Natural Resources.
