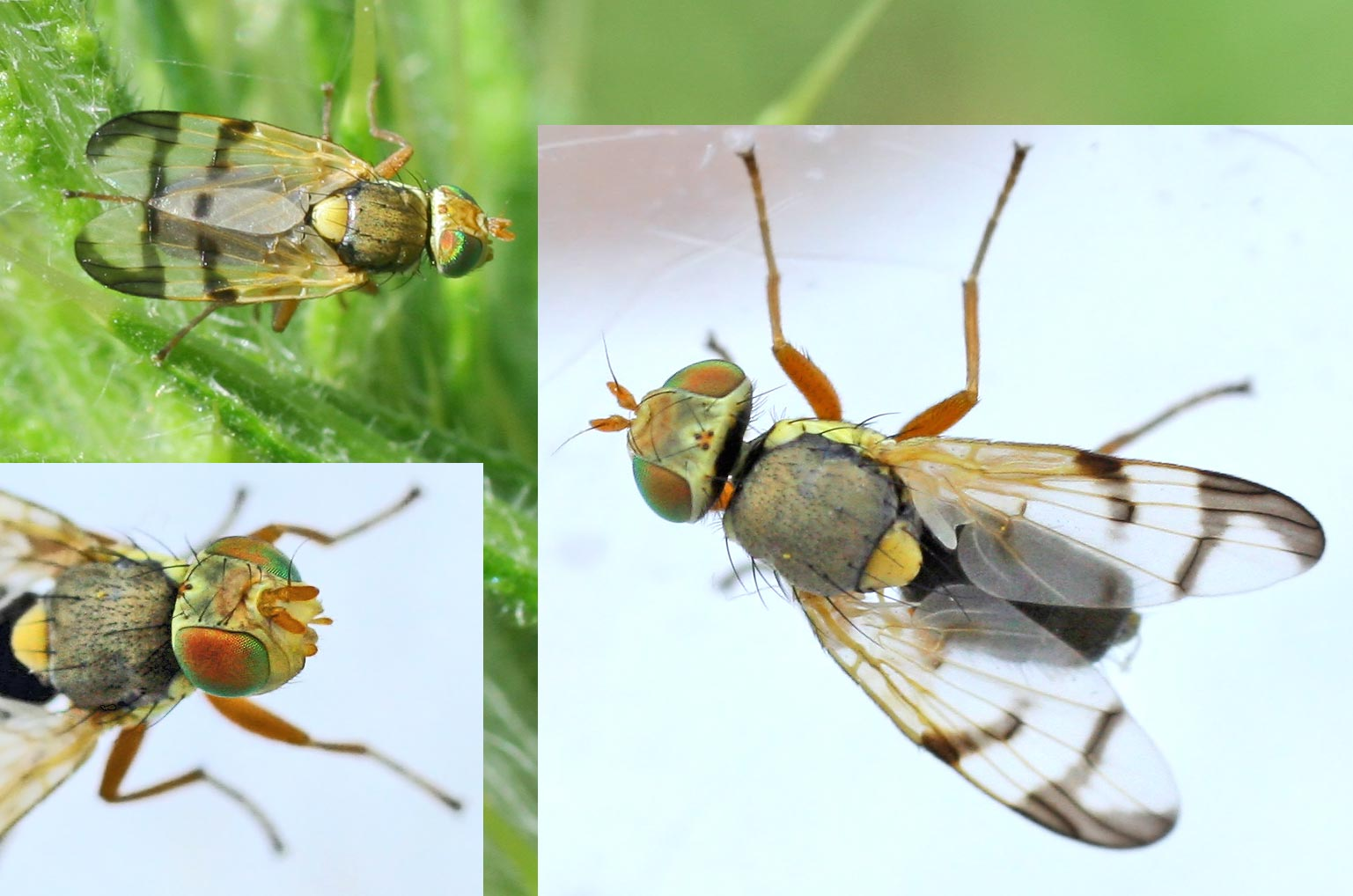
- Urophora affinis

Scientific classification
- Kingdom: Animalia
- Phylum: Arthropoda
- Class: Insecta
- Order: Diptera
- Family: Tephritidae
- Subfamily: Tephritinae
- Tribe: Myopitini
- Genus: Urophora
- Species: U. affinis

Binomial name
- Urophora affinis (Frauenfeld, 1857)

Synonyms
- Trypeta affinis Frauenfeld, 1857

= Urophora affinis =

Species of fly

Urophora affinis is a species of tephritid or fruit flies in the genus Urophora of the family Tephritidae. It has been released in the United States and Canada as a biocontrol agent to control spotted knapweed. U. affinis became established in Montana in 1973.

== Life history ==
U. affinis is multivoltine and overwinters as a larva in knapweed flower heads. In June, adults oviposit on seed heads. Each female can produce about 120 eggs. It has been shown to reduce seed production in knapweed (spotted and diffuse) by up to 95% but that is insufficient for effective management of either species. Overwintering Urophora larvae are heavily preyed upon by deer mice Peromyscus maniculatus. The inability of Urophora species to control knapweed led to the introduction of other biocontrol agents, including the weevils Larinus minutus and Bangasternus fausti, which also attack seed heads of knanpweed. In cage experiments, larvae of Larinus minutus and Bangasternus fausti have been shown to consume the developing U. affinis. Reproduction of U. affinis was reduced by L. minutus.

== Distribution ==
France & Germany East to Ukraine & southwest Russia, Italy, Balkans, Turkey & Iran; introduced to North America
