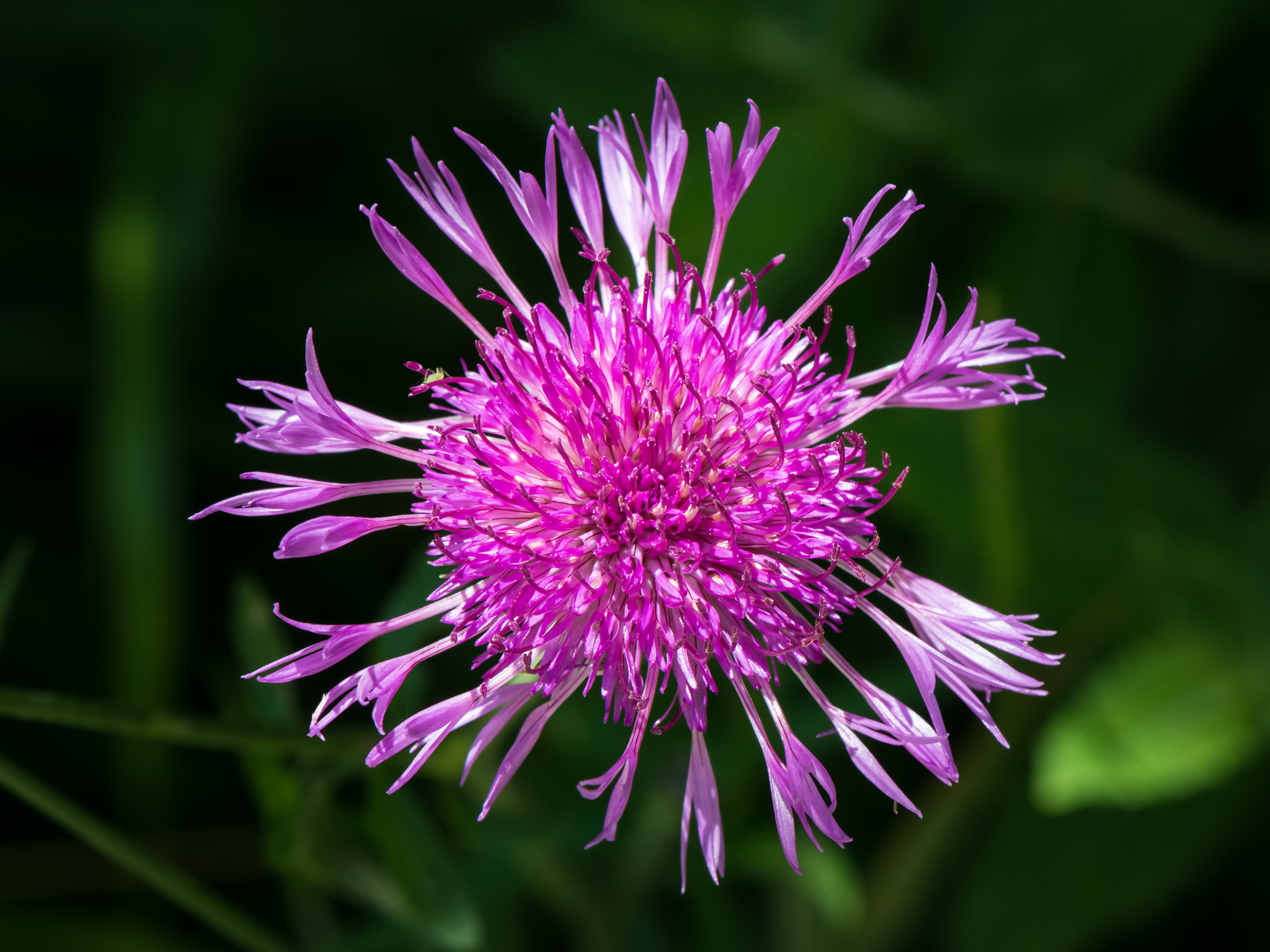

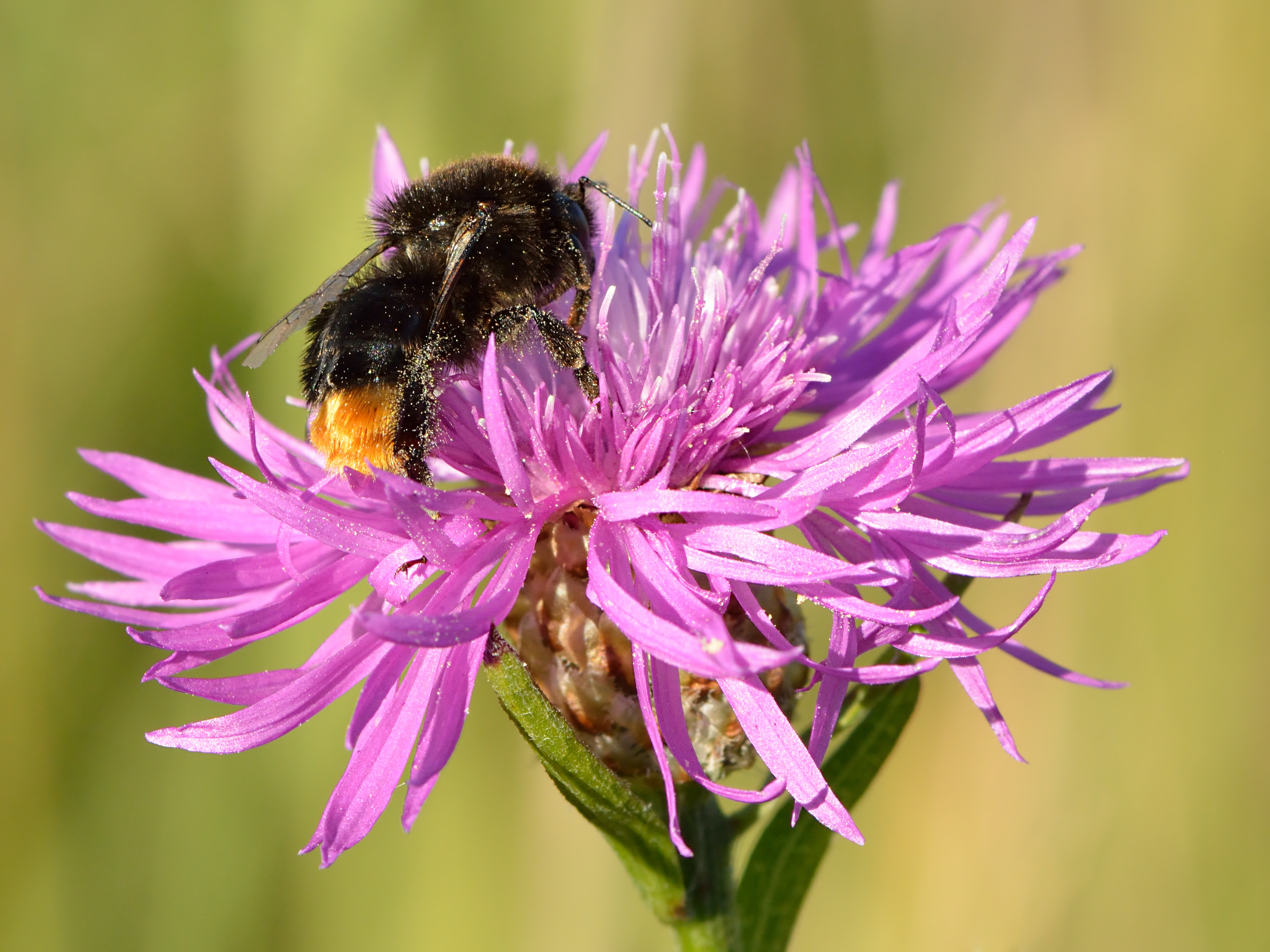

Scientific classification
- Kingdom: Plantae
- Clade: Tracheophytes
- Clade: Angiosperms
- Clade: Eudicots
- Clade: Asterids
- Order: Asterales
- Family: Asteraceae
- Genus: Centaurea
- Species: C. jacea

Binomial name
- Centaurea jacea L.

Synonyms
- Centaurea vulgaris var. jacea (L.) Godr.; Calcitrapa jacea (L.) Peterm.; Jacea pratensis Lam.

= Centaurea jacea =

Species of flowering plant

Centaurea jacea, brown knapweed or brownray knapweed, is a species of herbaceous perennial plants in the genus Centaurea native to dry meadows and open woodland throughout Europe.

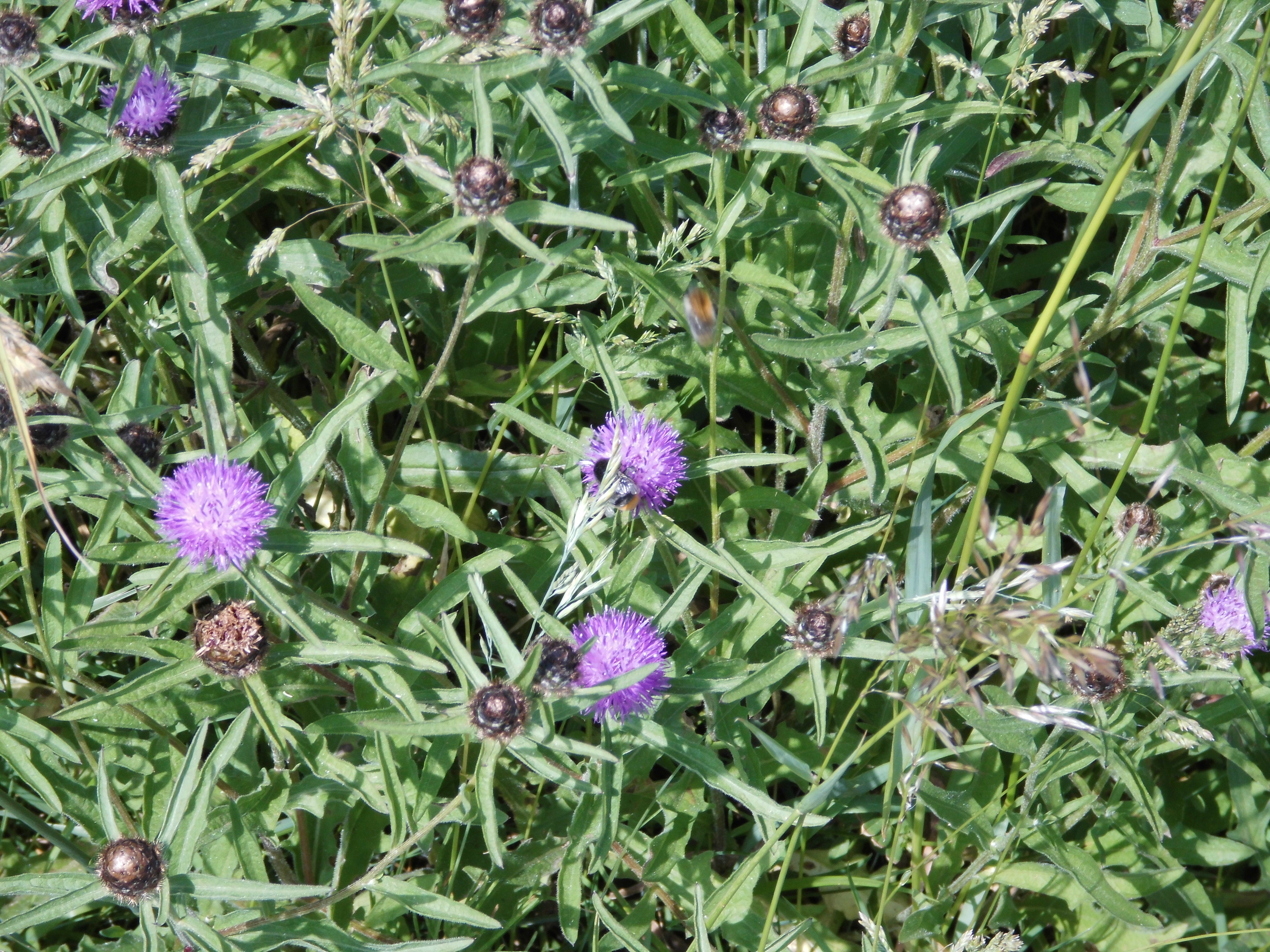
Centaurea jacea

In Britain and America, it is often found as a hybrid of black knapweed, Centaurea nigra. Unlike the black knapweed, the flower heads always look as if they are rayed, forming a more open star rather than a brush-like tuft.

== Distribution ==
Brown knapweed is native to Europe, extending to West Siberia and Caucasus. It has been introduced in North America, where it is often considered an invasive species, particularly in the northeastern United States and Canada.

== Description ==
=== Habit ===
Perennial herb that grows up to 20-100 cm tall.

=== Stem ===
Single or branched, straight erect, angular and rough.

=== Leaves ===
Stem leaves gathered in a rosette, single, ovate to lanceolate, often pinnately-arched, petioled. Stem leaves sedentary, entire-edged with a tapered base.

=== Flowers ===
Collected in baskets set singly at the top of the stems, 2-6 cm wide. The basket has a perianth that is 1-2 cm long, egg-shaped. The leaves of the sheath are rounded, entire-edged, or crested, pale to brown in color. Flowers are tubular, violet-purple, occasionally white. Marginal flowers larger, fertile with a distinctly bipinnate corolla, inner flowers hermaphroditic. The stamens push the anthers upward under the touch of an insect, making it easier for them to carry pollen. Flowering occurs from June to October.

=== Fruits ===
Shiny achenes, inverted ovate, about 3 mm long, without a pappus.
