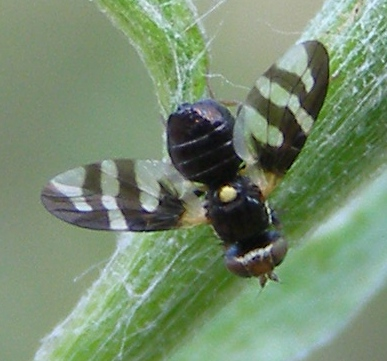
- Urophora quadrifasciata

Scientific classification
- Kingdom: Animalia
- Phylum: Arthropoda
- Class: Insecta
- Order: Diptera
- Family: Tephritidae
- Subfamily: Tephritinae
- Tribe: Myopitini
- Genus: Urophora
- Species: U. quadrifasciata

Binomial name
- Urophora quadrifasciata (Meigen, 1826)

Synonyms
- Trypeta quadrifaciata Meigen, 1826; Trypeta quadrifasciata Meigen, 1826; Urophora dejeanii Robineau-Desvoidy, 1830

= Urophora quadrifasciata =

Species of fly

Urophora quadrifasciata is a species of tephritid or fruit flies in the genus Urophora of the family Tephritidae. The host plant for the larvae is usually a knapweed (Centaurea sp), and because of this, it is used to control Centaurea stoebe.

== Distribution ==
Europe & Kazakhstan, North Africa & Iran; introduced North America & Australia.
