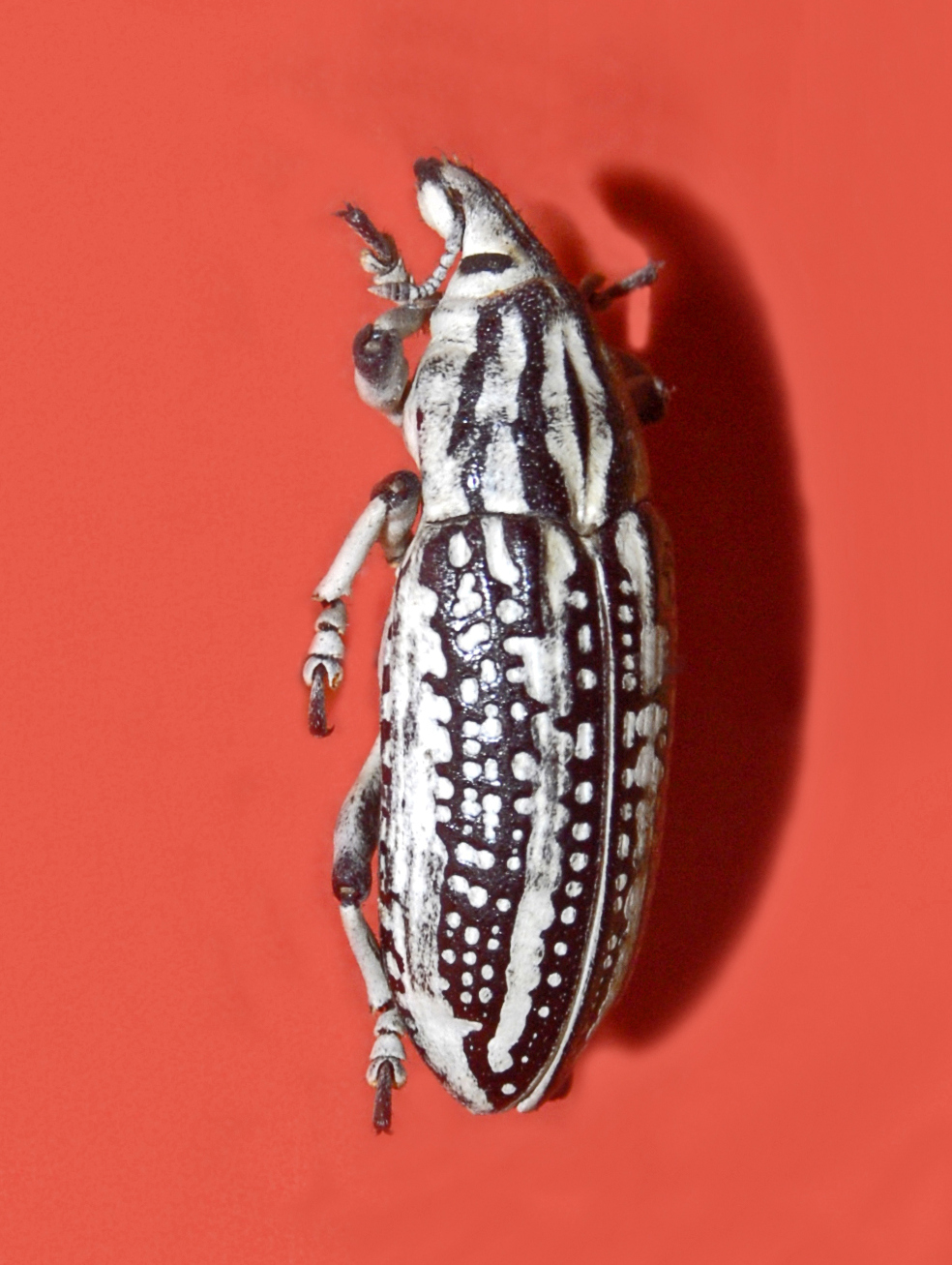
- Mounted specimen of Liocleonus clathratus

Scientific classification
- Kingdom: Animalia
- Phylum: Arthropoda
- Clade: Pancrustacea
- Class: Insecta
- Order: Coleoptera
- Suborder: Polyphaga
- Infraorder: Cucujiformia
- Superfamily: Curculionoidea
- Family: Curculionidae
- Genus: Liocleonus
- Species: L. clathratus

Binomial name
- Liocleonus clathratus (Olivier, 1807)

Synonyms
- Lixus clathratus Olivier, 1807; Cleonus leucomelanus Gemminger & Harold, 1871; Cleonus leucomelas Lucas, 1846; Liocleonus amoenus Chevrolat, 1876; Lixus clatratus

= Liocleonus clathratus =

Species of beetle

Liocleonus clathratus is a species of cylindrical weevils belonging to the family Curculionidae.

== Description ==
Liocleonus clathratus can reach a length of about 1 centimetre (0.39 in). The body is elongated and the basic coloration is white, with longitudinal black markings on the pronotum and elytrae. These weevils are considered a serious pest. They attacks several Tamarix species, especially Tamarix ramosissima, Tamarix parviflora and Tamarix gallica . Larvae develop in huge galls on the roots and at the base of young rods of the host plants. These gall-maker weevils can be found mainly in April.

== Distribution ==
This species is widespread in the eastern Palearctic realm, in the Near East, and in North Africa.
