= List of Cleonis species =

This is a list of 123 species in Cleonis, a genus of cylindrical weevils in the family Curculionidae.

== Cleonis species ==
- Cleonis albicans Sturm, 1826^{c}
- Cleonis albida Dejean, 1821^{c}
- Cleonis albolineata Sturm, 1826^{c}
- Cleonis albovestita O'Brien & Wibmer, 1982^{c}
- Cleonis alternans Dejean, 1821^{c}
- Cleonis arabs Dejean, 1821^{c}
- Cleonis arctica Dejean, 1821^{c}
- Cleonis atomaria Dejean, 1821^{c}
- Cleonis attenuata Dejean, 1821^{c}
- Cleonis barbara Dejean, 1821^{c}
- Cleonis bicarinata Fischer, 1830^{c}
- Cleonis bipunctata Zoubkoff, 1829^{c}
- Cleonis boucardi O'Brien & Wibmer, 1982^{c}
- Cleonis brevirostris Dejean,^{c}
- Cleonis bryanti O'Brien & Wibmer, 1982^{c}
- Cleonis calandroides O'Brien & Wibmer, 1982^{c}
- Cleonis californica O'Brien & Wibmer, 1982^{c}
- Cleonis capensis Dejean,^{c}
- Cleonis carinata Zoubkoff, 1829^{c}
- Cleonis chilensis Blanchard, E. in Gay, 1851^{c}
- Cleonis cinerea Dejean, 1821^{c}
- Cleonis clathrata Dejean, 1821^{c}
- Cleonis complanata Zubkov, 1833^{c}
- Cleonis corioginosa Zubkov, 1833^{c}
- Cleonis cristata O'Brien & Wibmer, 1982^{c}
- Cleonis daurica Steven,^{c}
- Cleonis declivis Sturm, 1826^{c}
- Cleonis densa O'Brien & Wibmer, 1982^{c}
- Cleonis dentata O'Brien & Wibmer, 1982^{c}
- Cleonis denticollis O'Brien & Wibmer, 1982^{c}
- Cleonis distincta Dejean, 1821^{c}
- Cleonis ericeti Dejean, 1821^{c}
- Cleonis excavata Zubkov, 1833^{c}
- Cleonis excoriata Dejean, 1821^{c}
- Cleonis farcta O'Brien & Wibmer, 1982^{c}
- Cleonis fasciata Fischer, 1830^{c}
- Cleonis faunus Dejean, 1821^{c}
- Cleonis fossulata Fischer von Waldheim, 1823^{c}
- Cleonis fossa O'Brien & Wibmer, 1982^{c}
- Cleonis foveolata Fischer von Waldheim, 1823^{c}
- Cleonis frontata Fischer von Waldheim, 1823^{c}
- Cleonis furcata Zubkov, 1833^{c}
- Cleonis glauca Dejean, 1821^{c}
- Cleonis globulosa Villa & Villa in Catteneo, 1844^{c}
- Cleonis grammica Dejean, 1821^{c}
- Cleonis granosa Zubkov, 1833^{c}
- Cleonis granulata Fischer, 1823^{c}
- Cleonis granulosa Mannerheim, 1824^{c}
- Cleonis hieroglyphica Dejean,^{c}
- Cleonis hololeuca Fischer von Waldheim, 1823^{c}
- Cleonis humeralis Zoubkoff, 1829^{c}
- Cleonis hystrix O'Brien & Wibmer, 1982^{c}
- Cleonis illustris Dejean, 1821^{c}
- Cleonis imperialis Karelin, 1837^{c}
- Cleonis infracticornis Sturm, 1826^{c}
- Cleonis inscripta Dejean, 1821^{c}
- Cleonis interrupta Zoubkoff, 1829^{c}
- Cleonis jacobina O'Brien & Wibmer, 1982^{c}
- Cleonis lateralis Sturm, 1826^{c}
- Cleonis leucon Sturm, 1826^{c}
- Cleonis leucophylla Fischer, 1823^{c}
- Cleonis leucoptera Fischer von Waldheim, 1823^{c}
- Cleonis livida Dejean, 1821^{c}
- Cleonis lugens Sturm, 1843^{c}
- Cleonis lupinus O'Brien & Wibmer, 1982^{c}
- Cleonis madida Dejean, 1821^{c}
- Cleonis marginata Fischer von Waldheim, 1823^{c}
- Cleonis marmorata Dejean, 1821^{c}
- Cleonis mexicana O'Brien & Wibmer, 1982^{c}
- Cleonis mixta O'Brien & Wibmer, 1982^{c}
- Cleonis modesta (Mannerheim, 1843)^{i c}
- Cleonis morbillosa Dejean, 1821^{c}
- Cleonis myagri Dejean, 1821^{c}
- Cleonis nebulosa Dejean, 1821^{c}
- Cleonis obliqua Dejean, 1821^{c}
- Cleonis obsoleta Sturm, 1826^{c}
- Cleonis ocularis Dejean, 1821^{c}
- Cleonis oculata Fischer, 1830^{c}
- Cleonis ophthalmica Dejean, 1821^{c}
- Cleonis pacifica Dejean, 1821^{c}
- Cleonis palmata Dejean, 1821^{c}
- Cleonis perlata Dejean, 1821^{c}
- Cleonis pigra (Scopoli, J.A., 1763)^{c g} (large thistle weevil)
- Cleonis pilosa O'Brien & Wibmer, 1982^{c}
- Cleonis pleuralis O'Brien & Wibmer, 1982^{c}
- Cleonis plicata Dejean, 1821^{c}
- Cleonis plumbea O'Brien & Wibmer, 1982^{c}
- Cleonis porcata O'Brien & Wibmer, 1982^{c}
- Cleonis poricollis O'Brien & Wibmer, 1982^{c}
- Cleonis porosa O'Brien & Wibmer, 1982^{c}
- Cleonis praepotens O'Brien & Wibmer, 1982^{c}
- Cleonis pulverulenta Zoubkoff, 1829^{c}
- Cleonis punctiventris Sturm, 1826^{c}
- Cleonis quadricarinata Dejean, 1821^{c}
- Cleonis quadrilineata O'Brien & Wibmer, 1982^{c}
- Cleonis quadrimaculata Sturm, 1826^{c}
- Cleonis quadrisulcata Sturm, 1826^{c}
- Cleonis quadrivittata Zoubkoff, 1829^{c}
- Cleonis quinquelineata Sturm, 1826^{c}
- Cleonis raphilinea Sturm, 1826^{c}
- Cleonis ritablancaensis (Sleeper, 1969)^{i}
- Cleonis rorida Dejean, 1821^{c}
- Cleonis rudis Klug,^{c}
- Cleonis saginata O'Brien & Wibmer, 1982^{c}
- Cleonis sardoa Chevrolat, 1869^{g}
- Cleonis scabrosa Sturm, 1826^{c}
- Cleonis sexmaculata Zubkov, 1832^{c}
- Cleonis sisymbrii Dahl,^{c}
- Cleonis sparsa Zubkov, 1833^{c}
- Cleonis stigma Sturm, 1826^{c}
- Cleonis striatopunctata Sturm, 1826^{c}
- Cleonis sulcirostris Dejean, 1821^{c}
- Cleonis texana O'Brien & Wibmer, 1982^{c}
- Cleonis tigrina Dejean, 1821^{c}
- Cleonis tigris Schneider, 1829^{c}
- Cleonis tricarinata Fischer, 1823^{c}
- Cleonis vittata Zoubkoff, 1829^{c}
- Cleonis wickhami O'Brien & Wibmer, 1982^{c}

Data sources: i = ITIS, c = Catalogue of Life, g = GBIF
