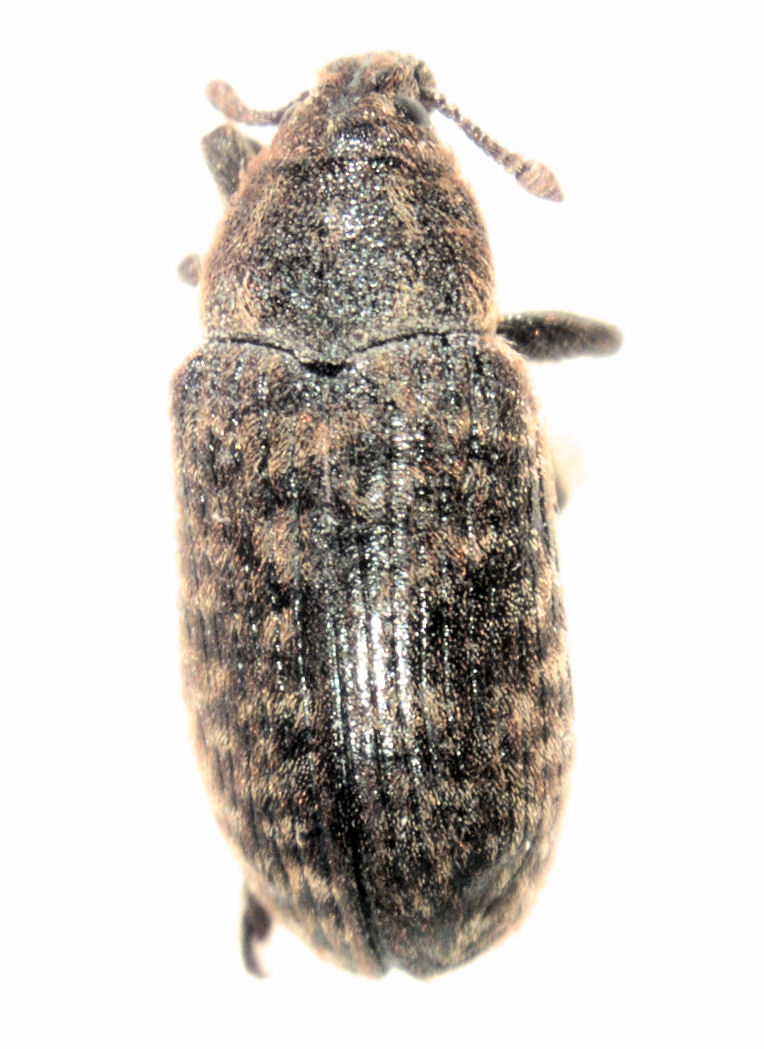
- Rhinocyllus conicus

Scientific classification
- Kingdom: Animalia
- Phylum: Arthropoda
- Clade: Pancrustacea
- Class: Insecta
- Order: Coleoptera
- Suborder: Polyphaga
- Infraorder: Cucujiformia
- Superfamily: Curculionoidea
- Family: Curculionidae
- Subfamily: Lixinae
- Tribe: Rhinocyllini
- Genus: Rhinocyllus; Germar, 1817

= Rhinocyllus =

Genus of beetles

Rhinocyllus is a small genus of true weevil, with 4 species described. The host plants of this genus are thistles in the subtribe Carduinae. Its sister group is Bangasternus.

The most well-known species is R. conicus which is a controversial agent of biological pest control which has been used against noxious thistles in the genera Carduus, Cirsium, Onopordum, and Silybum.

== Species ==
- Rhinocyllus alpinus Gültekin, Diotti & Caldara, 2019
- Rhinocyllus conicus (Frölich, 1792)
- Rhinocyllus oblongus Capiomont, 1873
- Rhinocyllus turkestanicus Desbrochers des Loges, 1900
