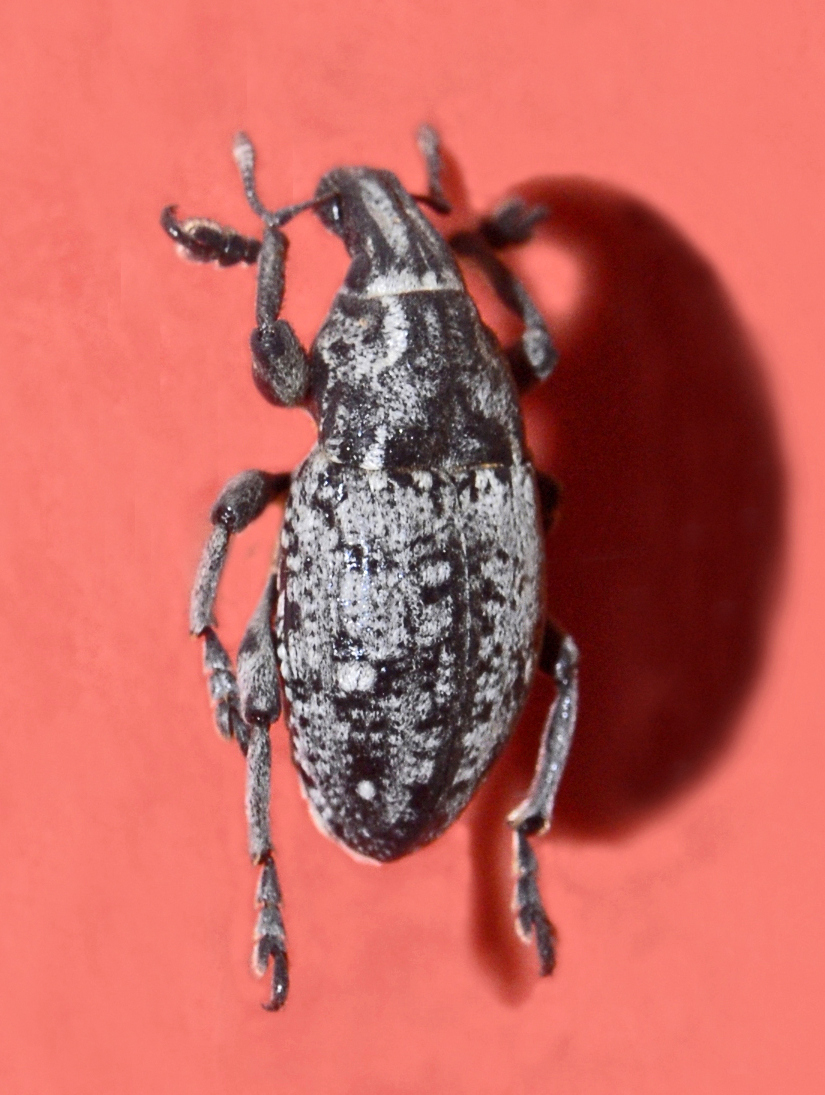
- Museum specimen of Leucophyes pedestris

Scientific classification
- Kingdom: Animalia
- Phylum: Arthropoda
- Clade: Pancrustacea
- Class: Insecta
- Order: Coleoptera
- Suborder: Polyphaga
- Infraorder: Cucujiformia
- Superfamily: Curculionoidea
- Family: Curculionidae
- Genus: Leucophyes
- Species: L. pedestris

Binomial name
- Leucophyes pedestris (Poda, 1761)

Synonyms
- Cleonus ocellatus Fahaeus, 1842; Cleonus ophthalmicus (Rossi, 1790); Cleonus pedestris (Poda, 1761); Cleonus quadripunctatus (Schrank, 1789); Curculio colon Laicharting, 1781; Curculio distinctus Fabricius, 1792; Curculio momus Scopoli, 1763; Curculio ophthalmicus Rossi, 1790; Curculio pedestris Poda, 1761; Curculio quadripunctatus Schrank, 1789

= Leucophyes pedestris =

Species of beetle

Leucophyes pedestris is a species of cylindrical weevils belonging to the family Curculionidae.

== Description ==
Leucophyes pedestris can reach a length of about 15 millimetres (0.59 in) (rostrum included). The body is elongate shape, with a dark brown or greyish basic color. Adults can be found from May to September.

== Distribution and habitat ==
This species is present in the southern Europe, in the southern part of the Central Europe, in the Near East and in North Africa. It lives in open areas, pastures, dry grasslands and forest clearings.
