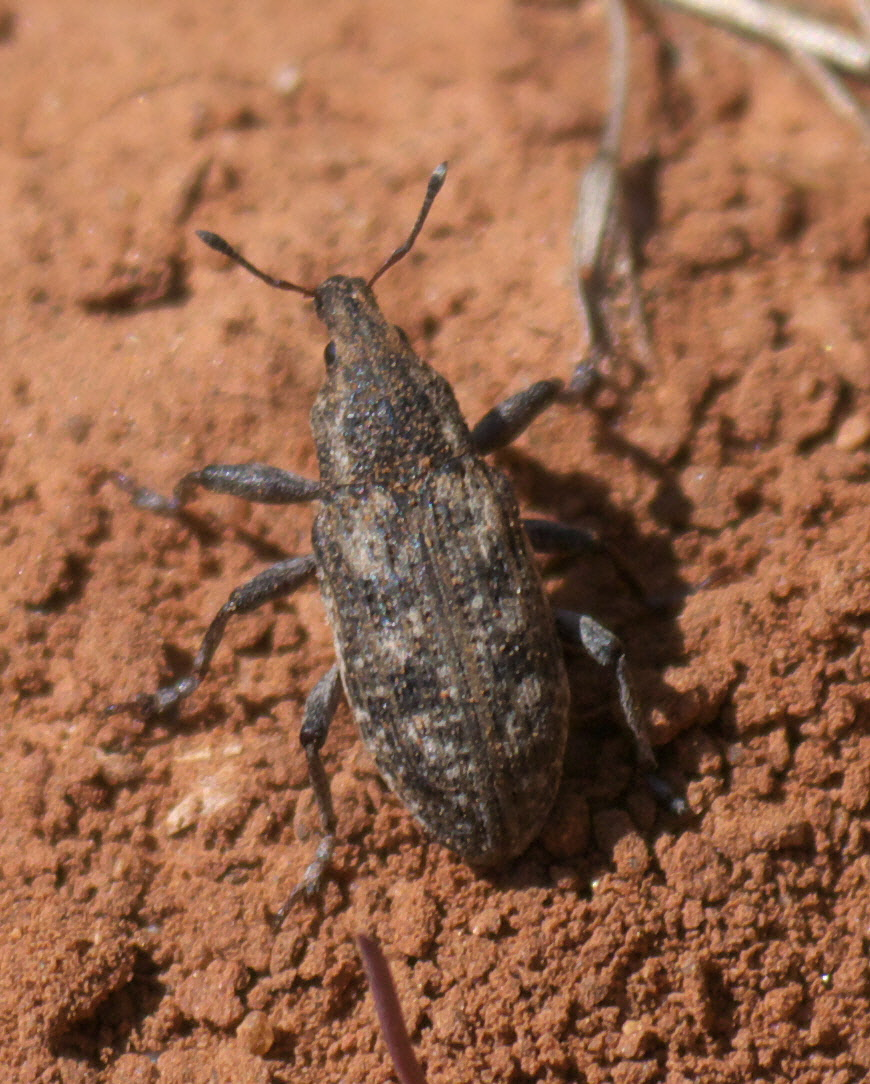
- Apleurus lutulentus

Scientific classification
- Kingdom: Animalia
- Phylum: Arthropoda
- Clade: Pancrustacea
- Class: Insecta
- Order: Coleoptera
- Suborder: Polyphaga
- Infraorder: Cucujiformia
- Superfamily: Curculionoidea
- Family: Curculionidae
- Subfamily: Lixinae
- Tribe: Cleonini
- Genus: Apleurus; Chevrolat, 1873

= Apleurus =

Genus of beetles

Apleurus is a genus of cylindrical weevils in the beetle family Curculionidae. There are about eight described species in Apleurus.

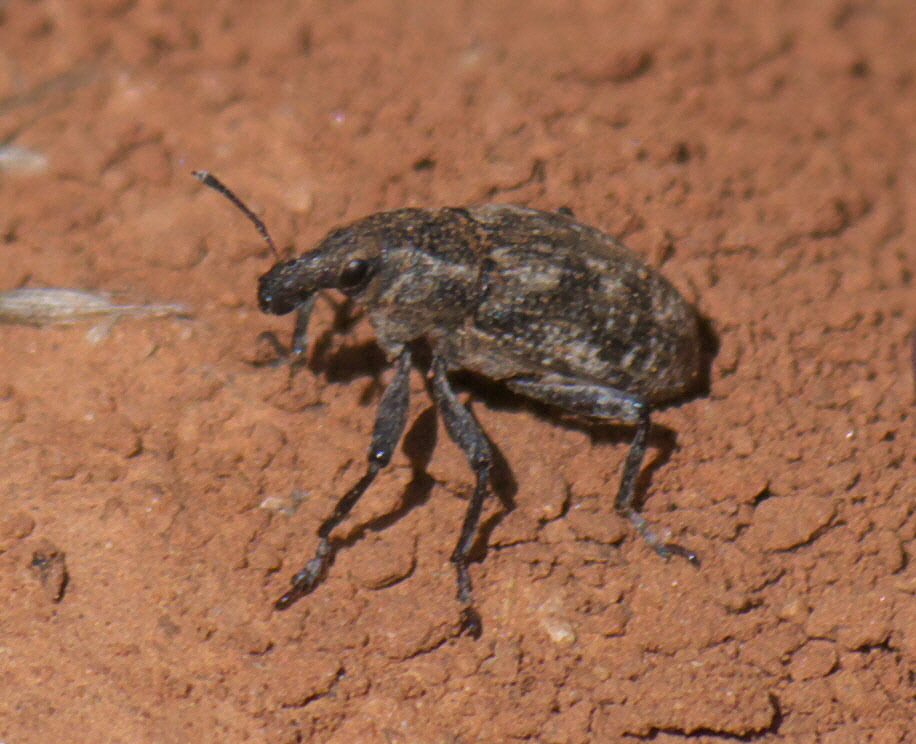
Apleurus lutulentus

== Species ==
These eight species belong to the genus Apleurus:

- Apleurus albovestitus (Casey, 1891)
- Apleurus angularis (LeConte, 1859)
- Apleurus aztecus Anderson, 1987
- Apleurus hystrix (Fall, 1913)
- Apleurus jacobinus (Casey, 1891)
- Apleurus lutulentus (LeConte, 1859)
- Apleurus porosus (LeConte, 1876)
- Apleurus saginatus (Casey, 1891)
