= Apleurus albovestitus =

Scientific classification
- Kingdom: Animalia
- Phylum: Arthropoda
- Clade: Pancrustacea
- Class: Insecta
- Order: Coleoptera
- Suborder: Polyphaga
- Infraorder: Cucujiformia
- Superfamily: Curculionoidea
- Family: Curculionidae
- Genus: Apleurus
- Species: A. albovestitus

Binomial name
- Apleurus albovestitus (Casey, 1891)

Synonyms
- Cleonis structor (Csiki, 1934); Cleonis wickhami (Casey, 1891); Cleonus structor Csiki, 1934; Dinocleus densus Casey, 1891; Dinocleus interruptus Casey, 1904; Dinocleus mexicanus Casey, 1904; Dinocleus wickhami Casey, 1891

Species of beetle

Apleurus albovestitus is a species of cylindrical weevil in the beetle family Curculionidae. It is found in North America.
