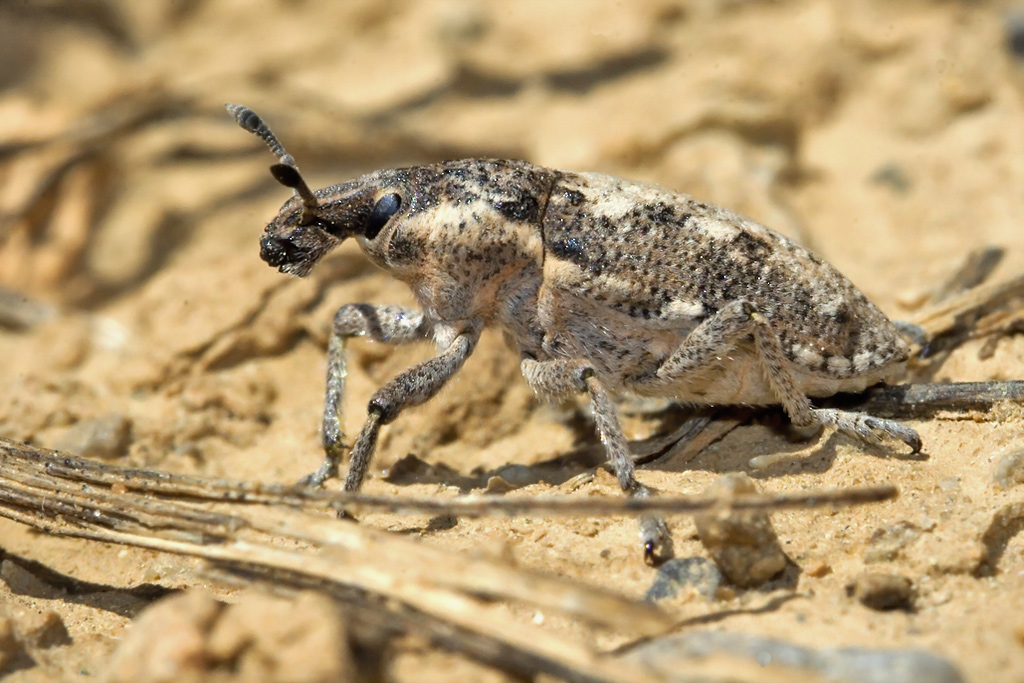
- Weevil Pachycerus sp

Scientific classification
- Kingdom: Animalia
- Phylum: Arthropoda
- Clade: Pancrustacea
- Class: Insecta
- Order: Coleoptera
- Suborder: Polyphaga
- Infraorder: Cucujiformia
- Superfamily: Curculionoidea
- Family: Curculionidae
- Subfamily: Lixinae
- Tribe: Cleonini
- Genus: Pachycerus; Schoenherr, 1823

= Pachycerus =

Genus of beetles

Pachycerus is a genus of "true weevils", family Curculionidae, confined to the Palaearctic and African regions.

== Description ==
The genus includes moderately-sized weevils (6–12 mm).

== Partial species list ==
- Pachycerus borrae F. Solari 1950
- Pachycerus cordiger (Germar 1818)
- Pachycerus sellatus Faust 1904
- Pachycerus somaliensis Meregalli, 2002
