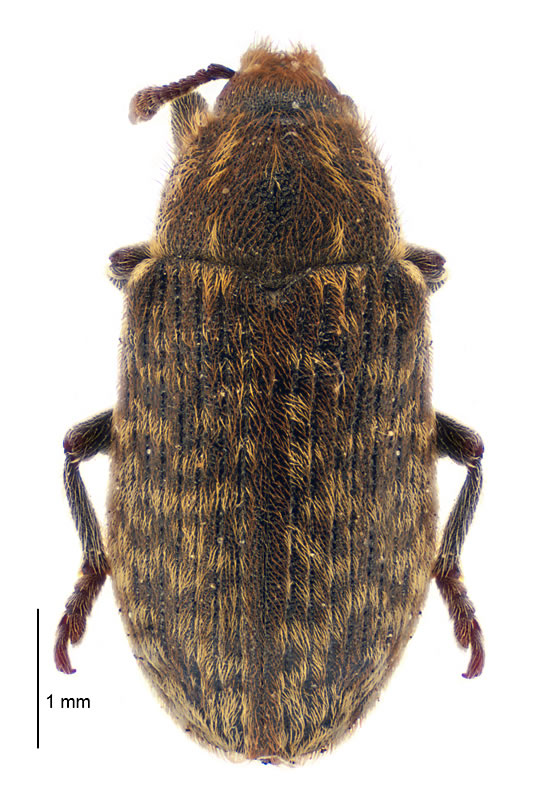
- Dorsal view of Rhinocyllus conicus
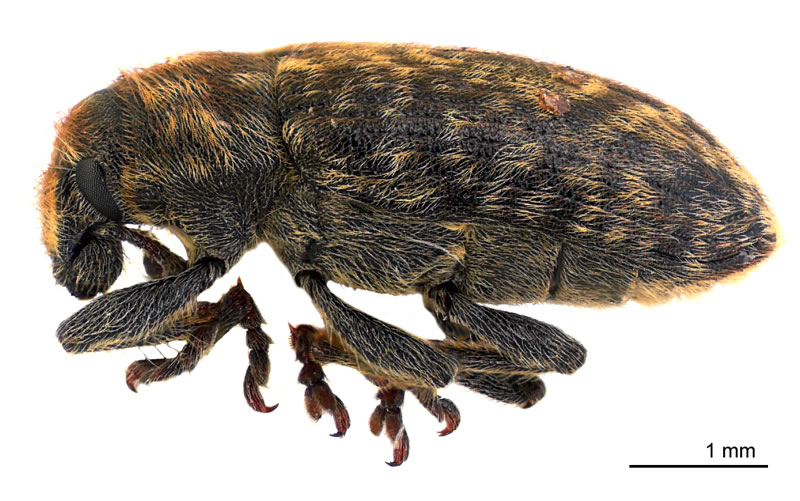
- Lateral view of Rhinocyllus conicus

Scientific classification
- Kingdom: Animalia
- Phylum: Arthropoda
- Clade: Pancrustacea
- Class: Insecta
- Order: Coleoptera
- Suborder: Polyphaga
- Infraorder: Cucujiformia
- Superfamily: Curculionoidea
- Family: Curculionidae
- Genus: Rhinocyllus
- Species: R. conicus

Binomial name
- Rhinocyllus conicus (Frölich, 1792)

Synonyms
- Curculio conicus Froelich, 1792; Curculio thaumaturgus Rossi, 1794

= Rhinocyllus conicus =

Species of beetle

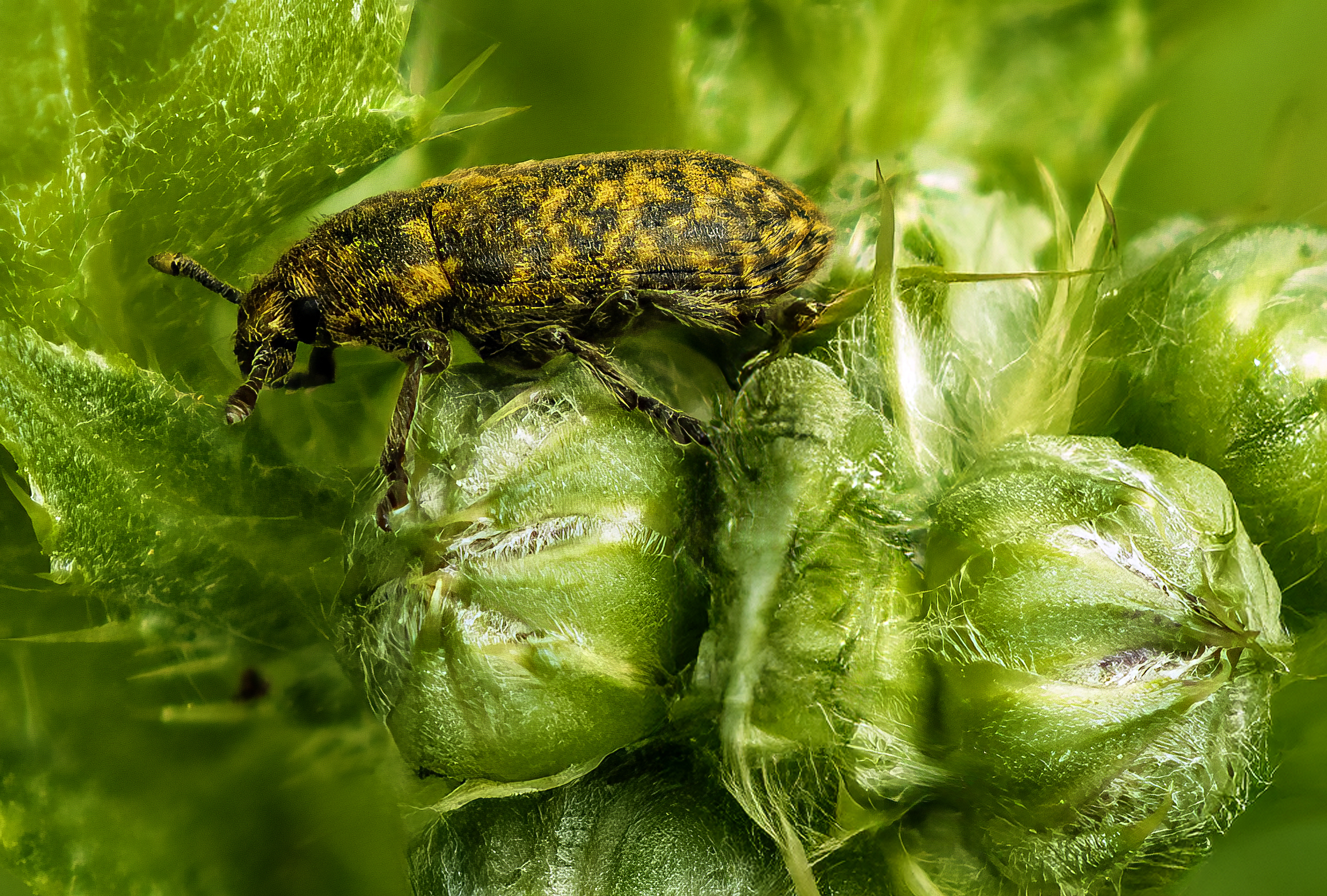
Rhinocyllus conicus on Cirsium arvense

Rhinocyllus conicus is a species of true weevil. It is best known as a controversial agent of biological pest control which has been used against noxious thistles in the genera Carduus, Cirsium, Onopordum, and Silybum.

The adult weevil is black and covered in a thin black and yellowish mottled coat of hairs. It is a short-snouted beetle up to 6 millimeters in total body length. The female lays over 100 eggs on or near the bracts of the thistle flower head. She covers the eggs with masticated plant tissue to protect them from predators. When the white larva emerges from its egg it burrows into the flower head and feeds on the flower parts and developing seeds. As it grows it deposits frass and chewed plant tissue on the walls of its chamber, producing a rigid protective shell in which it will pupate. Pupation takes up to two weeks and when the weevil emerges as an adult it remains inside the chamber for a few more weeks before tunneling out of the plant.

Damage to the plant occurs mainly from larval destruction of the flower head, which prevents seed production. Some larvae tunnel through the upper stem instead of chambering in a flower head; this can also be destructive to the plant. Adults do some damage as well when they feed on the foliage. Thistles which reproduce only via seed, such as musk thistle, are controlled well by this weevil and its seed head destroying larvae. Some thistles are able to reproduce vegetatively, and while they are impacted as well, they can sometimes survive.

This weevil is native to Eurasia and North Africa. It was first introduced to the United States for thistle biocontrol in 1969, and it is now widely established in that country. The weevil was found to be very effective in reducing the spread of invasive thistles, particularly musk thistle, but also welted, Italian, bull, milk, and other thistles. However, the weevil will also readily attack native thistles of genus Cirsium, in some cases contributing to population decline. It is for this reason that this weevil is no longer recommended for distribution as a biocontrol agent. Further releases of the weevil are prohibited in many areas.
