= Lixomorphus algirus =

- Museum specimen of Lixomorphus algirus

Scientific classification
- Kingdom: Animalia
- Phylum: Arthropoda
- Clade: Pancrustacea
- Class: Insecta
- Order: Coleoptera
- Suborder: Polyphaga
- Infraorder: Cucujiformia
- Superfamily: Curculionoidea
- Family: Curculionidae
- Genus: Lixomorphus
- Species: L. algirus

Binomial name
- Lixomorphus algirus Thompson & Alonso-Zarazaga, 1988

Species of beetle

Lixomorphus algirus is a species of weevil in the beetle family Curculionidae.
