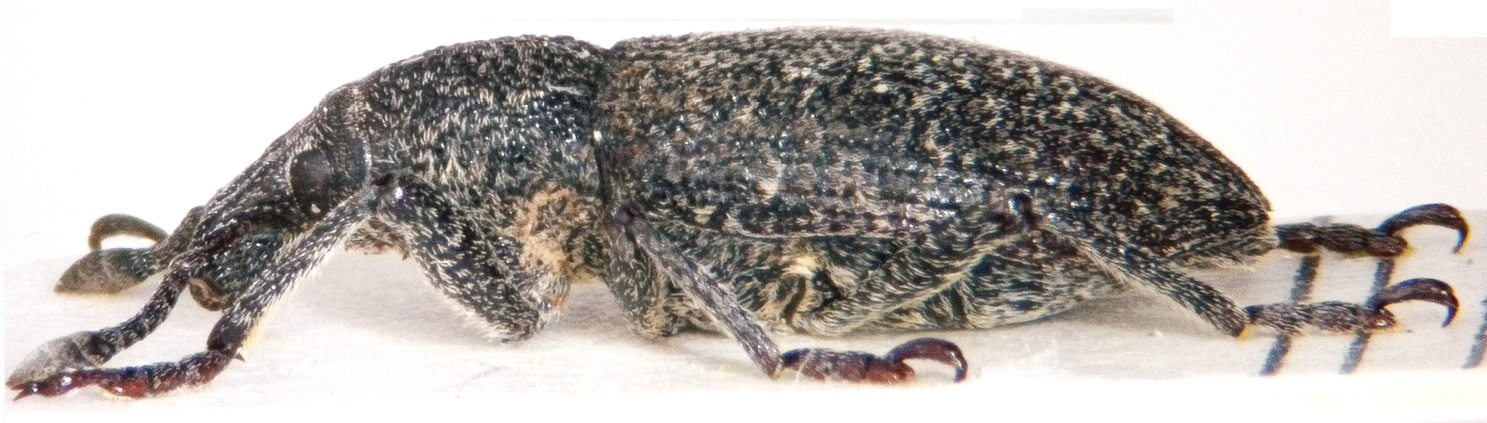

Scientific classification
- Kingdom: Animalia
- Phylum: Arthropoda
- Clade: Pancrustacea
- Class: Insecta
- Order: Coleoptera
- Suborder: Polyphaga
- Infraorder: Cucujiformia
- Superfamily: Curculionoidea
- Family: Curculionidae
- Subfamily: Lixinae
- Tribe: Cleonini
- Genus: Rhabdorrhynchus

Species
- Rhabdorrhynchus karelini; Rhabdorrhynchus menetriesii; Rhabdorrhynchus mixtus; Rhabdorrhynchus motschulsky; Rhabdorrhynchus seriegranosus

= Rhabdorrhynchus =

Genus of beetles

Rhabdorrhynchus is a genus of weevil found in Central Europe. It includes five known species.
