= Apleurus angularis =

Scientific classification
- Kingdom: Animalia
- Phylum: Arthropoda
- Clade: Pancrustacea
- Class: Insecta
- Order: Coleoptera
- Suborder: Polyphaga
- Infraorder: Cucujiformia
- Superfamily: Curculionoidea
- Family: Curculionidae
- Genus: Apleurus
- Species: A. angularis

Binomial name
- Apleurus angularis (LeConte, 1859)

Synonyms
- Dinocleus denticollis Casey, 1891; Dinocleus porcatus Casey, 1904

Species of beetle

Apleurus angularis is a species of cylindrical weevil in the beetle family Curculionidae. It is found in North America.
