= Stephanocleonus plumbeus =

Scientific classification
- Kingdom: Animalia
- Phylum: Arthropoda
- Clade: Pancrustacea
- Class: Insecta
- Order: Coleoptera
- Suborder: Polyphaga
- Infraorder: Cucujiformia
- Superfamily: Curculionoidea
- Family: Curculionidae
- Genus: Stephanocleonus
- Species: S. plumbeus

Binomial name
- Stephanocleonus plumbeus LeConte, 1876

Species of beetle

Stephanocleonus plumbeus is a species of cylindrical weevil in the beetle family Curculionidae. It is found in North America. It was found in 1876 by LeConte.
