= Lixomorphus =

- Museum specimen of Lixomorphus algirus

Scientific classification
- Kingdom: Animalia
- Phylum: Arthropoda
- Clade: Pancrustacea
- Class: Insecta
- Order: Coleoptera
- Suborder: Polyphaga
- Infraorder: Cucujiformia
- Superfamily: Curculionoidea
- Family: Curculionidae
- Subfamily: Lixinae
- Tribe: Cleonini
- Genus: Lixomorphus; Faust, 1904

Genus of beetles

Lixomorphus is a genus of cylindrical weevils belonging to the family Curculionidae. This genus is present in most of Europe and in North Africa.

== Species ==
- Lixomorphus algirus (Herbst, 1795)
