= Apleurus saginatus =

Scientific classification
- Kingdom: Animalia
- Phylum: Arthropoda
- Clade: Pancrustacea
- Class: Insecta
- Order: Coleoptera
- Suborder: Polyphaga
- Infraorder: Cucujiformia
- Superfamily: Curculionoidea
- Family: Curculionidae
- Genus: Apleurus
- Species: A. saginatus

Binomial name
- Apleurus saginatus (Casey, 1891)

Synonyms
- Dinocleus dentatus Champion, 1906

Species of beetle

Apleurus saginatus is a species of cylindrical weevil in the beetle family Curculionidae. It is found in North America.
