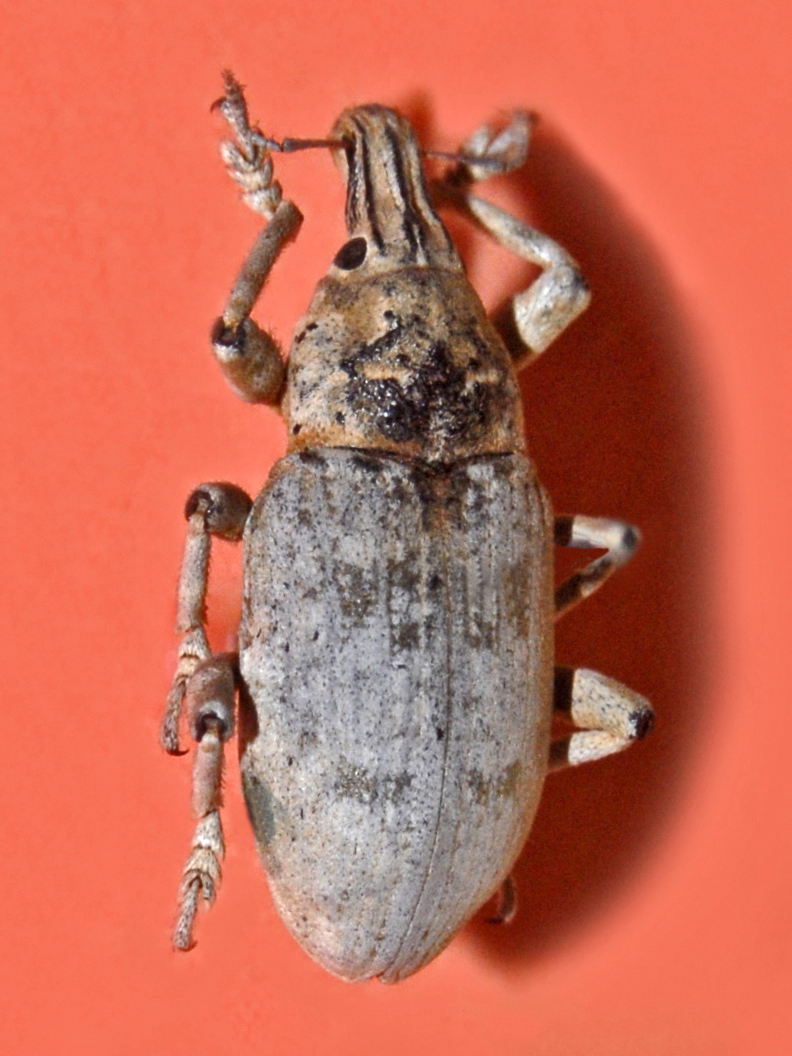
- Museum specimen of Ammocleonus hieroglyphicus

Scientific classification
- Kingdom: Animalia
- Phylum: Arthropoda
- Clade: Pancrustacea
- Class: Insecta
- Order: Coleoptera
- Suborder: Polyphaga
- Infraorder: Cucujiformia
- Superfamily: Curculionoidea
- Family: Curculionidae
- Subfamily: Lixinae
- Tribe: Cleonini
- Genus: Ammocleonus; Bedel, 1907

= Ammocleonus =

Genus of beetles

Ammocleonus is a genus of cylindrical weevils belonging to the family Curculionidae.

== Species ==
- Ammocleonus aschabadensis (Faust, 1884)
- Ammocleonus hieroglyphicus (Olivier, 1807)
