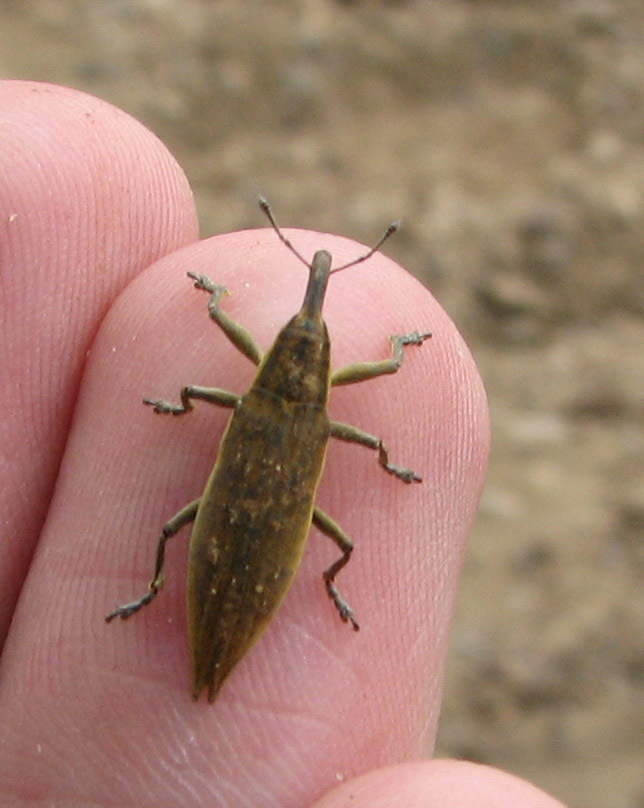
- Lixus iridis

Scientific classification
- Kingdom: Animalia
- Phylum: Arthropoda
- Clade: Pancrustacea
- Class: Insecta
- Order: Coleoptera
- Suborder: Polyphaga
- Infraorder: Cucujiformia
- Superfamily: Curculionoidea
- Family: Curculionidae
- Subfamily: Lixinae; Schönherr, 1823

Tribes
- Cleonini; Lixini; Rhinocyllini

= Lixinae =

Subfamily of beetles

Lixinae is a subfamily of true weevils, included in the Molytinae in many older treatments. They are mainly root feeders, although some develop in flower buds or stems. Several species are used in biological control of invasive weeds, namely knapweeds (Centaurea).

Characteristics include tarsal claws that are fused at the base, and labial palps are short and telescoping. The body is elongate shape, as for some other weevils. Each tibia bears an uncus (small hook) on its distal end. The rostrum is forwardly directed.

== Genesis ==
Bearing in mind modern geographical distribution of Lixinae and its feeding links, it is considered to be that this subfamily appeared in Euroasian lands, when the area of Tethys Ocean demenished. Probably, lixine weevils formed as group in the arid conditions of the deserts of Ancient Mediterranean. From here pra-lixine spread out the over dryland.

== Taxonomy ==
There are three tribes. The largest of these by far are the Cleonini, sometimes ranked as an independent subfamily in the past:

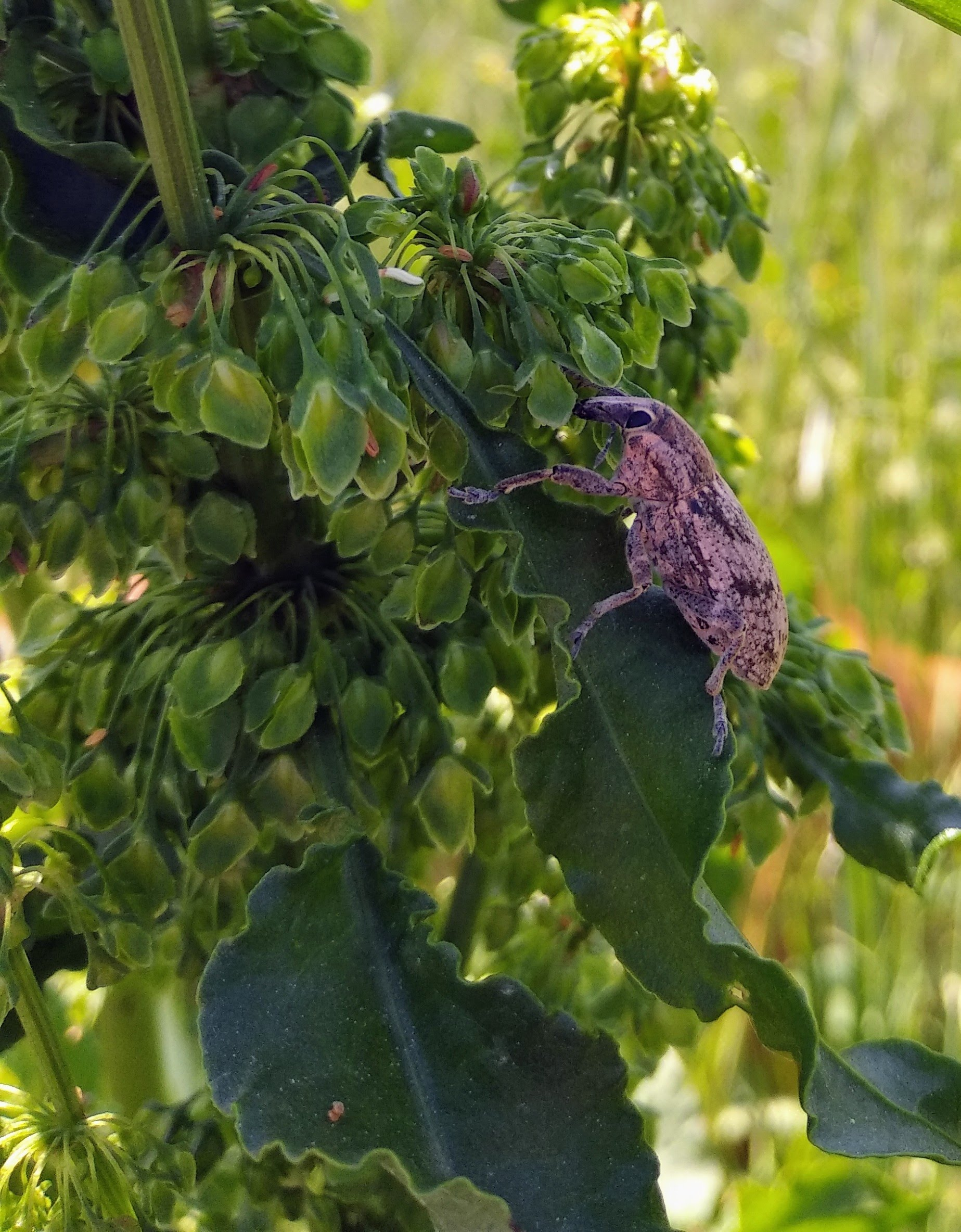
Temnorhinus mendicus

=== Cleonini ===
- Adosomus
- Afghanocleonus
- Ammocleonus
- Aparotopus
- Aplesilus
- Apleurus
- Asinocleonus
- Asproparthenis
- Atactogaster
- Bodemeyeria
- Bothynoderes
- Brachycleonus
- Calodemas
- Centrocleonus
- Chromonotus
- Chromosomus
- Cleonis
- Cleonogonus
- Cleonolithus
- Cnemodontus
- Coniocleonus
- Conorhynchus
- Cosmogaster
- Curculionites
- Cyphocleonus
- Entymetopus
- Eocleonus
- Epexochus
- Ephimeronotus
- Epirrhynchus
- Eumecops
- Eurycleonus
- Georginus
- Gonocleonus
- Hemeurysternus
- Heterocleonus
- Isomerops
- Koenigius
- Leucochromus
- Leucomigus
- Leucophyes
- Liocleonus
- Lixocleonus
- Lixomorphus
- Lixopachys
- Mecaspis
- Menecleonus
- Mesocleonus
- Microcleonus
- Mongolocleonus
- Monolophus
- Neocleonus
- Nomimonyx
- Pachycerus
- Pajnisoodes
- Paraleucochromus
- Pentatropis
- Phaulosomus
- Pleurocleonus
- Pliocleonus
- Porocleonus
- Priorhinus
- Pseudisomerus
- Pseudocleonus
- Pycnodactylopsis
- Resmecaspis
- Rhabdorrhynchus
- Rungsonymus
- Scaphomorphus
- Stephanocleonus
- Surchania
- Temnorhinus
- Terminasiania
- Tetragonothorax
- Trachydemus
- Trichocleonus
- Trichotocleonus
- Whiteheadia
- Xanthochelus
- Xenomacrus
- Zaslavskia

=== Lixini ===
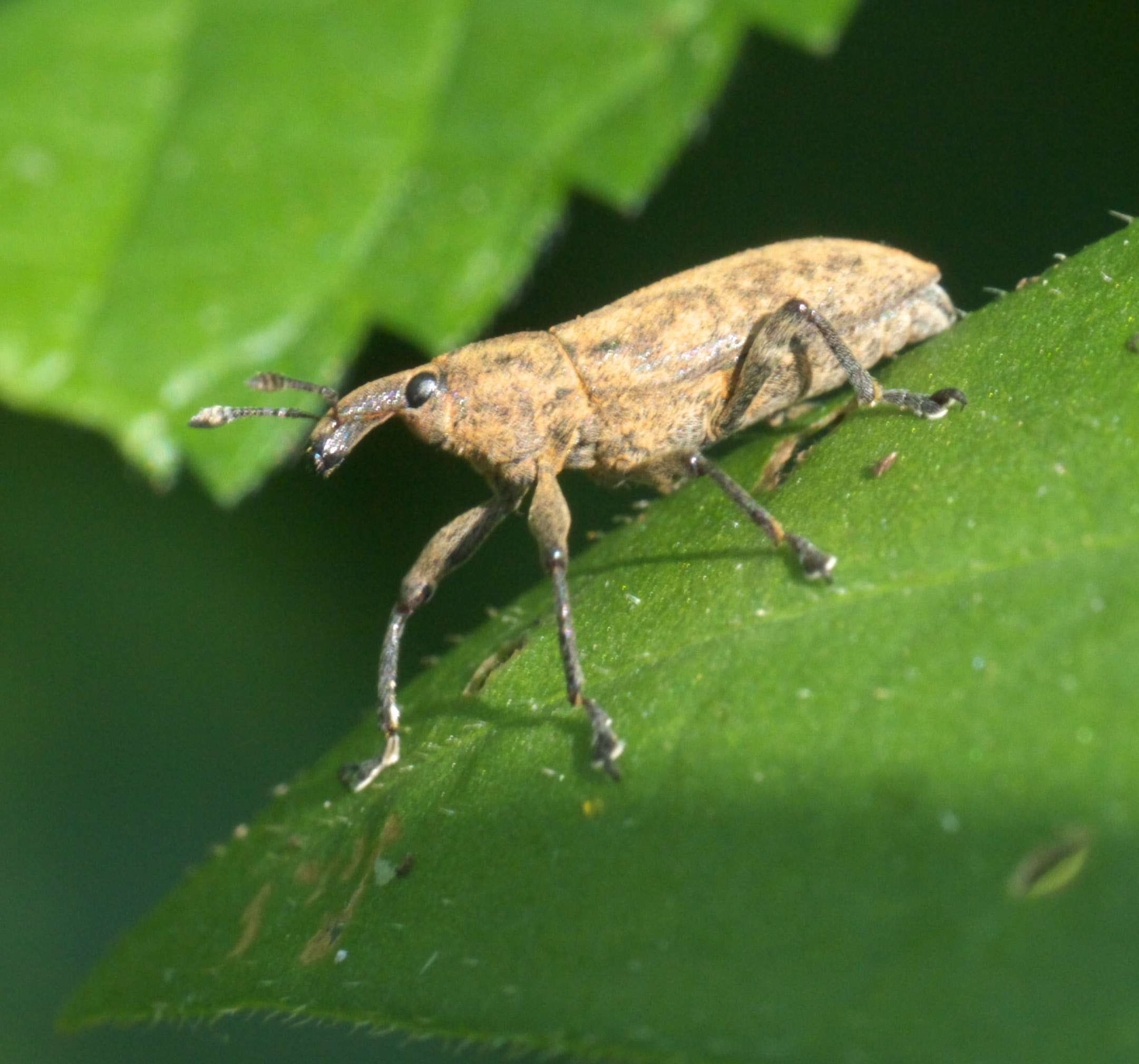
Lixus concavus

- Broconius
- Eugeniodecus
- Eustenopus
- Gasteroclisus
- Hololixus
- Hypolixus
- Ileomus
- Lachnaeus
- Larinus
- Lixus
- Microlarinus
- Microlixus
- Mycotrichus

=== Rhinocyllini ===
- Bangasternus
- Rhinocyllus
