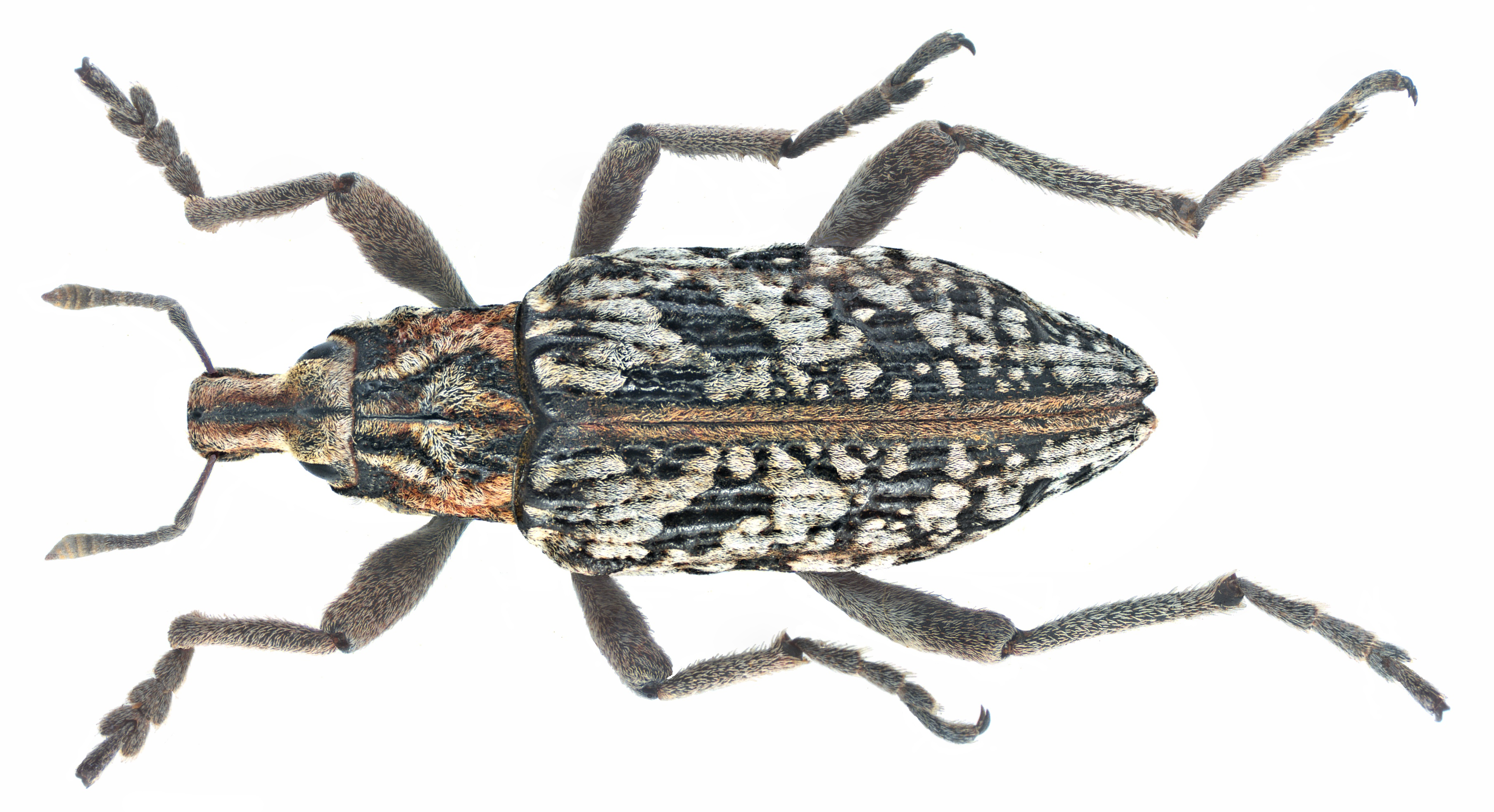
- Coniocleonus nebulosus

Scientific classification
- Kingdom: Animalia
- Phylum: Arthropoda
- Class: Insecta
- Order: Coleoptera
- Suborder: Polyphaga
- Infraorder: Cucujiformia
- Family: Curculionidae
- Subfamily: Lixinae
- Tribe: Cleonini
- Genus: Coniocleonus; Motschulsky, 1860

Synonyms
- Angarocleonus Arzanov, 2006; Augustecleonus Arzanov, 2006; Plagiodesus Chevrolat, 1873

= Coniocleonus =

Genus of beetles

Coniocleonus is a genus of beetles belonging to the family Curculionidae. The genus was first described by Motschulsky in 1860, and the species of this genus are found in Europe.

== Species ==
The following species are recognised in the genus Coniocleonus:

- Coniocleonus alpinus Meregalli, 2013
- Coniocleonus astragali Arzanov, 2006
- Coniocleonus astragali Ter-Minasian & Korotyaev, 1977
- Coniocleonus cicatricosus (D.H.Hoppe, 1795)
- Coniocleonus cineritius Arzanov, 2006
- Coniocleonus excoriatus (L.Gyllenhal, 1834)
- Coniocleonus fastigiatus (Erichson, 1841)
- Coniocleonus graellsi (Chevrolat, 1873)
- Coniocleonus medvedevi Arzanov, 2009)
- Coniocleonus mesopotamicus (A.G.Olivier, 1807)
- Coniocleonus nebulosus (C.Linnaeus, 1758)
- Coniocleonus nigrosuturatus (J.A.E.Goeze, 1777)
- Coniocleonus sejunctus Solari, 1950
- Coniocleonus tabidus (Latreille, 1804)
- Coniocleonus turbatus (Fåhraeus, 1842)
- Coniocleonus uniformis Fuente, 1912
