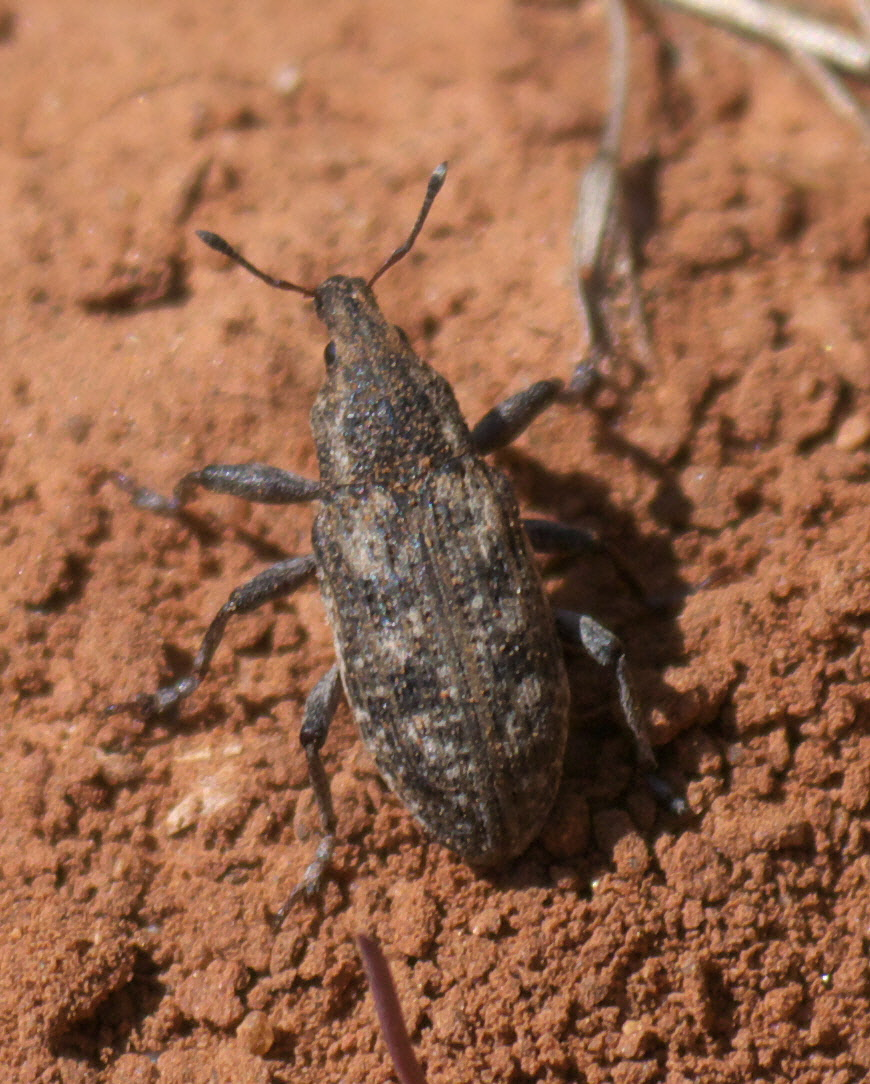

Scientific classification
- Kingdom: Animalia
- Phylum: Arthropoda
- Clade: Pancrustacea
- Class: Insecta
- Order: Coleoptera
- Suborder: Polyphaga
- Infraorder: Cucujiformia
- Superfamily: Curculionoidea
- Family: Curculionidae
- Genus: Apleurus
- Species: A. lutulentus

Binomial name
- Apleurus lutulentus (LeConte, 1859)

Synonyms
- Apleurus fossus Chevrolat, 1873; Cleonus pulvereus LeConte, 1859; Dinocleus bryanti Van Dyke, 1953

= Apleurus lutulentus =

Species of beetle

Apleurus lutulentus is a species of cylindrical weevil in the beetle family Curculionidae. It is found in North America.

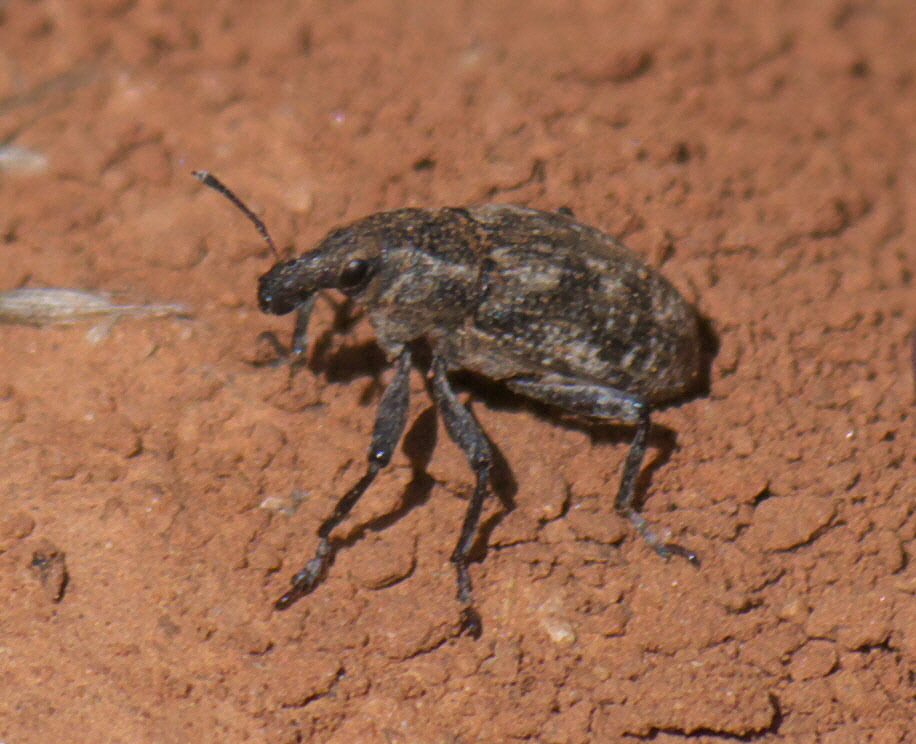
