= Stephanocleonus immaculatus =

Scientific classification
- Kingdom: Animalia
- Phylum: Arthropoda
- Clade: Pancrustacea
- Class: Insecta
- Order: Coleoptera
- Suborder: Polyphaga
- Infraorder: Cucujiformia
- Superfamily: Curculionoidea
- Family: Curculionidae
- Genus: Stephanocleonus
- Species: S. immaculatus

Binomial name
- Stephanocleonus immaculatus Anderson, 1987

Species of beetle

Stephanocleonus immaculatus is a species of cylindrical weevil in the beetle family Curculionidae. It is found in North America.
