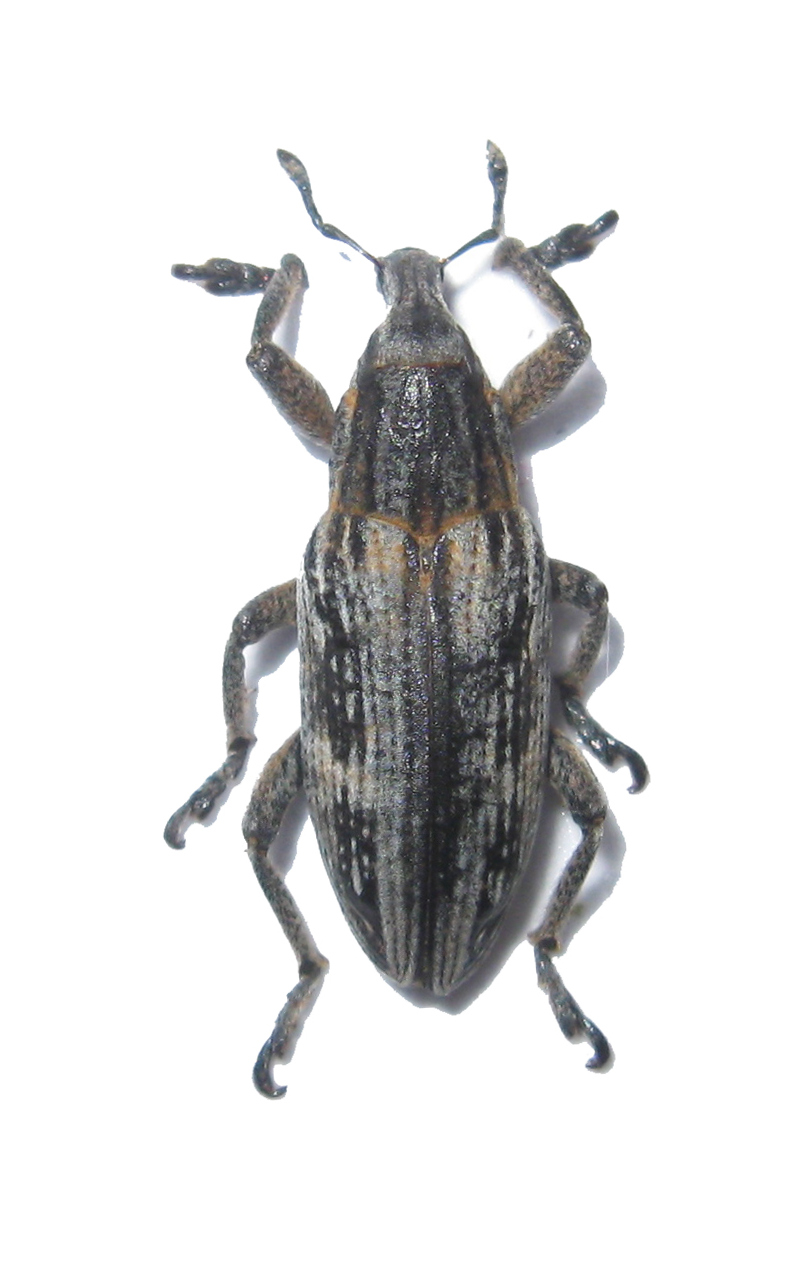

Scientific classification
- Kingdom: Animalia
- Phylum: Arthropoda
- Clade: Pancrustacea
- Class: Insecta
- Order: Coleoptera
- Suborder: Polyphaga
- Infraorder: Cucujiformia
- Superfamily: Curculionoidea
- Family: Curculionidae
- Genus: Mecaspis
- Species: M. alternans

Binomial name
- Mecaspis alternans (Herbst, 1795)

Synonyms
- Cleonus caesus Gyllenhal, 1834; Curculio alternans Herbst, 1795; Mecaspis alternans caesus (Gyllenhal) Hoffmann, 1950; Mecaspis caesus (Gyllenhal) Hustache, 1926

= Mecaspis alternans =

Species of beetle

Mecaspis alternans is a species of cylindrical weevils belonging to the family Curculionidae.

== Description ==
Mecaspis alternans can reach a length of about 13 millimetres (0.51 in) (rostrum excluded). The body is elongate shape, with a dark brown or greyish basic color.

== Distribution ==
This genus is present in most of Europe, in the Near East and in North Africa.
