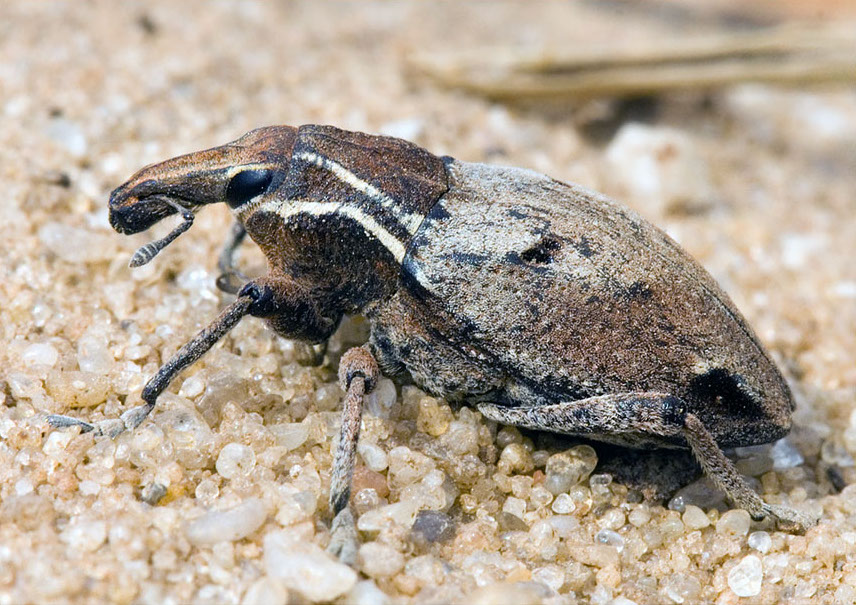
- Stephanocleonus tetragrammus

Scientific classification
- Kingdom: Animalia
- Phylum: Arthropoda
- Clade: Pancrustacea
- Class: Insecta
- Order: Coleoptera
- Suborder: Polyphaga
- Infraorder: Cucujiformia
- Superfamily: Curculionoidea
- Family: Curculionidae
- Subfamily: Lixinae
- Tribe: Cleonini
- Genus: Stephanocleonus; Motschulsky, 1860

= Stephanocleonus =

Genus of beetles

Stephanocleonus is a genus of cylindrical weevils in the beetle family Curculionidae. There are at least 70 described species in Stephanocleonus.

== Species ==
These 70 species belong to the genus Stephanocleonus:

- Stephanocleonus albithorax Ter-Minasian, 1973
- Stephanocleonus albofasciatus Ter-Minasian, 1972
- Stephanocleonus amori Marseul, 1868
- Stephanocleonus amurensis Ter-Minasian, 1977
- Stephanocleonus analis Voss, 1967
- Stephanocleonus approximatus Voss, 1967
- Stephanocleonus argenteus Ter-Minasian, 1989
- Stephanocleonus axillaris Chevrolat, 1873
- Stephanocleonus bogdoensis Ter-Minasian, 1978
- Stephanocleonus changajensis Voss, 1967
- Stephanocleonus chankanus Suvorov, 1915
- Stephanocleonus confusus Anderson, 1987
- Stephanocleonus corpulentus Voss, 1967
- Stephanocleonus cristaticollis (Csiki, 1934)
- Stephanocleonus divisiventris Marshall, 1934
- Stephanocleonus dutensis Ter-Minasian, 1989
- Stephanocleonus eous Ter-Minasian, 1976
- Stephanocleonus eruditus Faust, 1890
- Stephanocleonus fenestratus (Pallas & P.S., 1781)
- Stephanocleonus flaviceps
- Stephanocleonus foveifrons Chevrolat, 1873
- Stephanocleonus gemellus Voss, 1967
- Stephanocleonus giganteus Ter-Minasian, 1970
- Stephanocleonus glaucinus Suvorov, 1912
- Stephanocleonus gobianus Suvorov, 1911
- Stephanocleonus gobiensis Ter-Minasian, 1974
- Stephanocleonus grigorievi Suvorov, 1915
- Stephanocleonus grumi Suvorov, 1911
- Stephanocleonus helenae Ter-Minasian, 1973
- Stephanocleonus hexagraptus Petri, 1915
- Stephanocleonus ignobilis Faust, 1883
- Stephanocleonus immaculatus Anderson, 1987
- Stephanocleonus improcerus Suvorov, 1912
- Stephanocleonus incertus Ter-Minasian, 1972
- Stephanocleonus inopinatus Ter-Minasian, 1972
- Stephanocleonus isochromus Suvorov, 1912
- Stephanocleonus jenisseicus Ter-Minasian, 1978
- Stephanocleonus kerzhneri Ter-Minasian, 1973
- Stephanocleonus kobdoanus Suvorov, 1915
- Stephanocleonus kozlovi Suvorov, 1911
- Stephanocleonus leucostis Suvorov, 1912
- Stephanocleonus lukjanovitshi Ter-Minasian, 1975
- Stephanocleonus macrogrammus Petri, 1914
- Stephanocleonus medvedevi Ter-Minasian, 1989
- Stephanocleonus montanus Ter-Minasian, 1990
- Stephanocleonus muchei Voss, 1967
- Stephanocleonus nassiformis (Goeze & J.A.E., 1777)
- Stephanocleonus nasutus Ballion, 1878
- Stephanocleonus novus Ter-Minasian, 1978
- Stephanocleonus optimus Ter-Minasian, 1978
- Stephanocleonus parallelistriis Ter-Minasian, 1972
- Stephanocleonus parshus Anderson, 1987
- Stephanocleonus plumbeus LeConte, 1876
- Stephanocleonus postfemoralis Ter-Minasian, 1970
- Stephanocleonus posttibialis Voss, 1967
- Stephanocleonus roddi Suvorov, 1912
- Stephanocleonus sejunctus Faust, 1904
- Stephanocleonus shansiensis Ter-Minasian, 1987
- Stephanocleonus sibiricus Ter-Minasian, 1970
- Stephanocleonus similis Ter-Minasian, 1978
- Stephanocleonus sinitsyni Legalov, 1999
- Stephanocleonus stenothorax Anderson, 1987
- Stephanocleonus stratus Faust, 1904
- Stephanocleonus sublaevigatus Ter-Minasian, 1973
- Stephanocleonus suvorovi Legalov, 1999
- Stephanocleonus tetragrammus (Pallas & P.S., 1781)
- Stephanocleonus tibetanus Suvorov, 1915
- Stephanocleonus tshuicus Suvorov, 1912
- Stephanocleonus tuvensis Ter-Minasian, 1978
- Stephanocleonus veretshagini Suvorov, 1912
