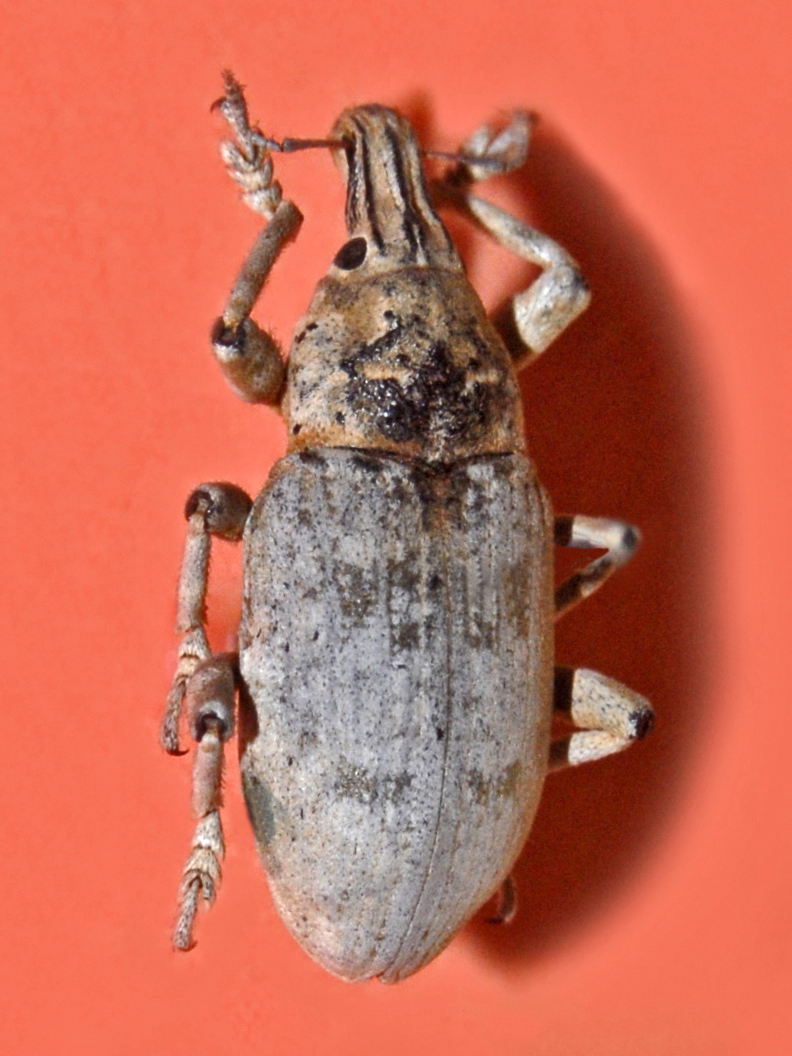
- Museum specimen of Ammocleonus hieroglyphicus

Scientific classification
- Kingdom: Animalia
- Phylum: Arthropoda
- Clade: Pancrustacea
- Class: Insecta
- Order: Coleoptera
- Suborder: Polyphaga
- Infraorder: Cucujiformia
- Superfamily: Curculionoidea
- Family: Curculionidae
- Genus: Ammocleonus
- Species: A. hieroglyphicus

Binomial name
- Ammocleonus hieroglyphicus (Olivier, 1807)

= Ammocleonus hieroglyphicus =

Desert weevil

Species of beetle

Ammocleonus hieroglyphicus, the desert weevil, is a species of cylindrical weevil belonging to the family Curculionidae.

== Description ==
Ammocleonus hieroglyphicus reaches a length of about 15 millimetres (0.59 in).

== Distribution ==
This species is widespread in Africa and Asia.
