= Bothynoderes =

Scientific classification
- Kingdom: Animalia
- Phylum: Arthropoda
- Clade: Pancrustacea
- Class: Insecta
- Order: Coleoptera
- Suborder: Polyphaga
- Infraorder: Cucujiformia
- Superfamily: Curculionoidea
- Family: Curculionidae
- Subfamily: Lixinae
- Tribe: Cleonini
- Genus: Bothynoderes; Schönherr, 1823

Synonyms
- Bothrynoderes Schönherr, 1823

Genus of beetles

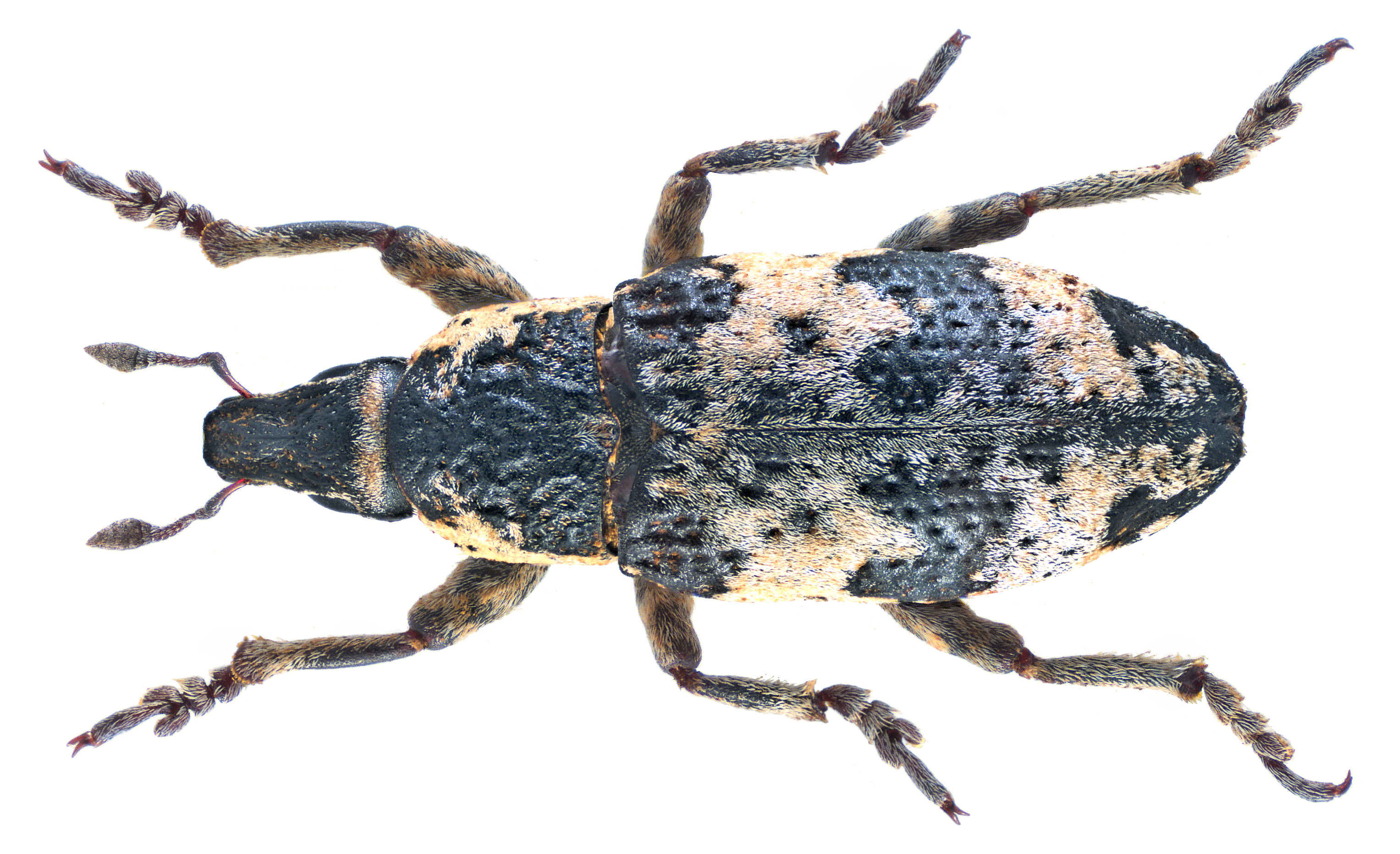
An adult bothynoderes affinis

Bothynoderes is a genus of beetles belonging to the family Curculionidae.

The species of this genus are found in Europe.

Species:

- Bothynoderes affinis (Schrank, 1781)
