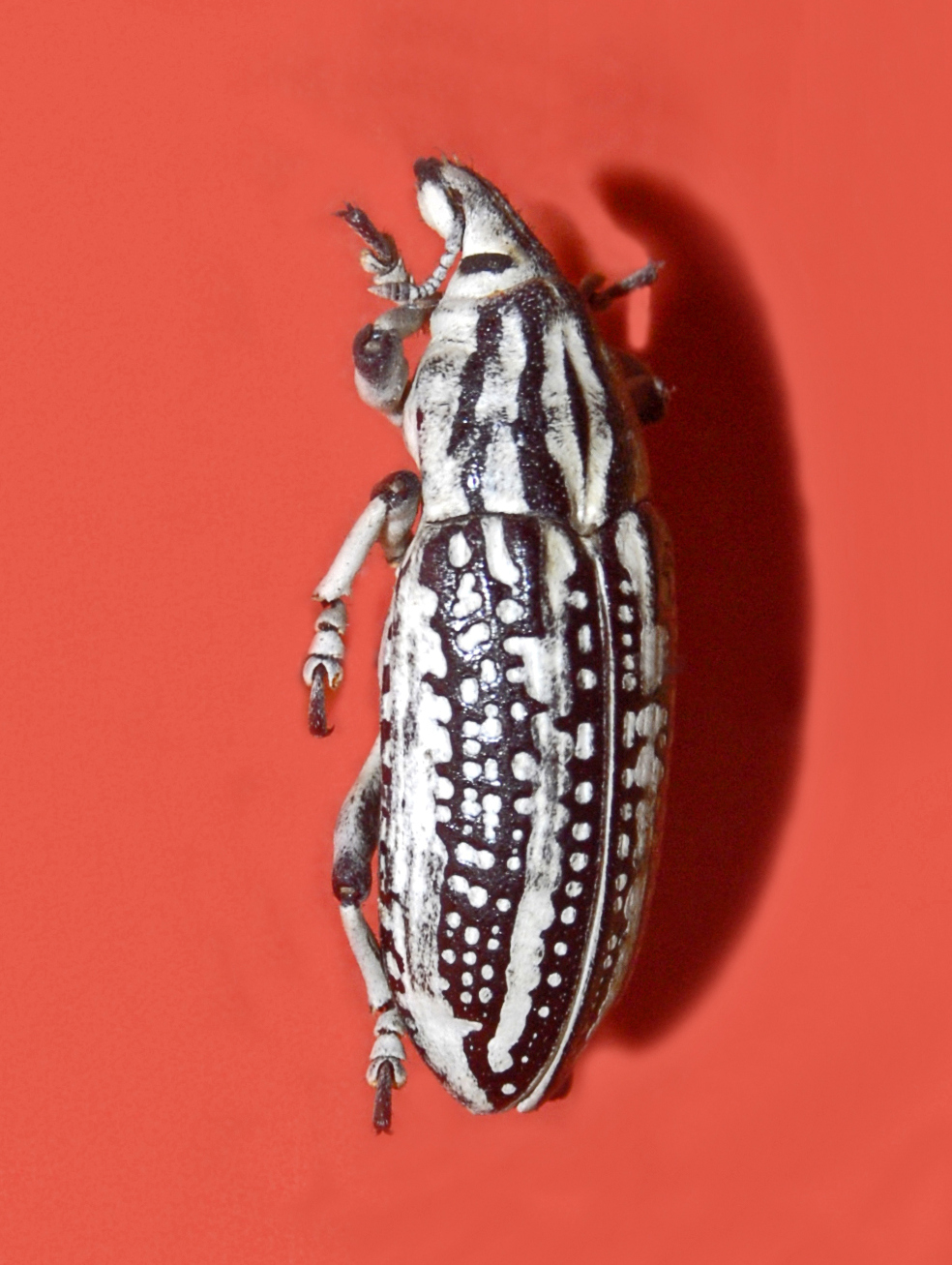
- Mounted specimen of Liocleonus clathratus

Scientific classification
- Kingdom: Animalia
- Phylum: Arthropoda
- Clade: Pancrustacea
- Class: Insecta
- Order: Coleoptera
- Suborder: Polyphaga
- Infraorder: Cucujiformia
- Superfamily: Curculionoidea
- Family: Curculionidae
- Subfamily: Lixinae
- Tribe: Cleonini
- Genus: Liocleonus; Motschulsky, 1860)

= Liocleonus =

Genus of beetles

Liocleonus is a genus of cylindrical weevils belonging to the family Curculionidae.

== Species ==
- Liocleonus amoenus Chevrolat, 1876
- Liocleonus clathratus (Olivier 1807)
- Liocleonus leucomelas Fåhraeus, 1842
- Liocleonus umbrosus Chevrolat, 1873
