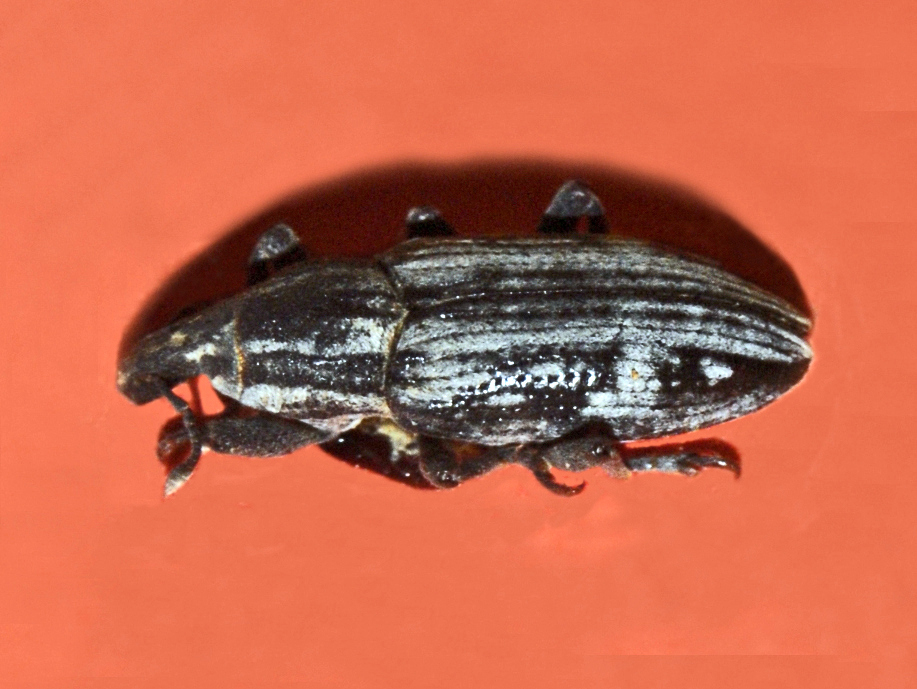
- Museum specimen of Mecaspis alternans

Scientific classification
- Kingdom: Animalia
- Phylum: Arthropoda
- Clade: Pancrustacea
- Class: Insecta
- Order: Coleoptera
- Suborder: Polyphaga
- Infraorder: Cucujiformia
- Superfamily: Curculionoidea
- Family: Curculionidae
- Subfamily: Lixinae
- Tribe: Cleonini
- Genus: Mecaspis; Schönherr, 1823

= Mecaspis =

Genus of beetles

Mecaspis is a genus of cylindrical weevils belonging to the family Curculionidae. This genus is present in most of Europe, in the East Palearctic realm, in the Near East and in North Africa.

== Species ==
- Mecaspis alternans (Herbst, 1795)
- Mecaspis bedeli Faust, 1904
- Mecaspis emarginata (Fabricius, 1787)
- Mecaspis incisurata (Gyllenhal, 1834)
- Mecaspis nana (Gyllenhal, 1834)
- Mecaspis striatella (Fabricius, 1792)
