= Bangasternus orientalis =

Scientific classification
- Kingdom: Animalia
- Phylum: Arthropoda
- Clade: Pancrustacea
- Class: Insecta
- Order: Coleoptera
- Suborder: Polyphaga
- Infraorder: Cucujiformia
- Superfamily: Curculionoidea
- Family: Curculionidae
- Genus: Bangasternus
- Species: B. orientalis

Binomial name
- Bangasternus orientalis Capiomont, 1873

Species of beetle

Bangasternus orientalis is a species of true weevil known as the yellow starthistle bud weevil. It is used as an agent of biological pest control against the noxious weed yellow starthistle (Centaurea solstitialis).

The adult weevil is brown with a thin coat of light mottled hairs. It is about 6 millimeters long. The female lays up to 470 eggs near the flower heads of yellow starthistle and glues them with a dark-colored mucilage. When the larva emerges from its egg, it tunnels up into the flower head, where it consumes the flower parts and developing seeds. It then constructs a sort of cocoon from the remnants of the flower and seed parts and pupates there. Most of the damage to the plant is done by the larva, which destroys 50-60% of the seeds in a given flower head. It is host-specific, attacking only yellow starthistle and sometimes purple starthistle (C. calcitrapa); it does not attack any native plants.

This weevil is native to southern Europe and the Mediterranean. It was first released as a biocontrol agent in the United States in 1985. It is now established throughout the western United States, wherever yellow starthistle is found. It helps prevent the spread of the weed, but it is not as common or effective as other yellow starthistle biocontrol agents.

== Life cycle ==
Overwintering adults appear on plants in the spring through early summer. Eggs are laid on young leaves under developing flower heads. Larvae hatch, tunnel into the stem, and ultimately into the flower head, where they feed on young seeds. Pupation occurs within the seed heads. New adults then exit the plant to overwinter.

== Habitat ==
Spotted and diffuse knapweed are weed species that can be found throughout the northern tier of states and as far south as Nebraska and Virginia. These highly competitive weed species favor and establish quickly on disturbed sites and overgrazed rangeland. Both weeds will invade well established grassland communities and out compete the native vegetation. The release of B. fausti is part of a program to introduce a complex of spotted and diffuse knapweed enemies to help control these weeds.

== Field identification ==
Several insects have been released for control of yellow starthistle. B. orientalis can be distinguished from the other seed head beetles, Eustenopus villosus and Larinus curtus, by its much shorter and blunt snout. B. orientalis also has much shorter body hairs than E. villosus.

== Availability ==
This beetle is readily available wherever yellow starthistle is found. Adults can be collected from spring through early summer. However, because its impacts are usually secondary relative to E. villosus, and because it is likely already present at most starthistle sites, redistribution may be unnecessary.
