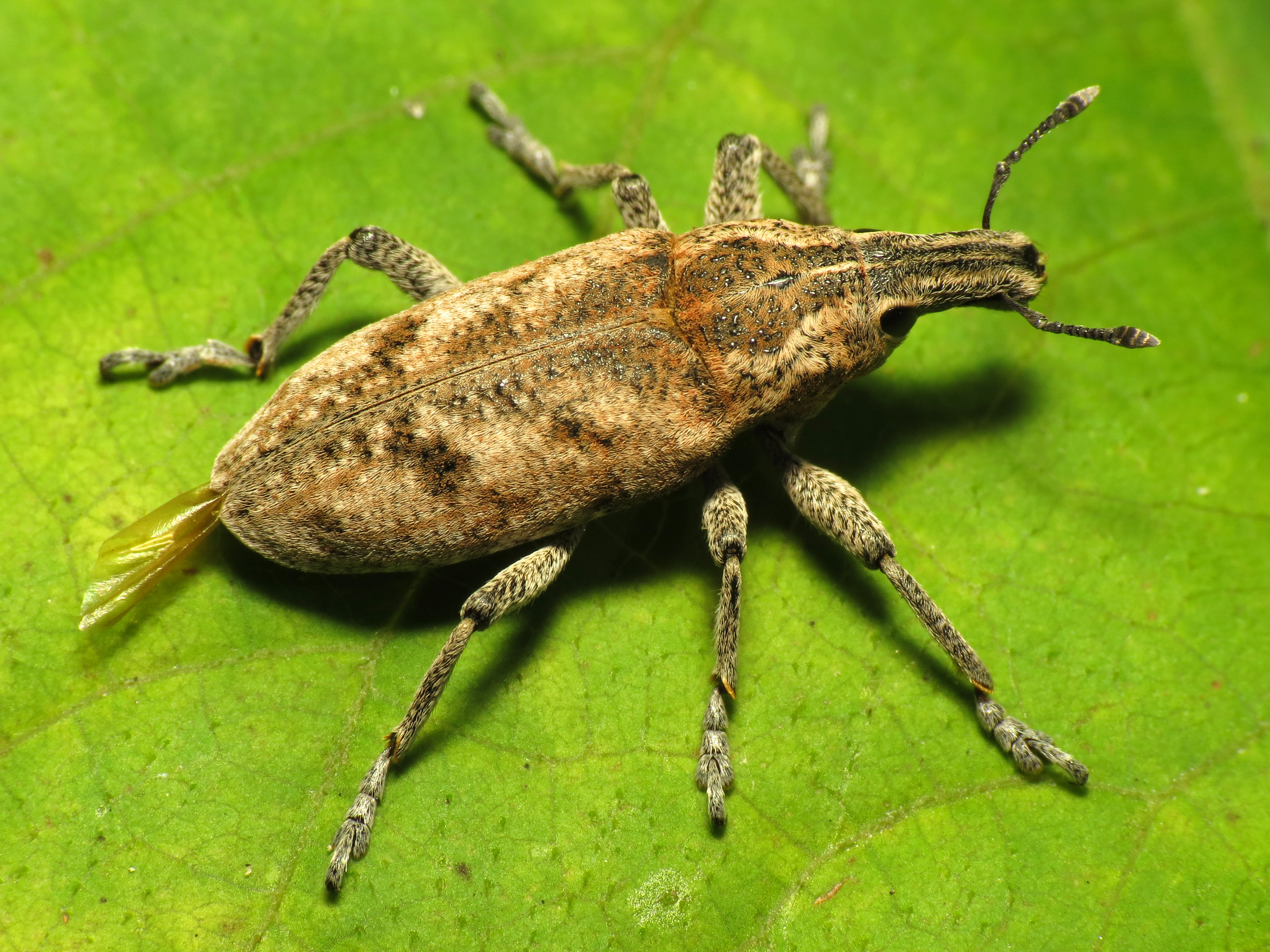

Scientific classification
- Kingdom: Animalia
- Phylum: Arthropoda
- Clade: Pancrustacea
- Class: Insecta
- Order: Coleoptera
- Suborder: Polyphaga
- Infraorder: Cucujiformia
- Superfamily: Curculionoidea
- Family: Curculionidae
- Genus: Cleonis
- Species: C. pigra

Binomial name
- Cleonis pigra (Scopoli, 1763)

Synonyms
- Cleonus piger Scopoli, 1763; Curculio centaureae Allioni, 1766; Curculio sulcirostris Linnaeus, 1767; Curculio transversofasciatus Goeze, 1777; Cleonus indicus Fahraeus, 1842; Bothynoderes caucasicus Chevrolat, 1873

= Cleonis pigra =

Species of beetle

Cleonis pigra, the sluggish weevil or large thistle weevil, is a weevil species recorded in Britain and native to Eurasia. It was introduced into North America to help control creeping thistle. This species develops in the roots of plants in the family Asteraceae.

It appears spelled different ways in the literature: Cleonis piger, Cleonus piger, Cleonus pigra, but the correct spelling under ICZN Article 31.2 is Cleonis pigra

It is identified by double V-pattern elytra and a rostrum with three sulci.

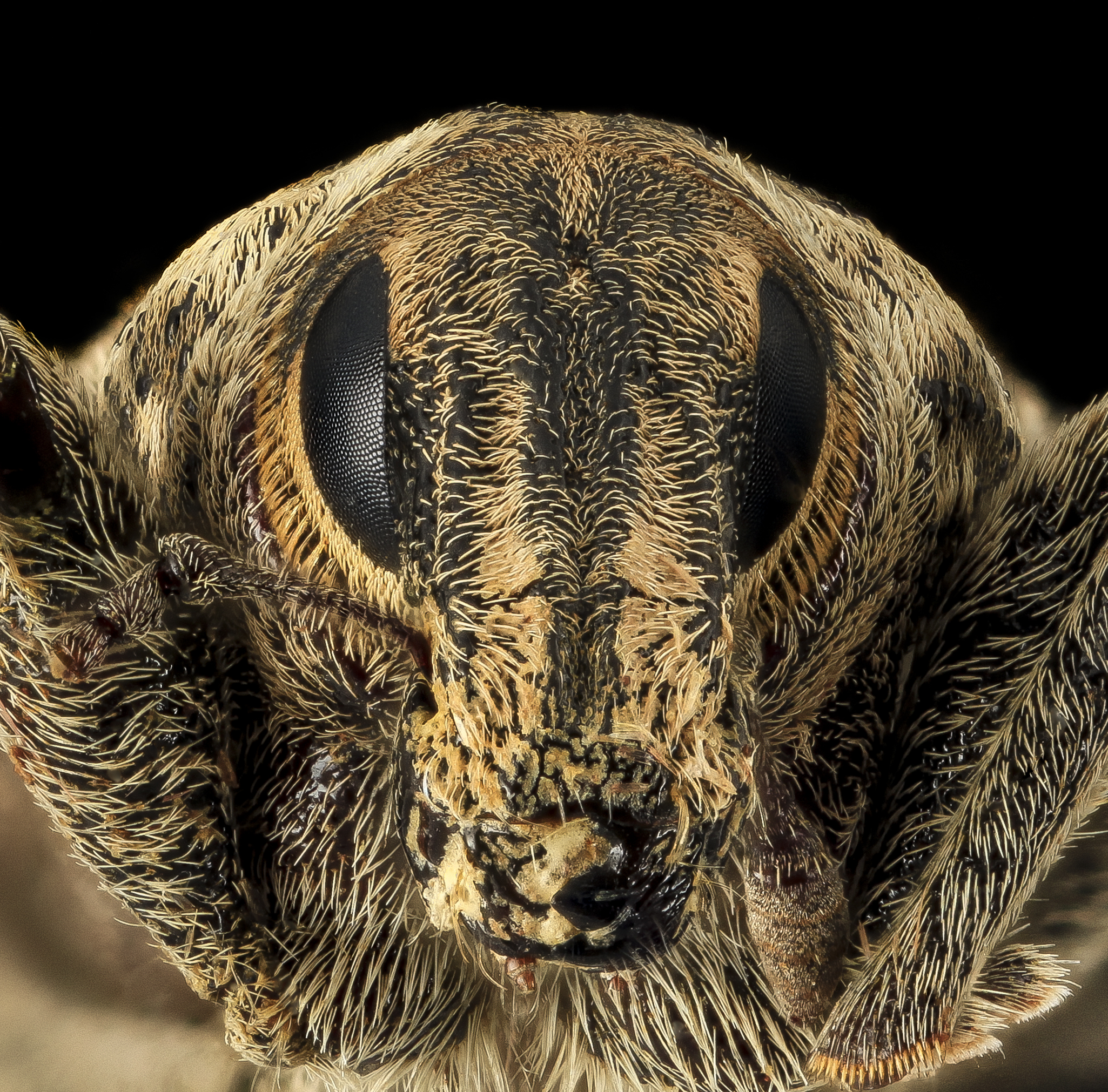
close-up face
