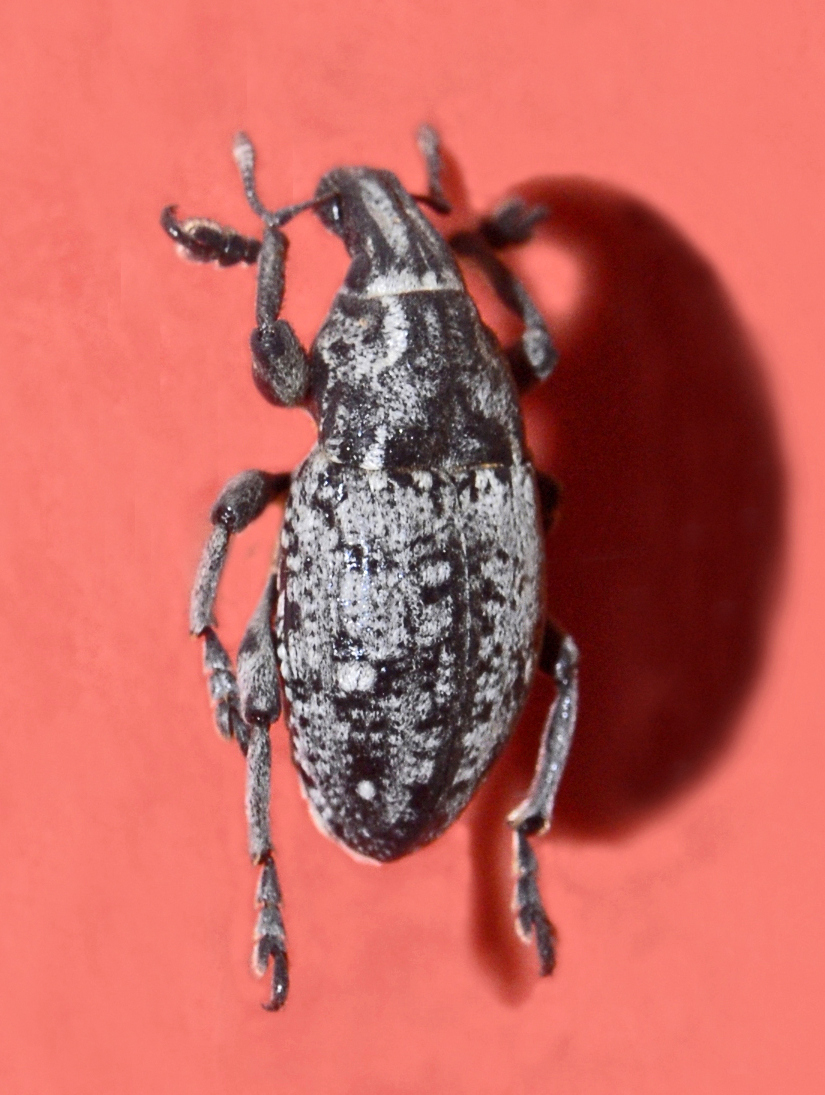
- Museum specimen of Leucophyes pedestris

Scientific classification
- Kingdom: Animalia
- Phylum: Arthropoda
- Clade: Pancrustacea
- Class: Insecta
- Order: Coleoptera
- Suborder: Polyphaga
- Infraorder: Cucujiformia
- Superfamily: Curculionoidea
- Family: Curculionidae
- Subfamily: Lixinae
- Tribe: Cleonini
- Genus: Leucophyes; Marshall, 1946

Synonyms
- Leucosomus Motschulsky, 1860

= Leucophyes =

Genus of beetles

Leucophyes is a genus of cylindrical weevils belonging to the family Curculionidae.

== Species ==
- Leucophyes martorellii (Fairmaire, 1879)
- Leucophyes occidentalis (Dieckmann, 1982)
- Leucophyes pedestris (Poda, 1761)

== Distribution and habitat ==
This species is present in most of Europe, in the Near East and in North Africa.
