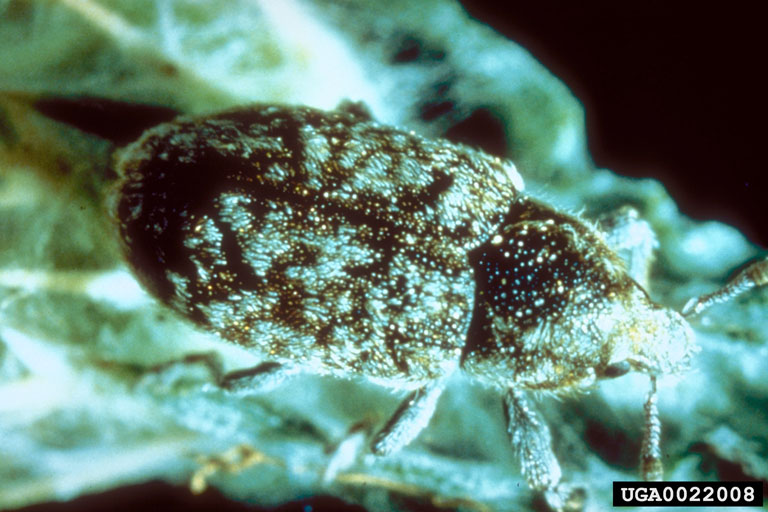
- Bangasternus fausti

Scientific classification
- Kingdom: Animalia
- Phylum: Arthropoda
- Clade: Pancrustacea
- Class: Insecta
- Order: Coleoptera
- Suborder: Polyphaga
- Infraorder: Cucujiformia
- Superfamily: Curculionoidea
- Family: Curculionidae
- Subfamily: Lixinae
- Tribe: Rhinocyllini
- Genus: Bangasternus; M des Gozis, 1882

Synonyms
- Coelostethus Capiomont, 1873; Coelosthetus Stein & Weise, 1877

= Bangasternus =

Genus of weevils

Bangasternus is a genus of weevils in the tribe Rhinocyllini, erected by Maurice des Gozis in 1882. Species have been recorded from southern Europe and western North America, where species have been introduced as biological pest control agents against noxious weeds.

== Species ==
The Global Biodiversity Information Facility lists:

1. Bangasternus antiodontalgicus Redtenbacher, 1874
2. Bangasternus araxidis Petri, 1907
3. Bangasternus araxis Reitter, 1895
4. Bangasternus diecki Capiomont, 1873
5. Bangasternus dunni Colonnelli in Colonnelli & Whitehead, 1990
6. Bangasternus fausti Reitter, 1890
7. Bangasternus hispanicus Capiomont, 1873
8. Bangasternus orientalis Capiomont, 1873
9. Bangasternus planifrons Brullé, 1832
10. Bangasternus provincialis Fairmaire, 1863
11. Bangasternus remaudierei Gültekin, 2013
12. Bangasternus siculus Capiomont, 1873
13. Bangasternus smyrnensis Capiomont, 1873
14. Bangasternus syriacus Stierlin, 1888
15. Bangasternus villosus Capiomont, 1873
