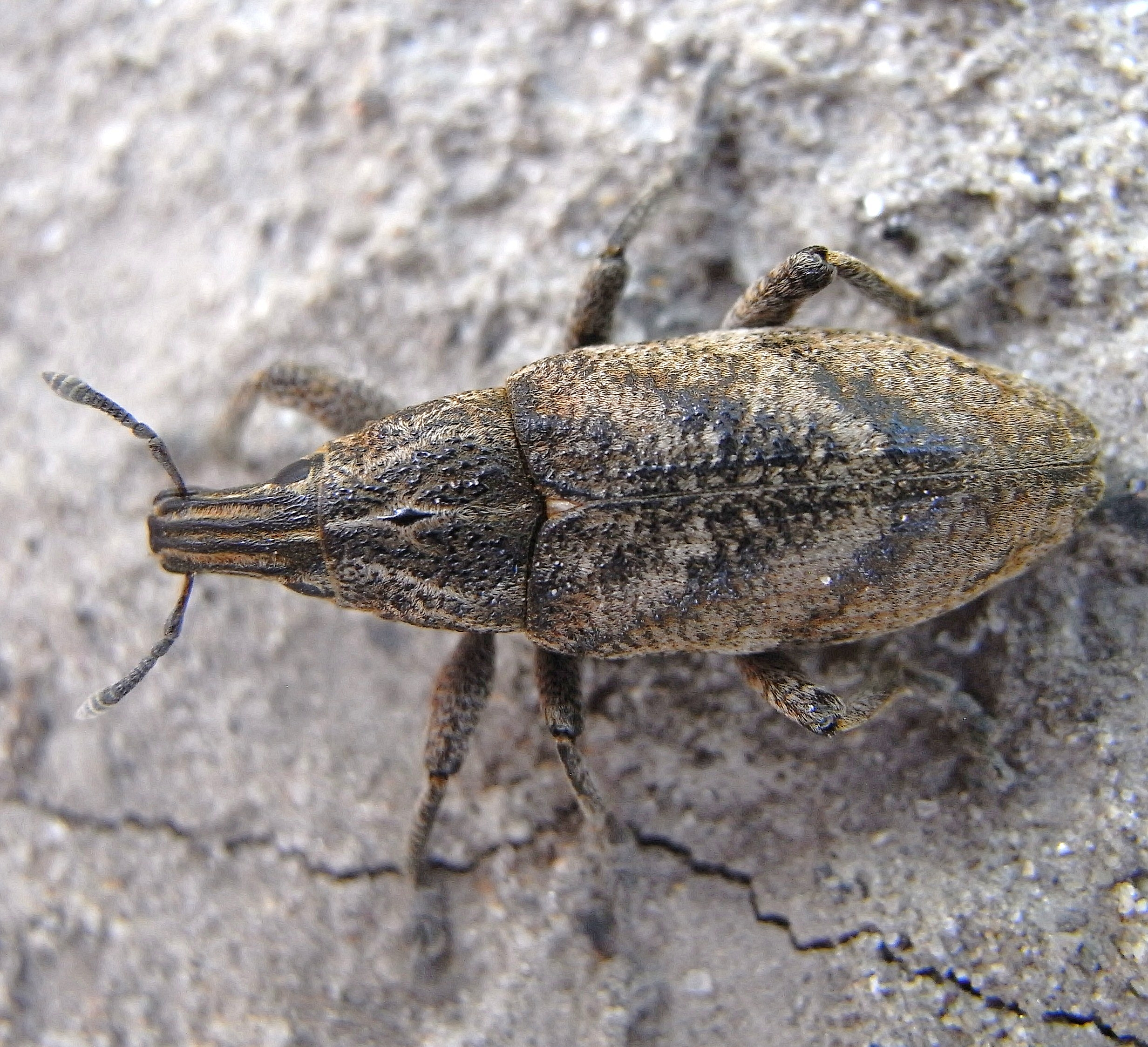
- Cleonis pigra

Scientific classification
- Kingdom: Animalia
- Phylum: Arthropoda
- Clade: Pancrustacea
- Class: Insecta
- Order: Coleoptera
- Suborder: Polyphaga
- Infraorder: Cucujiformia
- Superfamily: Curculionoidea
- Family: Curculionidae
- Subfamily: Lixinae
- Tribe: Cleonini
- Genus: Cleonis; Dejean, 1821

Synonyms
- Geomorphus Schönherr, 1823; Cleonus Schönherr, 1826; Xerobia Gistel, 1856

= Cleonis =

Genus of beetles

Cleonis is a genus of cylindrical weevils in the beetle family Curculionidae. There are at least 120 described species in Cleonis.

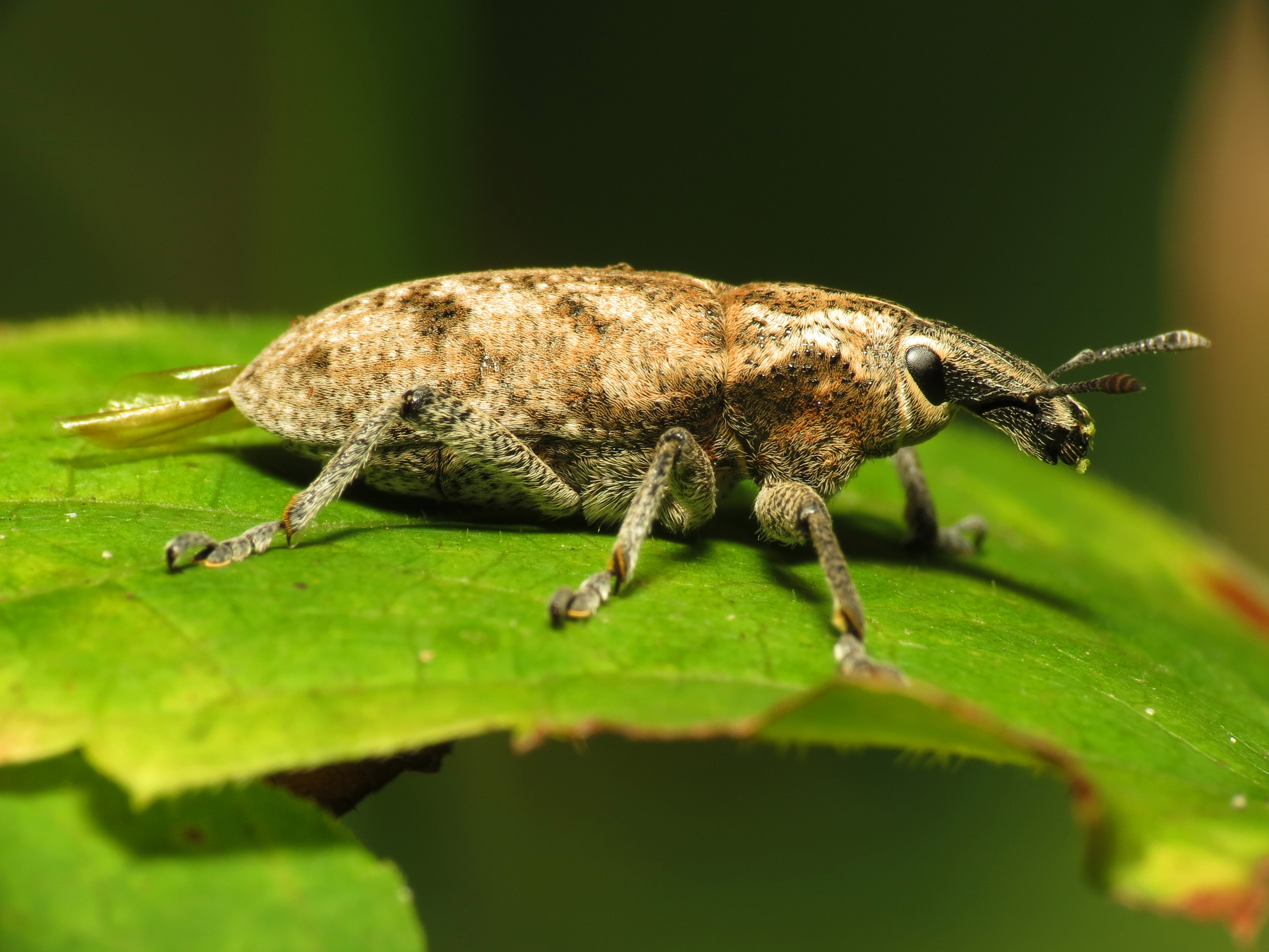
Cleonis pigra

== See also ==
- List of Cleonis species
