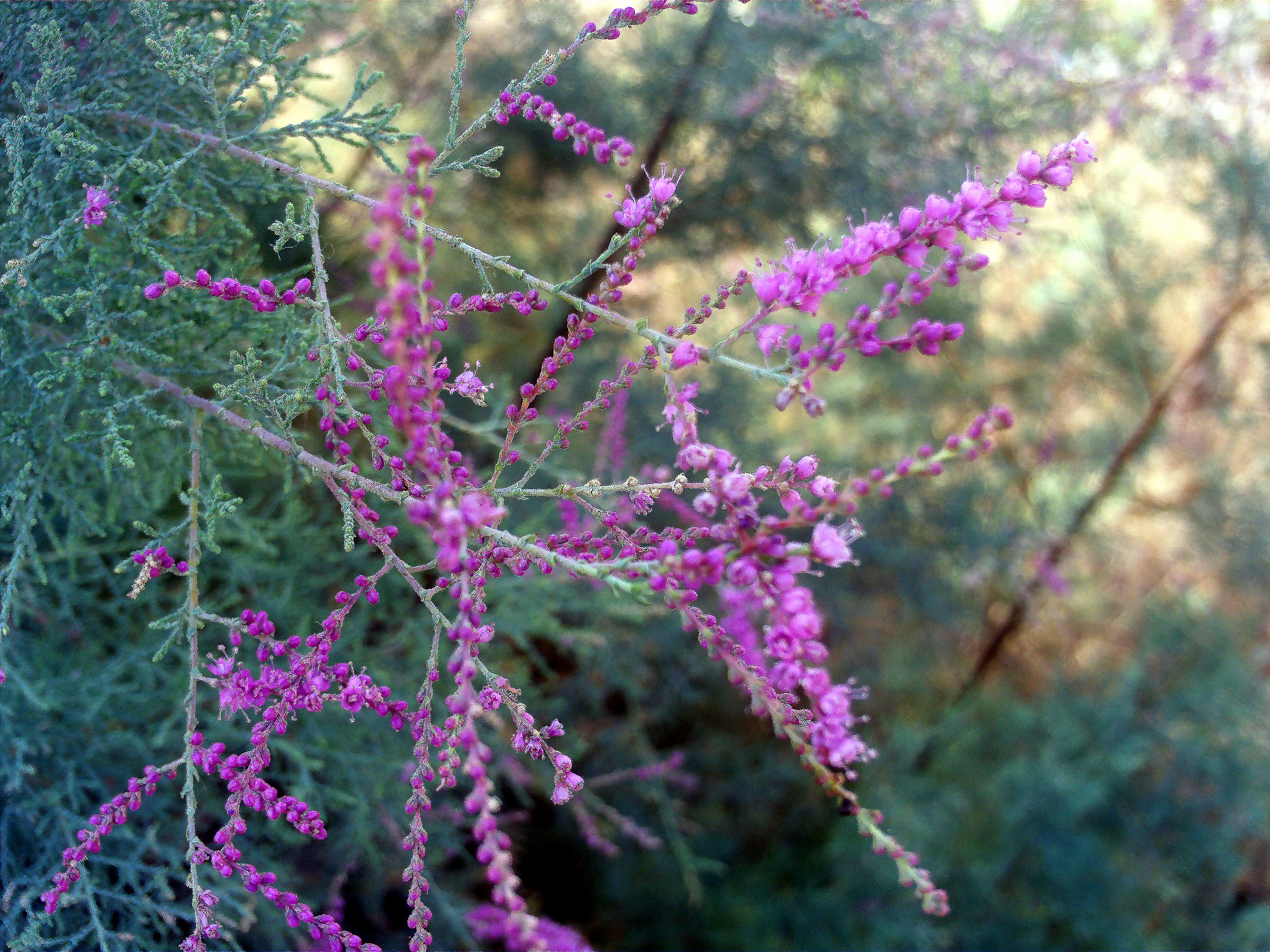

Conservation status
- Least Concern (IUCN 3.1)

Scientific classification
- Kingdom: Plantae
- Clade: Tracheophytes
- Clade: Angiosperms
- Clade: Eudicots
- Order: Caryophyllales
- Family: Tamaricaceae
- Genus: Tamarix
- Species: T. parviflora

Binomial name
- Tamarix parviflora DC.

Synonyms
- Tamarix cretica

= Tamarix parviflora =

Smallflower tamarisk

Species of flowering plant

Tamarix parviflora is a species of tamarisk known by the common name smallflower tamarisk.

It is native to south-eastern Europe (Albania, East Aegean Islands, Greece, Crete and the former Yugoslavia) and to Turkey. It has been introduced elsewhere, in places such as; Algeria, Austria, Cape Provinces, Corsica, Italy, Libya, Mexico, Pakistan, Sicily, Spain, West Himalayas and western North America (Arizona, California, Colorado, Illinois, Kansas, Kentucky, Mississippi, Nevada, New Mexico, New York, North Carolina, Oklahoma, Oregon and Texas), where it is an invasive introduced species.

It easily inhabits moist habitat, especially in saline soils. It is a shrub or tree growing up to about 5 meters tall. The branching twigs are covered in tiny linear leaves no more than 2 or 3 millimetres long. The inflorescence is a dense spike with flowers 1 to 4 centimeters long. Each tiny flower has four pink petals.

It was first published and described by Augustin Pyramus de Candolle in Prodr. vol.3 on page 97 in 1828.
