= Working animal =

Domesticated animals for assisting people

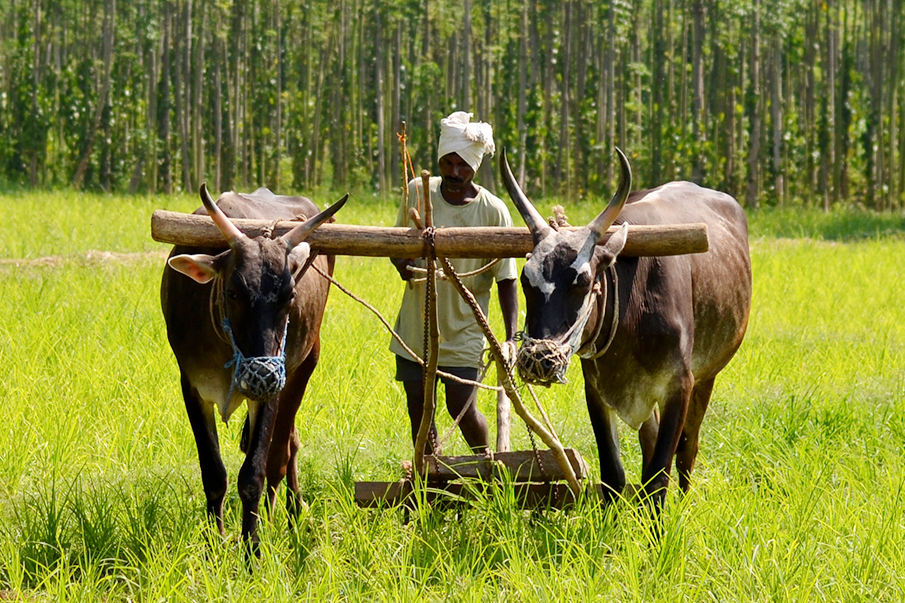
Traditional farming methods using oxen

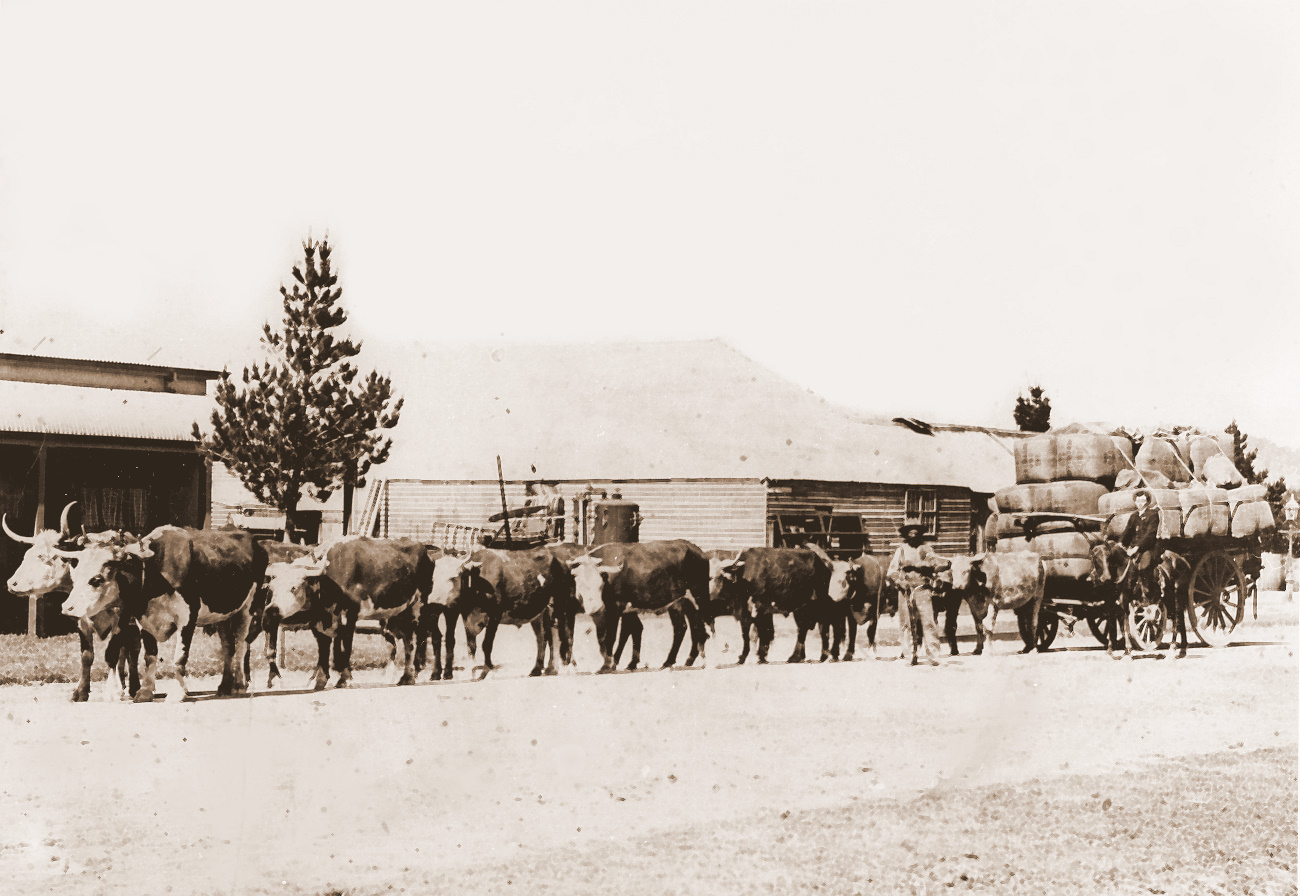
A bullock team hauling wool in New South Wales

A working animal is an animal, usually domesticated, that is kept by humans and trained to perform tasks. Some are used for their physical strength (e.g. oxen and draft horses) or for transportation (e.g. riding horses and camels), while others are service animals trained to execute certain specialized tasks (e.g. hunting and guide dogs, messenger pigeons, and fishing cormorants). They may also be used for milking or herding. Some, at the end of their working lives, may also be used for meat or leather.

The history of working animals may predate agriculture as dogs were used by hunter-gatherer ancestors; around the world, millions of animals work in relationship with their owners. Domesticated species are often bred for different uses and conditions, especially horses and working dogs. Working animals are usually raised on farms, though some are still captured from the wild, such as dolphins and some Asian elephants.

People have found uses for a wide variety of abilities in animals, and even industrialized societies use many animals for work. People use the strength of horses, elephants, and oxen to pull carts and move loads. Police forces use dogs for finding illegal substances and assisting in apprehending wanted persons, others use dogs to find game or search for missing or trapped people. People use various animals—camels, donkeys, horses, dogs, etc.—for transport, either for riding or to pull wagons and sleds. Other animals, including dogs and monkeys, help disabled people.

On rare occasions, wild animals are not only tamed, but trained to perform work—though often solely for novelty or entertainment, as such animals tend to lack the trustworthiness and mild temper of true domesticated working animals. Conversely, not all domesticated animals are working animals. For example, while cats may catch mice, it is an instinctive behavior, not one that can be trained by human intervention. Other domesticated animals, such as sheep or rabbits, may have agricultural uses for meat, hides and wool, but are not suitable for work. Finally, small domestic pets, such as most small birds (other than certain types of pigeon) are generally incapable of performing work other than providing companionship.

== Roles and specializations ==
=== Transportation ===
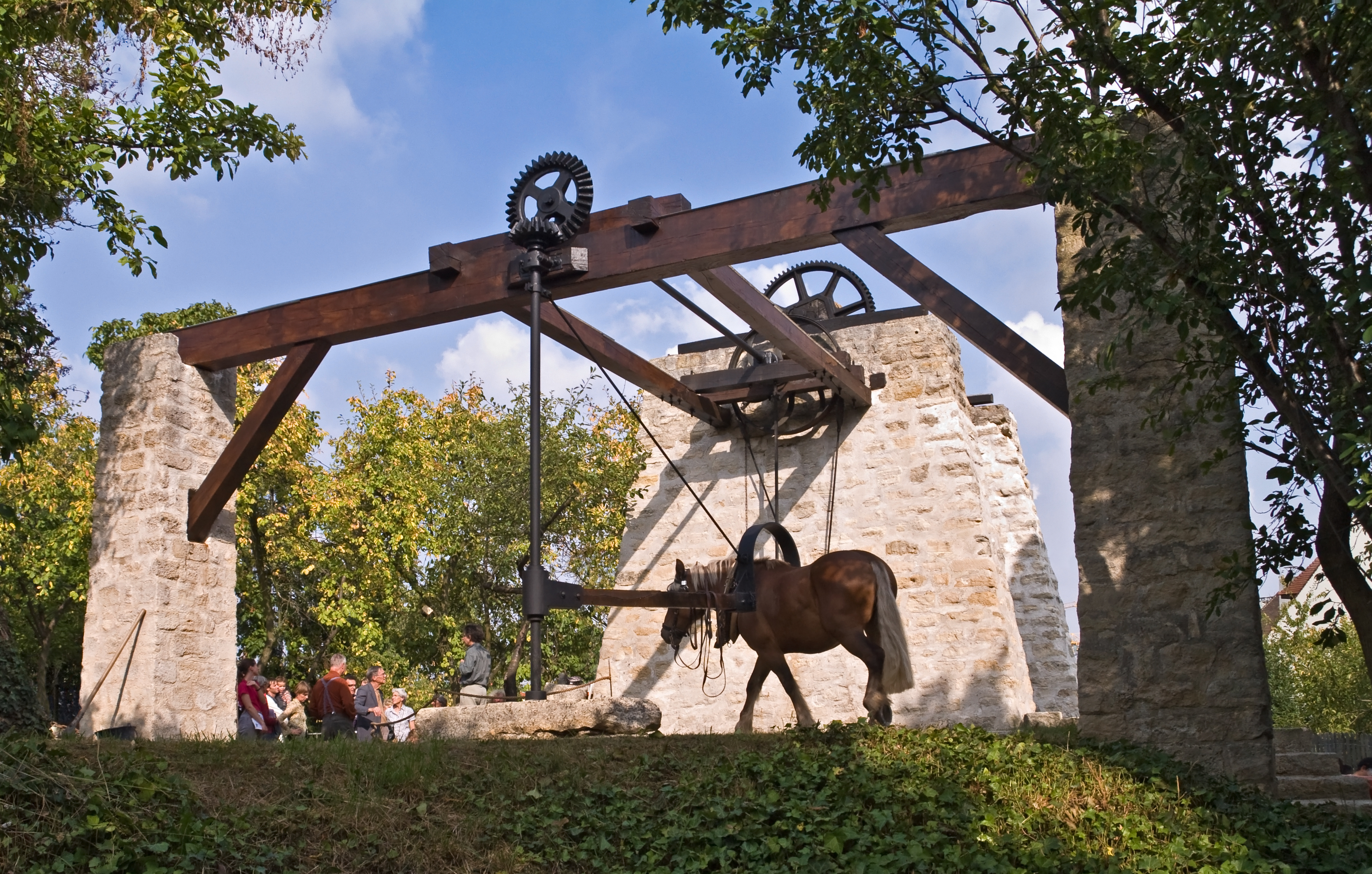
The horse-drawn winch of a former limestone quarry (France)

Some animals are used due to sheer physical strength in tasks such as ploughing or logging. Such animals are grouped as a draught or draft animals. Others may be used as pack animals, for animal-powered transport, the movement of people and goods. Together, these are sometimes called beasts of burden. Some animals are ridden by people on their backs and are known as mounts. Alternatively, one or more animals in harness may be used to pull vehicles.

==== Riding animals or mounts ====
Riding animals are animals that people use as mounts in order to perform tasks such as traversing across long distances or over rugged terrain, hunting on horseback or with some other riding animal, patrolling around rural and/or wilderness areas, rounding up and/or herding livestock or even for recreational enjoyment. They mainly include equines such as horses, donkeys, and mules; bovines such as cattle, water buffalo, and yak. In some places, elephants, llamas and camels are also used. Dromedary camels are in arid areas of Australia, North Africa and the Middle East; the less common Bactrian camel inhabits central and East Asia; both are used as working animals. On occasion, reindeer, though usually driven, may be ridden.

Certain wild animals have been tamed and used for riding, usually for novelty purposes, including the zebra and the ostrich. Some mythical creatures are believed to act as divine mounts, such as garuda in Hinduism (See vahana for divine mounts in Hinduism) and the winged horse Pegasus in Greek mythology.

==== Pack animals ====
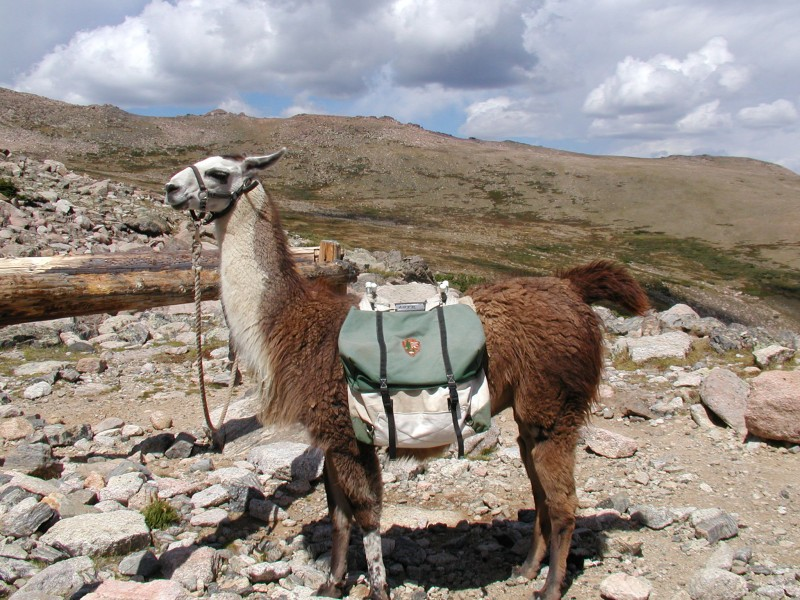
A pack llama

Pack animals may be of the same species as mounts or harness animals, though animals such as horses (especially packhorses), mules, donkeys, reindeer and both types of camel may have individual bloodlines or breeds that have been selectively bred for packing. Additional species are only used to carry loads, including llamas in the Andes.

Domesticated cattle and yaks are also used as pack animals. Other species used to carry cargo include dogs and pack goats.

==== Draft animals ====
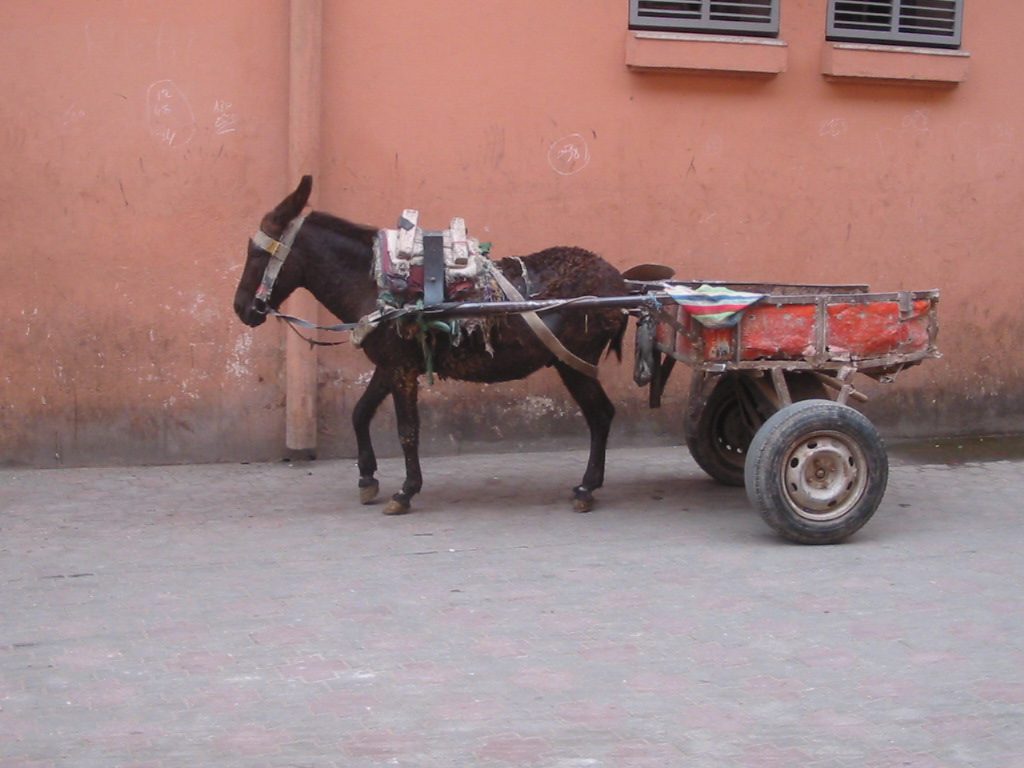
Donkey used to pull a wheeled vehicle in Morocco

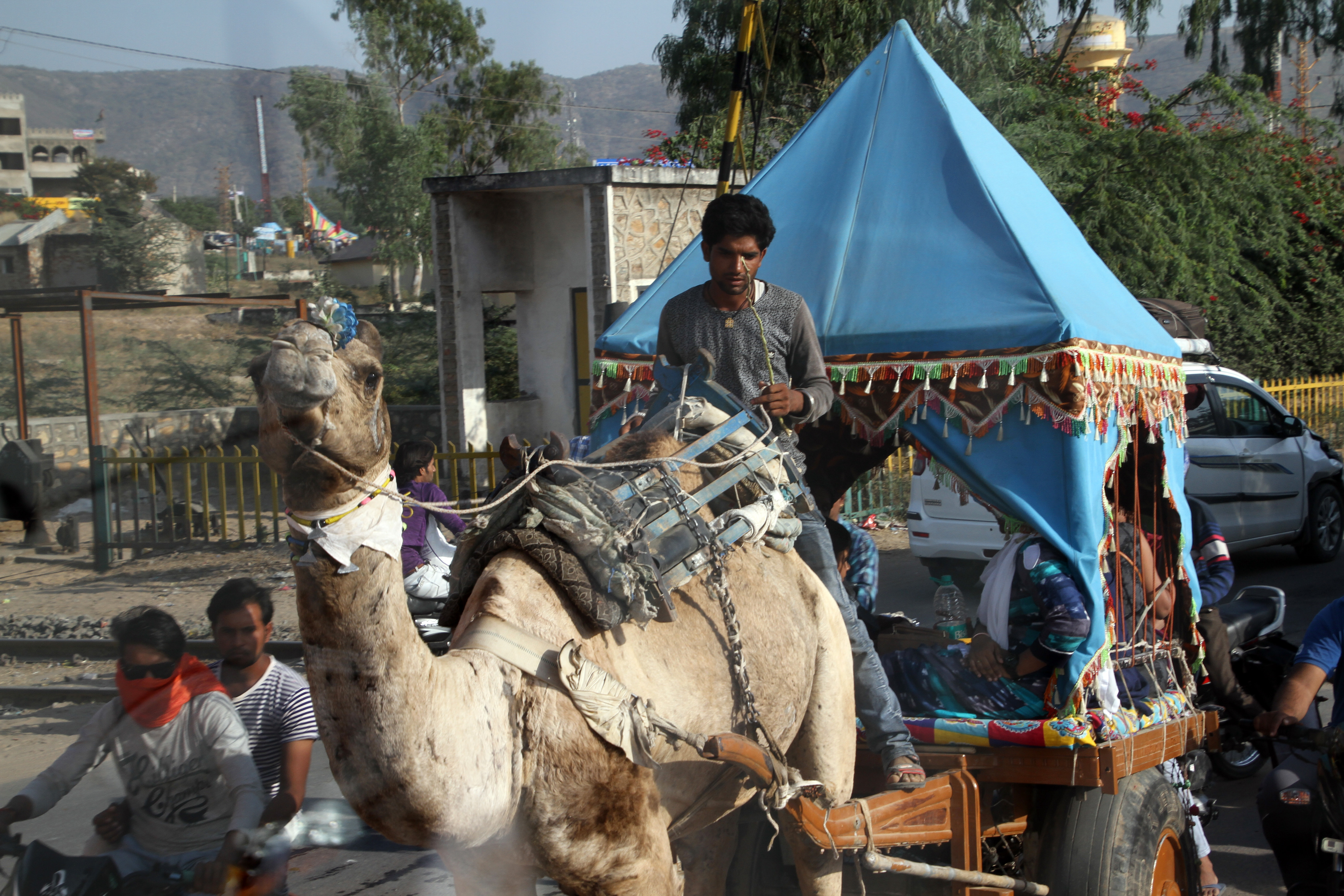
Camel pulling a coach in Rajasthan

An intermediate use is as draft animals, harnessed singly or in teams, to pull sleds, wheeled vehicles or ploughs.

- Oxen are slow but strong, and have been used in a yoke since ancient times: the earliest surviving vehicle, Puabi's Sumerian sledge, was ox-drawn; an acre was originally defined as the area a span of oxen could plow in a day. The domestic water buffalo and carabao, pull wagons and ploughs in Southeast Asia and the Philippines.
- Draught or draft horses are commonly used in harness for heavy work. Several breeds of medium-weight horses are used to pull lighter wheeled carts, carriages and buggies when a certain amount of speed or style is desirable.
- Mules are considered tough and strong, with harness capacity dependent on the type of horse mare used to produce the mule foal. Because they are a hybrid animal and usually are infertile, separate breeding programs must also be maintained.
- Ponies and donkeys are often used to pull carts and small wagons. Historically, ponies were commonly used in mining to pull ore carts.
- Dogs are used for pulling light carts or, particularly, sleds (e.g. sled dogs such as huskies) for both recreation and working purposes.
- Goats also can perform light harness work in front of carts.
- Reindeer are used in the Arctic and sub-Arctic Nordic countries and Siberia. During World War II, the Red Army deployed deer transportation battalions on the Eastern Front. In the twenty-first century, Russian soldiers continue to train with reindeer sleds in winter. In traditional festive legend, Santa Claus's reindeer pull a sleigh through the night sky to help Santa Claus deliver gifts to children on Christmas Eve.
- Elephants are used for logging in Southeast Asia.
- Less often, camels and llamas have been trained to harness. According to Juan Ignacio Molina the Dutch captain Joris van Spilbergen observed the use of chiliquenes (a llama type) by native Mapuches of Mocha Island as plough animals in 1614.

Assorted wild animals have, on occasion, been tamed and trained to harness, including zebras and even moose.

=== Guard animals ===
As some domesticated animals display extremely protective or territorial behavior, certain breeds and species have been utilized to guard people and/or property such as homes, public buildings, businesses, crops, livestock and even venues of criminal activity. Guard animals can either act as alarms to alert their owners of danger or they can be used to actively scare off and/or even attack encroaching intruders or dangerous animals. Well known examples of guard animals include dogs, geese and llamas.

=== Powering fixed machinery ===
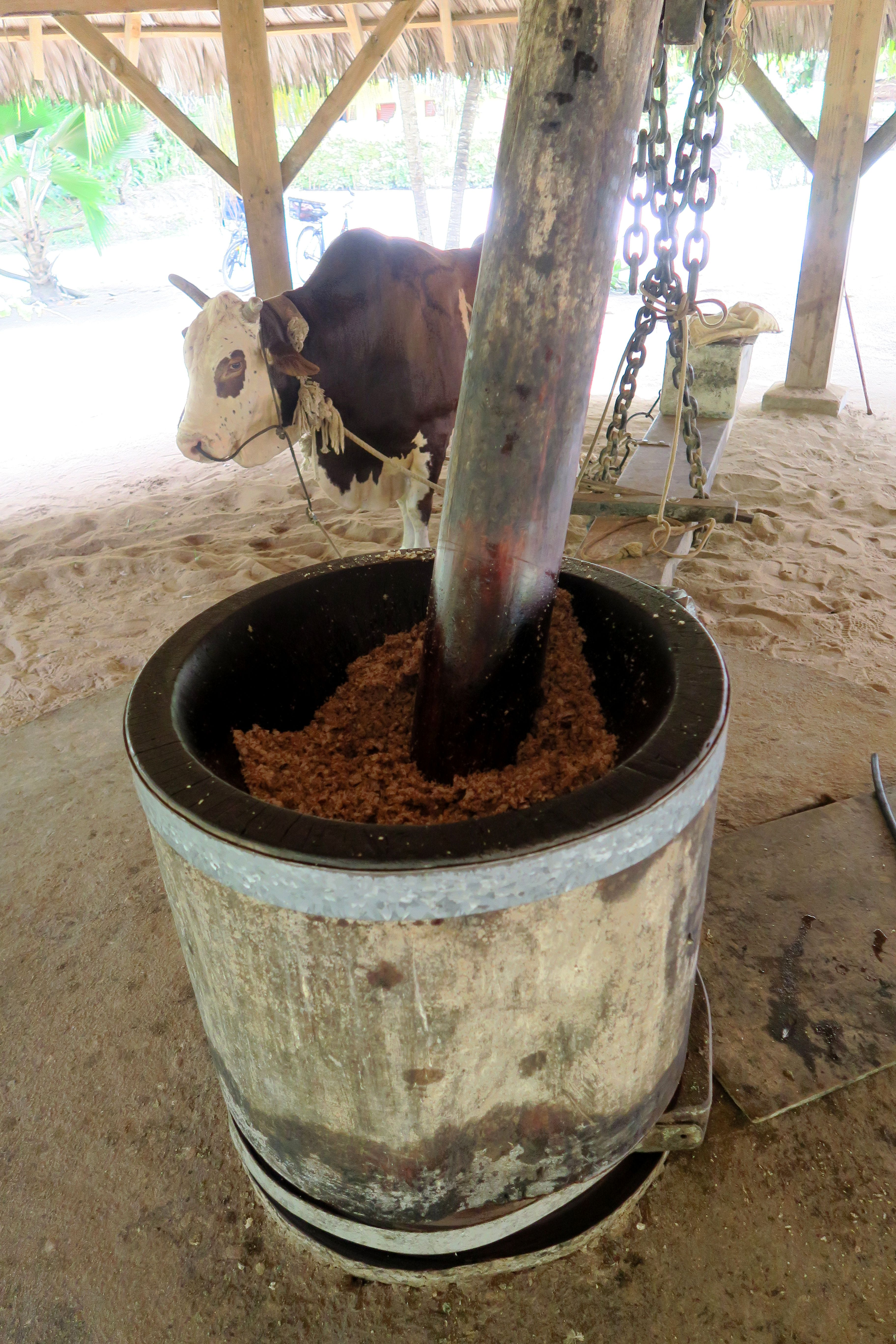
An ox-powered Copra press

Working draught animals may power fixed machinery using a treadmill and have been used throughout history to power a winch to raise water from a well. Turnspit dogs were formerly used to power roasting jacks for roasting meat.

=== Treatment animals ===
Working as a form of biological treatment for the environment. Animals such as Asian carps were imported to the U.S. in 1970s to control algae, weed, and parasite growth in aquatic farms, weeds in canal systems, and as one form of sewage treatment.

=== Pathogens and diseases ===
Animals can be used to detect the presence of pathogens and patients carrying infectious diseases.

- Dogs (including scent hounds) and bees have been trained to detect COVID-19 infections.
- Dogs have been trained to detect cancer. One study reported ants could be used to detect cancer via urine.
- Detection rats such as those trained by APOPO can also be taught to identify diseases, especially pulmonary tuberculosis.

=== Searching and retrieving ===
Dogs and pigs, with a better sense of smell than humans, can assist with gathering by finding valuable products, such as truffles (a very expensive subterranean fungus). The French typically use truffle hogs, while Italians mainly use dogs. Monkeys are trained to pick coconuts from palm trees, a job many human workers consider as too dangerous.

==== Detecting contraband ====
Detection dogs, commonly employed by law enforcement authorities, are trained to use their senses to detect illegal drugs, explosives, currency, and contraband electronics such as illicit mobile phones, among other things. The sense most used by detection dogs is smell, hence such dogs are also commonly known as 'sniffer dogs'. For this task, dogs may sometimes be used remotely from the suspect item, for example via the Remote Air Sampling for Canine Olfaction (RASCO) system.

=== Interfacing and organization ===
==== Assistance animals ====
- The best-known example is the guide dog or seeing eye dog for blind people. See also service dog. Miniature horses are also occasionally used for this purpose as well.
- Trained dogs and African, Asian, and American monkeys, such as capuchin monkeys have been taught to provide other functions for impaired people, such as opening mail and minor household tasks of the same like.

==== Herding ====
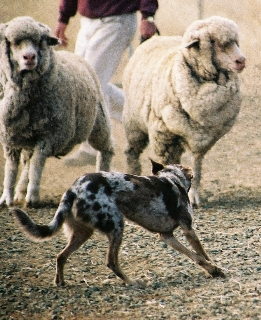
A Koolie dog working with sheep

- A very close working relationship exists between a stockman or shepherd, a herding dog, and the herd (or mob) of sheep or cattle. Cattle and sheep herders in other parts of the world also use various dog breeds.
- Certain breeds of horses also have an innate "cow sense" that allows them to effectively carry a rider to the right place at the right time to muster (gather or round up) livestock. See stock horse; cutting horse

=== Police and military ===
The defensive and offensive capabilities of animals (such as fangs and claws) can be used to protect or to attack humans.

- The guard dog barks or attacks, to warn of an intruder, sniffer dogs are used to detect explosives contraband and attack dogs are trained to attack on command.
- War elephants were trained for battle in ancient times and are still used for military transport today.
- Military uses of horses have changed over the millennia but still continue, including for police work.
- Camel cavalry was used in deserts since they had better performance and survivability in the harsh desert environment than horses. India's Border Security Force and some other countries still used camel cavalry for patrolling in the Thar Desert.
- Dolphins and sea lions carry markers to attach to naval mines as well as patrolling harbors.
- Dogs can be trained to find landmines.
- Rats, which are lighter and less of a risk to set the mines off, have recently been used more frequently.
- Homing pigeons transport material, usually messages on small pieces of paper, by air.

== Legal status ==
In some jurisdictions, certain working animals are afforded greater legal rights than other animals. One such common example is police dogs and military dogs, which are often afforded additional protections and the same memorial services as human officers and soldiers.

India law have provision for the in loco parentis for implementing animal welfare laws. Under the Indian law the non-human entities such as animals, deities, trusts, charitable organizations, corporate, managing bodies, etc. and several other non-human entitles have been given the status of the "legal person" with legal rights and duties, such as to sue and be sued, to own and transfer the property, to pay taxes, etc. In court cases regarding animals, the animals have the status of "legal person" and humans have the legal duty to act as "loco parentis" towards animals welfare like a parent has towards the minor children. In a case of cow-smuggling, the Punjab and Haryana High Court mandated that "entire animal kingdom including avian and aquatic" species has a "distinct legal persona with corresponding rights, duties, and liabilities of a living person" and humans are "loco parentis" while laying out the norms for animal welfare, veterinary treatment, fodder and shelter, e.g. animal drawn carriages must not have more than four humans, and load carrying animals must not be loaded beyond the specified limits and those limits must be halved when animals have to carry the load up a slope. A court while deciding the Animal Welfare Board of India vs Nagaraja case in 2014 mandated that animals are also entitled to the fundamental right to freedom enshrined in the Article 21 of Constitution of India i.e. right to life, personal liberty and the right to die with dignity (passive euthanasia). In another case, a court in Uttarakhand state mandated that animals have the same rights as humans.

== See also ==
- Service animal – Animal to assist people with disabilities
- Animal rights – Rights belonging to animals
- Animal sentinel – Organisms used to detect risks to humans
- Animals in film and television
- Animals in sport – Sports that involve use of animals
- Biological pest control – Controlling pests using other organisms
- Draft horse – Large horse bred for heavy work
- Cruelty to animals – Negligent or abusive action against animals by humans
- Commercial animal cloning – Commercial cloning of animals
- Donkey rides – British beach entertainment feature
- Experiment (horse-powered boat) – Horse-powered boat
- Horse-drawn boat – Canal boat pulled by a horse on a towpath
- Horse-drawn vehicle – Vehicle pulled by one or more horses
- Horseboating Society – Society promoting horse-drawn boating
- Hymenoptera training – Bees or wasps trained to detect dangerous substances
- List of domesticated animals
- Mixed farming – Economic activity
- Non-human electoral candidate – Candidate proposed for satire or protest
- Pet culture – Interaction of humans and pets
- Working cat – Domestic cat kept primarily for pest control rather than companionship
- Working dog – Dog trained to perform practical tasks
- Drafting dog – Dog bred for a specific type of work
- Seizure response dog – Assists person during or immediately before or after a seizure
- Guard dog – Working dog
- Scent hound – Dog type, hunting dog
- Working rat – Trained animal
- Truffle hog – Domestic pig trained to find edible fungi
- Pack animal – Individual or type of working animal used by humans
- Jack (baboon) – Chacma baboon and mobility aid (died 1890)
