= Remote Air Sampling for Canine Olfaction =

Remote Air Sampling for Canine Olfaction or RASCO (sometimes RASCargO or -in the UK- REST (Remote Explosives Scent Tracing) is a technology for transport security.

== Function ==
The system allows explosives to be detected in the context of transport facilities, specifically within any closed volume being transported, typically transport containers.

== Summary of technique ==
Samples of air from within a container are remotely collected and presented to a suitably trained 'sniffer dog', which will provide an alert if it senses the presence of target material, e.g. explosives.

== History ==
The approach was developed by the Transport Security Division of the Department for Transport, Local Government and the Regions (TRANSEC) for the UK government in the late 1990s. The company 'Kent K9 Detection Services' offers a RASCO system, and an evolved version is fielded by Chilport for remote air sampling, known as VODS and described as 'an approved variant of the RASCO System'. Towards assessing best practice, the US Coastguard reviewed the system and wrote a brief summary report in 2006. DHL mentions its use, and in 'Air Cargo World' it is described as a specifically UK and European approach to security.
