= Detection dog =

Dog trained to detect certain substances

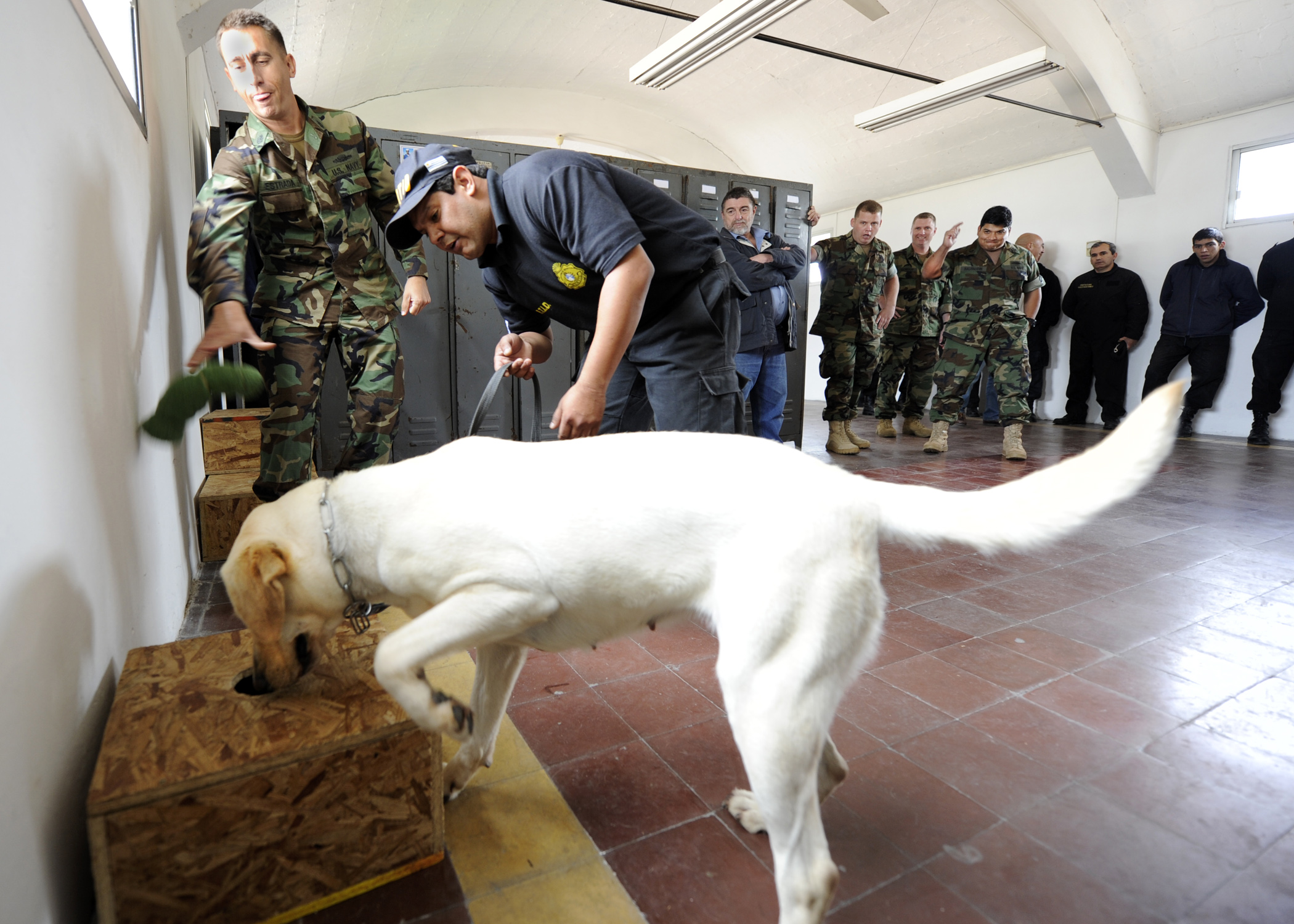
Dog training for drug detection with the United States Navy

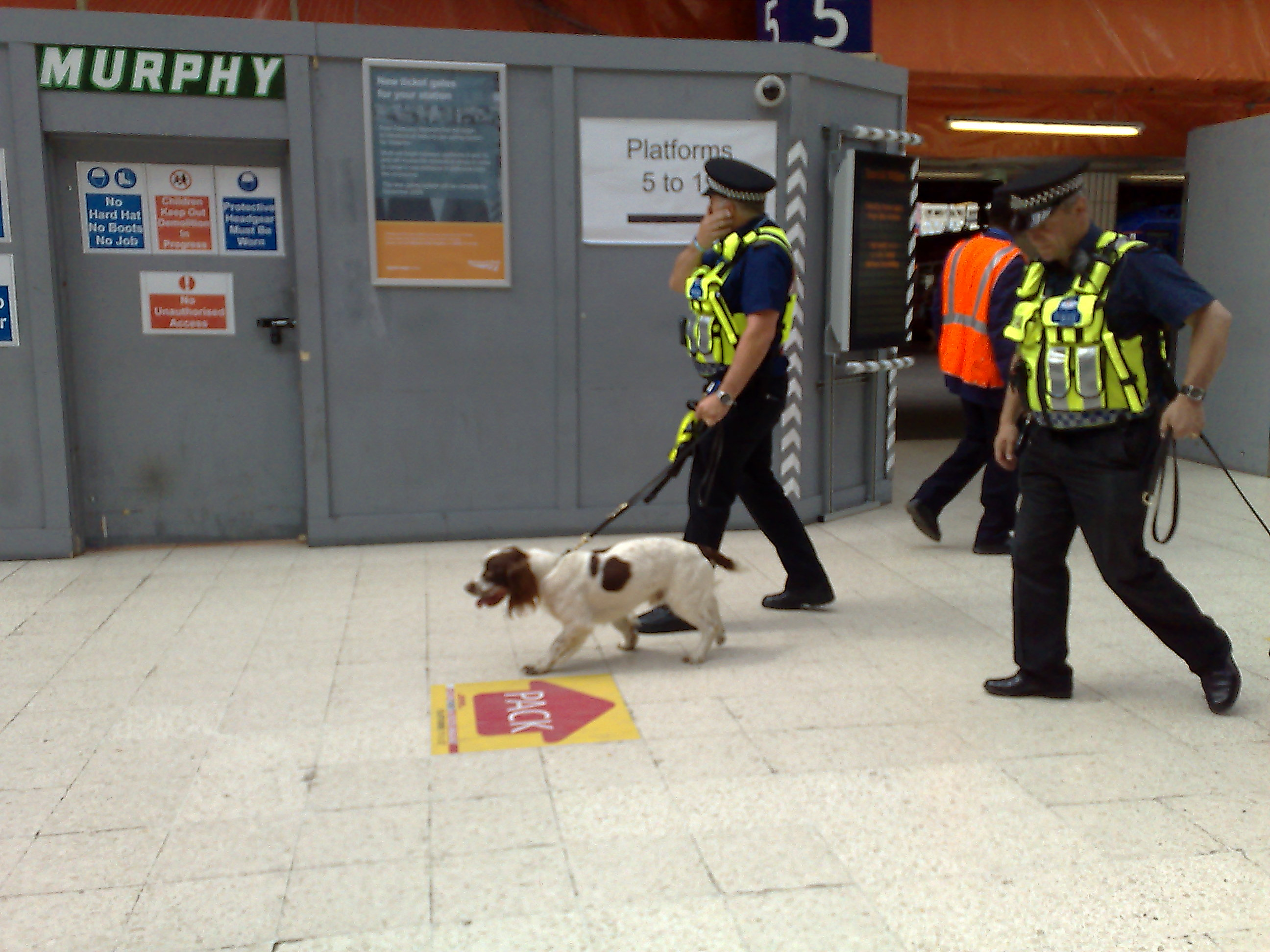
An English Springer Spaniel on duty as a detection dog with the British Transport Police at Waterloo station

A detection dog or sniffer dog is a dog that is trained to use its senses to detect substances such as explosives, illegal drugs, wildlife scat, semen, currency, blood, and contraband electronics, such as illicit mobile phones. The sense most used by detection dogs is smell. Hunting dogs that search for game, and search and rescue dogs that work to find missing humans are generally not considered detection dogs but fit instead under their own categories. There is some overlap, as in the case of cadaver dogs, trained to search for human remains.

A police dog is essentially a detection dog that is used as a resource, for police in specific scenarios such as conducting drug raids, finding missing criminals, and locating stashed currency. Frequently, detection dogs are thought to be used for law enforcement purposes. Experts say that dog-sniff evidence should not be used in the criminal justice system, pointing to wrongful convictions, human biases that skew animal behavior, and the lack of systematic research into what dogs detect or how they do it.

Although detection dogs are often used for law enforcement purposes, they are also used as a valuable research tool for wildlife biologists. In California, detection dogs are trained to discover quagga mussels on boats at public boat ramps because they are a harmful invasive species for the environment. Detection dogs also tend to be employed for the purposes of finding and collecting the feces of a diverse array of species, including caribou, black-footed ferret, killer whale, and Oregon spotted frog. This process is known as wildlife scat detection.

== Functions ==
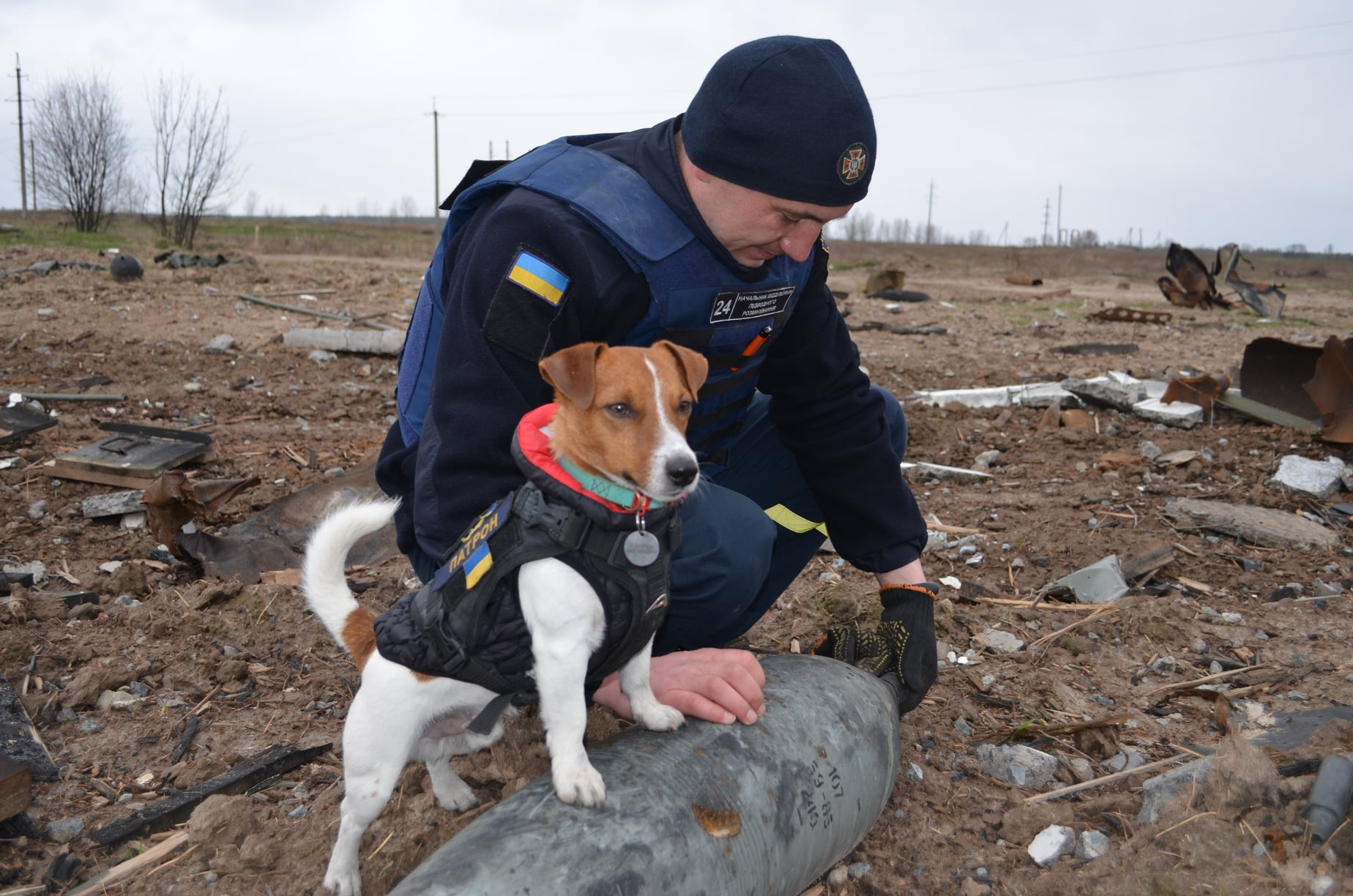
Ukrainian sapper with a landmine finder dog Patron in Ukraine after battle during the 2022 Russian invasion

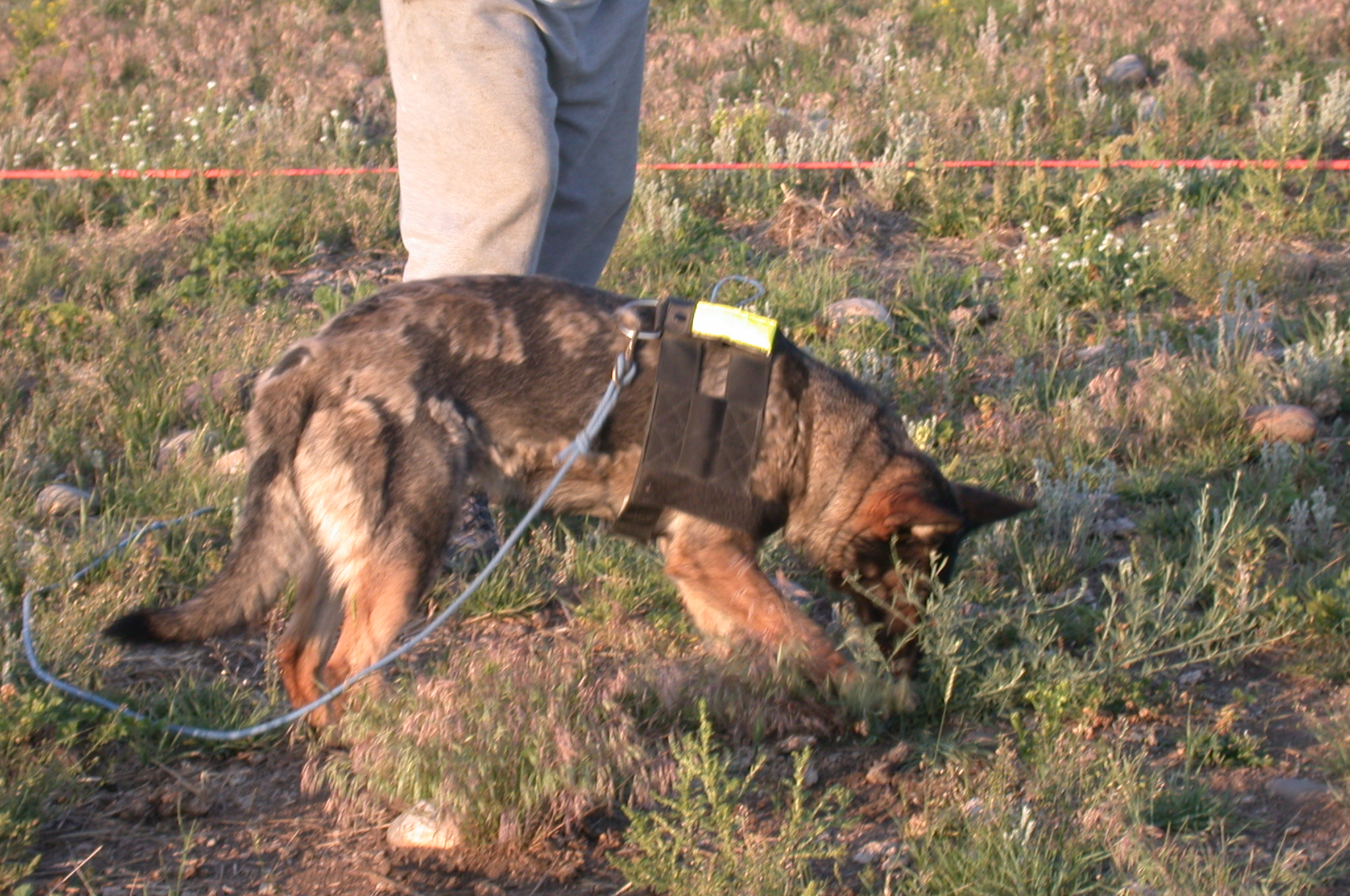
Knapweed Nightmare noxious weed detection dog wearing GPS tracking harness

Detection dogs have been trained to search for many things, both animate and inanimate, including:

- Bed bugs
- Cancer
- Currency (e.g. large amounts of money carried by passengers in airports that should be declared to customs)
- Drugs
- Endangered animal species (e.g., black-footed ferret)
- Explosives
- Fire accelerants (e.g., arson investigation)
- Firearms
- Gourmet fungi, such as truffles (e.g. French black truffle (Tuber melanosporum), Italian white truffle (Tuber magnatum), chanterelles (Cantharellus cibarius), porcini (Boletus edulis), morels (Morchella esculenta), and other varieties of mushroom.
- Human remains
- Invasive species (e.g., quagga mussel)
- Ivory
- Mineral desposits
- Mobile phones (e.g. as contraband in prisons)
- Mold
- Plants, animals, produce, and agricultural items that have to go through customs
- SIM cards
- Termites
- Diabetes
- USB drives
- Wildlife scat

Sniffer dogs can be trained to locate small infestations of invasive and non-native weeds. The world's first spotted knapweed canine detection program successfully completed field-testing for Montana State University in 2004. Upon completion of the testing, Knapweed Nightmare was finding low densities of non-native invasive knapweed rosettes in the field with a 93% overall success rate. She followed it up with 98% in the final trials in open fields, demonstrating that dogs can effectively detect low densities of invasive plants.

Detection dogs are able to discern individual scents even when the scents are combined or masked by other odors. In 2002, a detection dog foiled a woman's attempt to smuggle marijuana into an Australian prison in Brisbane. The marijuana had been inserted into a balloon, which was smeared with coffee, pepper, and petroleum jelly and then placed in her bra.

=== Bed bug detection dogs ===
Detection dogs are often specially trained by handlers to identify the scent of bed bugs. With the increased focus on green pest management and integrated pest management, as well as the increase in global travel and shared living accommodations, bed bugs have become more prevalent. Detecting bed bugs is a complicated process because insects have the ability to hide almost anywhere. Detection dogs help solve this problem because of their size, speed, and sense of smell. Detection dogs use their unique ability to smell in parts per trillion in order to track bed bugs in every phase of their life cycle. They can find bugs in places humans cannot such as wall voids, crevices, and furniture gaps. Dogs are also a safer alternative to pesticide use. If detection dogs can find out exactly where bed bugs are located, they can minimize the area that needs to be sprayed.

The National Pest Management Association released their "Bed Bug Best Management Practices" in 2011 which outlines the minimum recommendations regarding not only treatment, but the certification and use of bed bug detection canines. The NPMA's Best Management Practices emphasizes the importance of having bed bug detection dog teams certified by third party organizations who are not affiliated to the trainer or company that sold the canine.

Scientists at the University of Kentucky reviewed studies on bed bug detection dogs and concluded that although expensive for operators, they are a reliable source as long as they undergo the proper training. In another study, detection dogs had a 97.5% correct positive indication rate on identifying bed bugs (Cimex lectularius) and their eggs – with zero false positives – all while accurately distinguishing them from carpenter ants, cockroaches, and termites. They also successfully differentiated live bed bugs and viable bed bug eggs from dead bed bugs, cast skins, and feces with a 95% correct positive indication rate.

Bed bug detection dogs should be certified by a national organization like the World Detector Dog Organization (WDDO) or the National Entomology Scent Detection Canine Association (NESDCA). There are a few independent K9 bed bug inspection companies that have multiple certifications.

=== Wildlife scat detection ===
Scat is abundant in the wild and contains valuable data. Wildlife scat detection represents a fairly non-invasive method of study for many species where live-capture once predominated. Compared with other methods of scat collection, dogs are able to survey larger areas in less time at decreased costs. Research shows that detection dogs can find laboratory rats and mice in a large rodent-free area of 32 hectares (79 acres). Some specific types of feces that detection dogs have had success in identifying include killer whale feces, northern spotted owl pellets, and salamanders.

=== COVID-19 detection ===
Some countries have trained dogs to detect COVID-19, with Australia using them at airports in 2021.

In March 2022, researchers in Paris reported in a preprint that had not yet been peer-reviewed that trained dogs were very effective for rapidly detecting the presence of SARS-Cov2 in people, whether they were displaying symptoms or not. The dogs were presented with sweat samples to smell from 335 people, of whom 78 with symptoms and 31 without tested positive by PCR. The dogs detected 97% of the symptomatic and 100% of the asymptomatic infections. They were 91% accurate at identifying volunteers who were not infected, and 94% accurate at ruling out the infection in people without symptoms. The authors said "Canine testing is non-invasive and provides immediate and reliable results. Further studies will be focused on direct sniffing by dogs to evaluate sniffer dogs for mass pre-test in airports, harbors, railways stations, cultural activities, or sporting events."

== Criticism ==
=== Accuracy ===
==== Australia ====
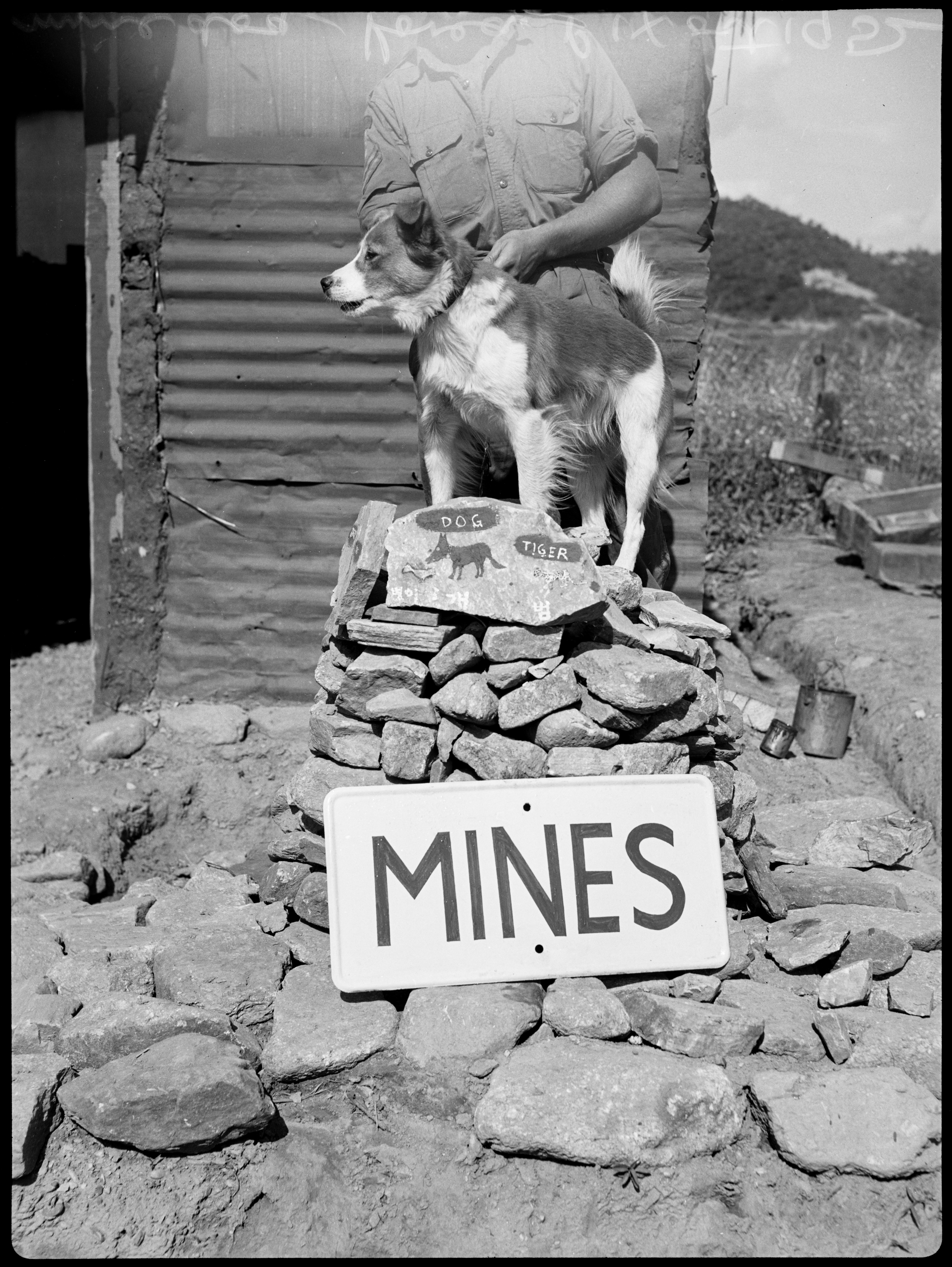
Landmine dog 'tiger', Australian Army, Korea, 1952

Police and a drug detection dog at Newtown train station in Sydney in 2017

In 2001, the Australian state of New South Wales introduced legislation that granted police the power to use drug detection dogs without a warrant in public places such as licensed venues (venues licensed to serve alcohol), music festivals, and public transport.

The law was reviewed in 2006 by the New South Wales Ombudsman, who handed down a critical report regarding the use of dogs for drug detection. The report stated that prohibited drugs were found in only 26% of searches following an indication by a drug sniffer dog. Of these, 84% were for small amounts of cannabis deemed for personal use. Subsequent figures obtained from NSW Police in 2023 revealed that between 1 January 2013 and 30 June 2023, officers had conducted 94,535 personal searches (refers to both strip searches and less invasive frisk or "general" searches) resulting from drug detection dog indications, with only 25% resulting in illicit drugs being found.

In late 2014, reports were first published alleging that NSW Police were routinely using drug detection dog indications as a justification for conducting invasive strip searches, particularly at major events such as music festivals (see New South Wales Police Force strip search scandal). Data obtained from NSW Police shows that between 1 July 2014 and 30 June 2020, officers conducted 27,835 strip searches "in the field" (outside of a police station). Separate data shows that during the same six-year period, officers conducted 5659 strip searches resulting from drug detection dog indications.

In October 2018, the Law Enforcement Conduct Commission launched a formal investigation into the use of strip searches by NSW Police. In a final report handed down in December 2020, the commission found that there had been a "significant increase" in the "number and proportion" of strip searches carried out following drug detection dog indications in the five years between 2014 and 2019. In July 2022, a class action was filed in the Supreme Court of New South Wales on behalf of patrons strip searched at music festivals by NSW Police from July 2016 onwards. Head plaintiff for the class action is a then 27-year-old woman who was wrongly strip searched at the Splendour in the Grass music festival in 2018 after being stopped by a drug detection dog.

==== United States ====
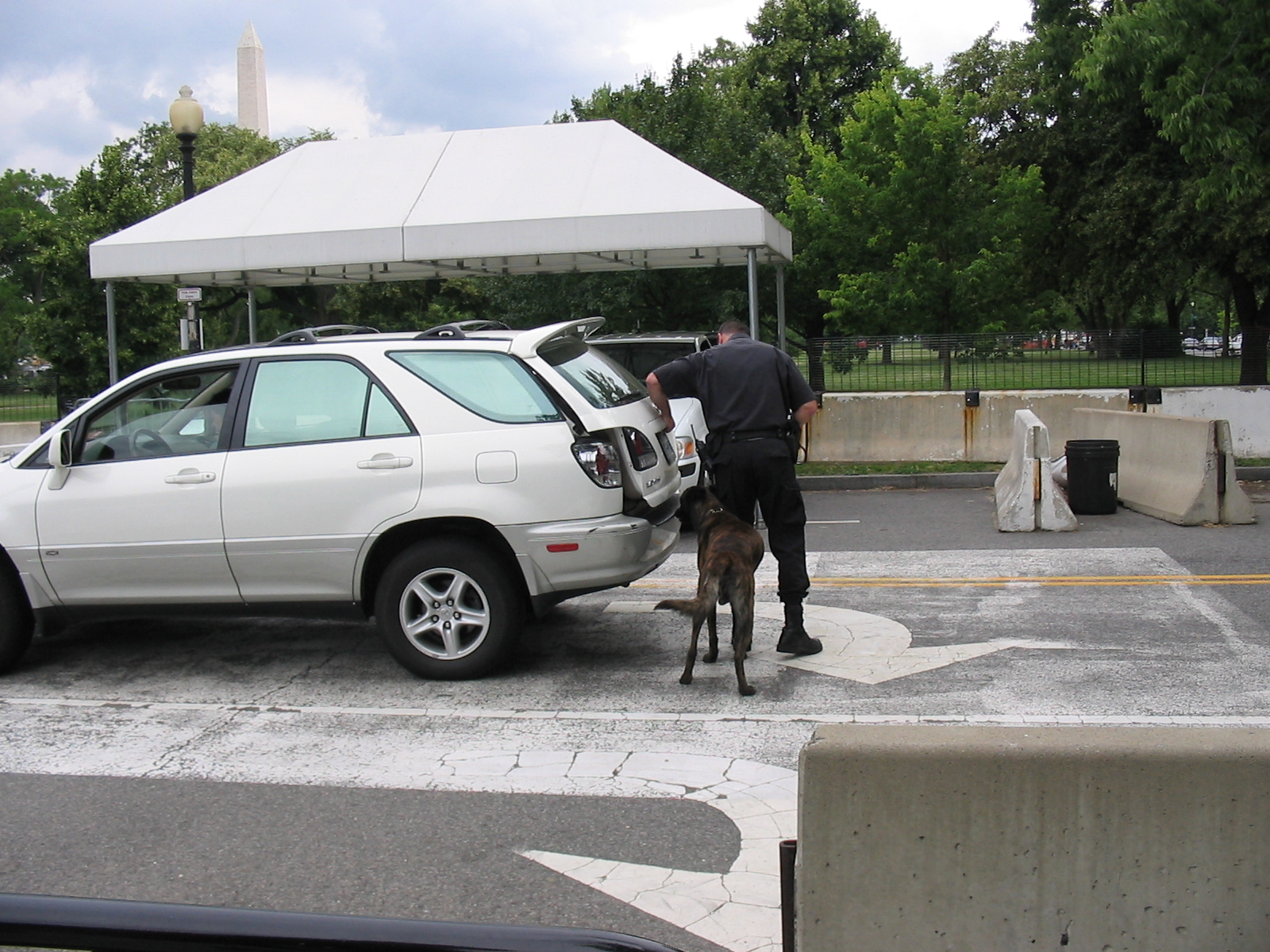
A detection dog searches a car for explosives at a checkpoint in Washington, D.C.

The 1983 Supreme Court decision United States v. Place ruled that it did not violate a person's Fourth Amendment rights to have a dog sniff a person's luggage or property in a public place without a search warrant or probable cause. This was extended to include routine traffic stops in Illinois v. Caballes (2005), provided it does not unreasonably prolong the duration of the stop. In his dissent, Justice David Souter observed:

The infallible dog, however, is a creature of legal fiction. Although the Supreme Court of Illinois did not get into the sniffing averages of drug dogs, their supposed infallibility is belied by judicial opinions describing well-trained animals sniffing and alerting with less than perfect accuracy, whether owing to errors by their handlers, the limitations of the dogs themselves, or even the pervasive contamination of currency by cocaine.

In 2011, civil rights activists claimed that detection dogs responses are influenced by the biases and behaviors of their handlers, which can hinder accuracy. Another factor that affects accuracy is residual odors. Residual odors can linger even after illegal materials have been removed from a particular area, and can lead to false alarms. Additionally, very few states have mandatory training, testing, or certification standards for detection dogs. This leaves people to question whether they are truly equipped to carry out searches.

The question of the reliability of drug detection dogs was examined in 2013 in the Supreme Court case Florida v. Harris, which held that courts can presume the accuracy of an alert from a dog that has certification or undergone continuing training. Several amicus briefs argued that drug dogs show poor accuracy in the field, with up to 80% of alerts being false positives. Also in 2013, the Supreme Court ruled in Florida v. Jardines that having a drug dog sniff the front porch of a private home is considered to be a search within the meaning of the Fourth Amendment, requiring both probable cause and a search warrant.

False alerts by dogs have led to wrongful convictions.

Sniffer dogs can be trained to detect crop pests and diseases. A study by the US Department of Agriculture found that sniffer dogs identified trees infected with citrus greening disease with 99% accuracy; they could detect infection as early as two weeks after onset.

=== Civil rights ===
Detection dogs give police the potential to conduct searches without cause, in a manner that is unregulated. They are often accused of being motivated more by the state's desire to be seen doing something than by any serious desire to respond to the dangers of drug use. In June 2012, three Nevada Highway Patrol officers filed suit against Nevada's Director of Public Safety, alleging that he violated the police dog program by intentionally training canines to be "trick ponies" – to falsely alert based on cues from their handlers (Clever Hans effect) – so as to enable officers to conduct illegal searches of vehicles. The lawsuit claims that in doing so, he and other top Highway Patrol officers had violated the federal Racketeer Influenced and Corrupt Organizations Act (RICO Act).

In Norway, students were subjected to a drug search in their classroom by a detection dog. The students didn't have to be present in the room while the dogs searched; however, they were forced to answer questions by the police instead. An article in Tidsskrift for strafferett, Norway's journal of criminal law, claims that such searches breach Norwegian law.

Detector dogs have been used by secret police and security services to support campaigns of political persecution. For example, sweat collected from subjects following interrogation was used by the Stasi to train dogs to respond to their scent.

== See also ==
- Canine cancer detection – Practice of using dogs' senses of smell to detect cancer
- Clever Hans effect - animals responding to human cues
- Demining – Process of removing land mines
- Diabetes alert dog – Assistance dog trained to monitor humans
- Dogs in warfare
- Florida v. Harris
- Florida v. Jardines
- Lucky and Flo – Detection dogs
- Mine clearance agency – Organization that removes landmines
- Nosework – Dog sport
- Police dog – Dog trained and used for law enforcement
- Working dog – Dog trained to perform practical tasks
