= Knapweed Nightmare =

Dog trained to detect non-native invasive weeds

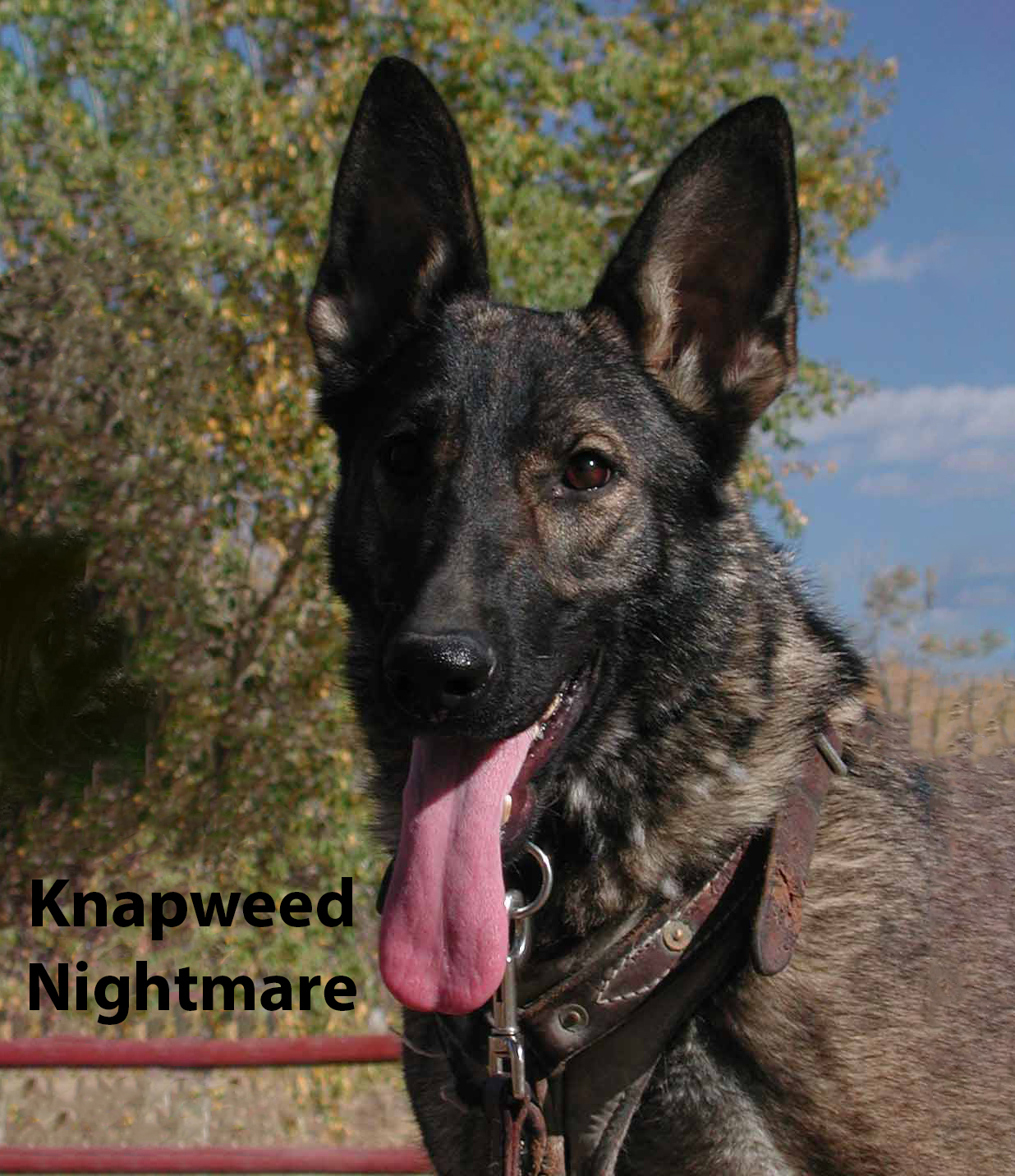
- Species: Domestic dog
- Breed: German Shepherd
- Sex: Female
- Born: Nightmare
- Occupation: Detection dog
- Employer: Montana State University

Knapweed Nightmare was the first dog trained "to locate a plant within a plant community" which enabled her to track down low densities of invasive non-native noxious weeds. Nightmare is a sable shepherd dog trained by Montana based, Rocky Mountain Command Dogs.

== Description ==
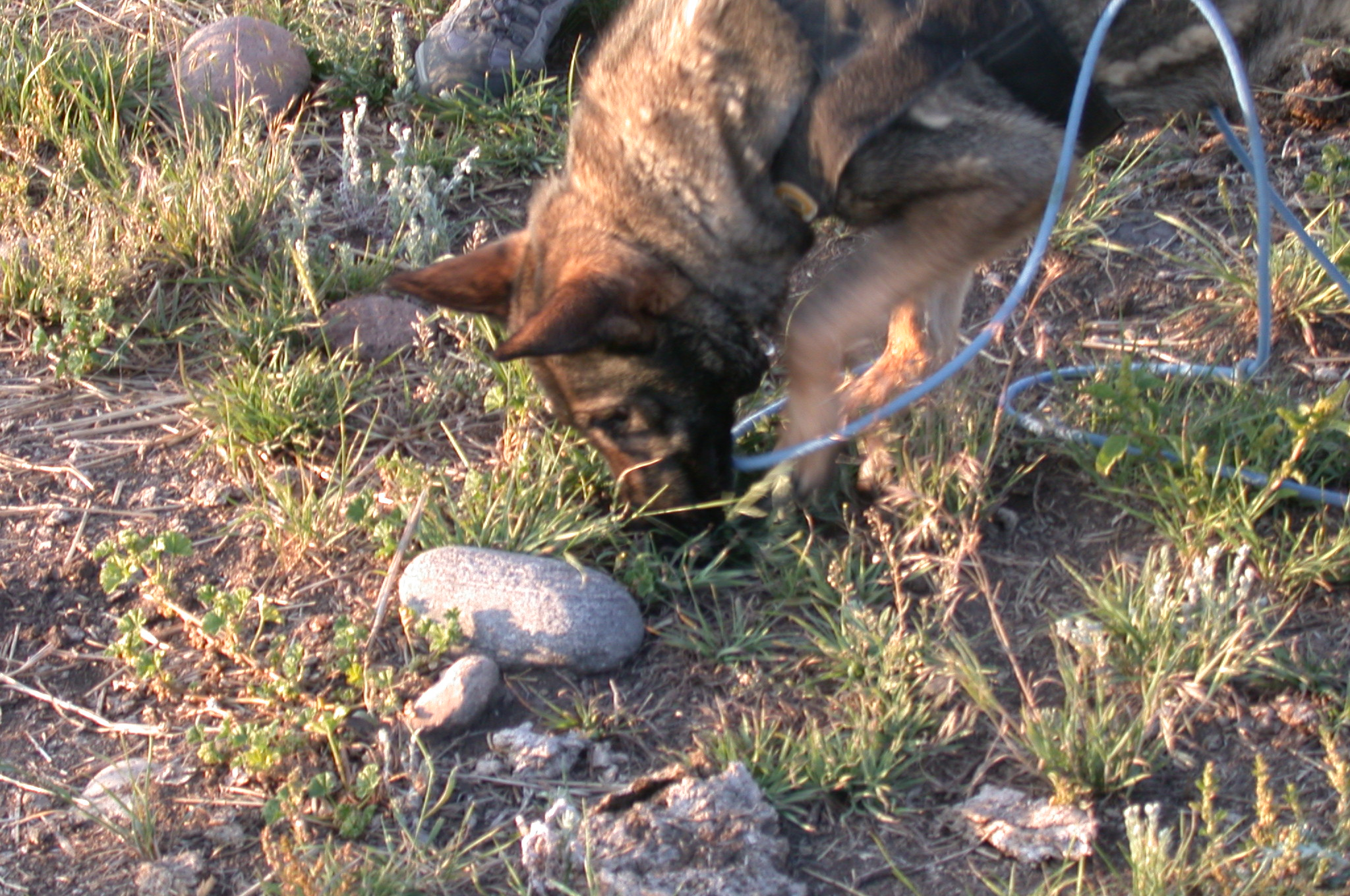
Knapweed Nightmare noxious weed detection dog

The concept that detection dogs could be used to sniff out invasive non-native weeds in the same manner they can be trained to locate drugs and bombs came from Kim Goodwin, weed prevention coordinator at Montana State University Bozeman.

Goodwin pitched her idea of using dogs for locating spotted knapweed (Centaurea stoebe) to a local dog trainer in 2003 and the two started working on the project. Nightmare, a shepherd dog in training for scent detection, was chosen to detect the invasive weed.

== Process ==
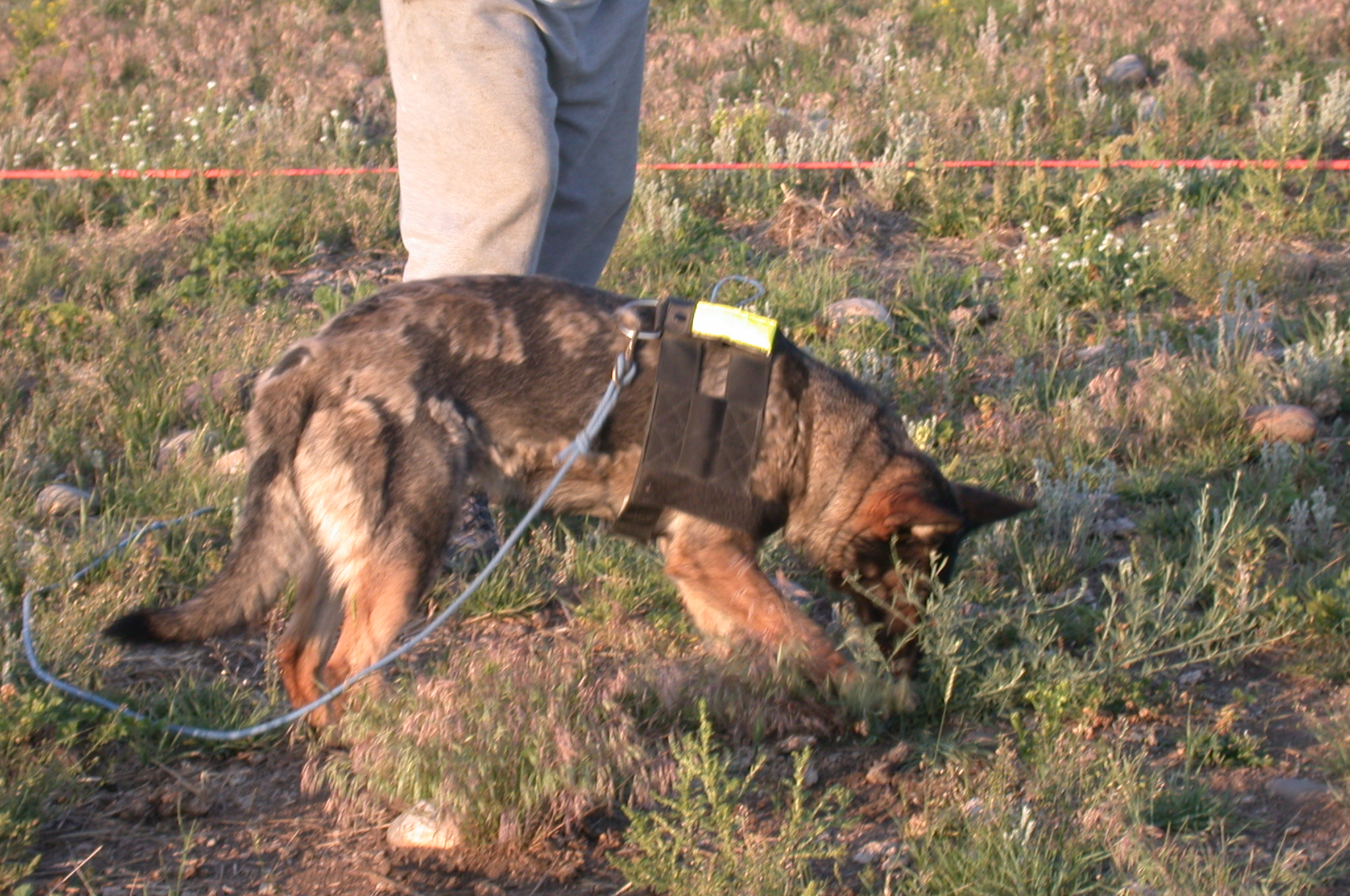
Knapweed Nightmare wearing a GPS tracking harness

For scent work training, her trainer Hal Steiner uses largely positive dog training methods. Without employing food rewards to entice the dog to search for the knapweed, a technique called "game theory" is employed. The dog's attention is fixed to a particular object, like a towel or a piece of plastic tubing that has knapweed wrapped inside. When the dog responds to the scented toy, handlers give her praise. The toy is then concealed in increasingly difficult-to-find locations.

The knapweed detection dog was taught a little differently than normal scent detection dogs- spending at least 10 seconds digging at a rosette of knapweed allows the global positioning system (GPS) attached to her collar to indicate the location of a knapweed find.

Since Nightmare was expected to work on her own out in a large pasture locating small rosettes of knapweed as it invaded an area, she needed to be able to cover the field without chasing after wildlife or stray scents. As her proficiency increased, the trainers added various distractions, to help Nightmare learn to stay focused solely on her task.

== Accuracy ==
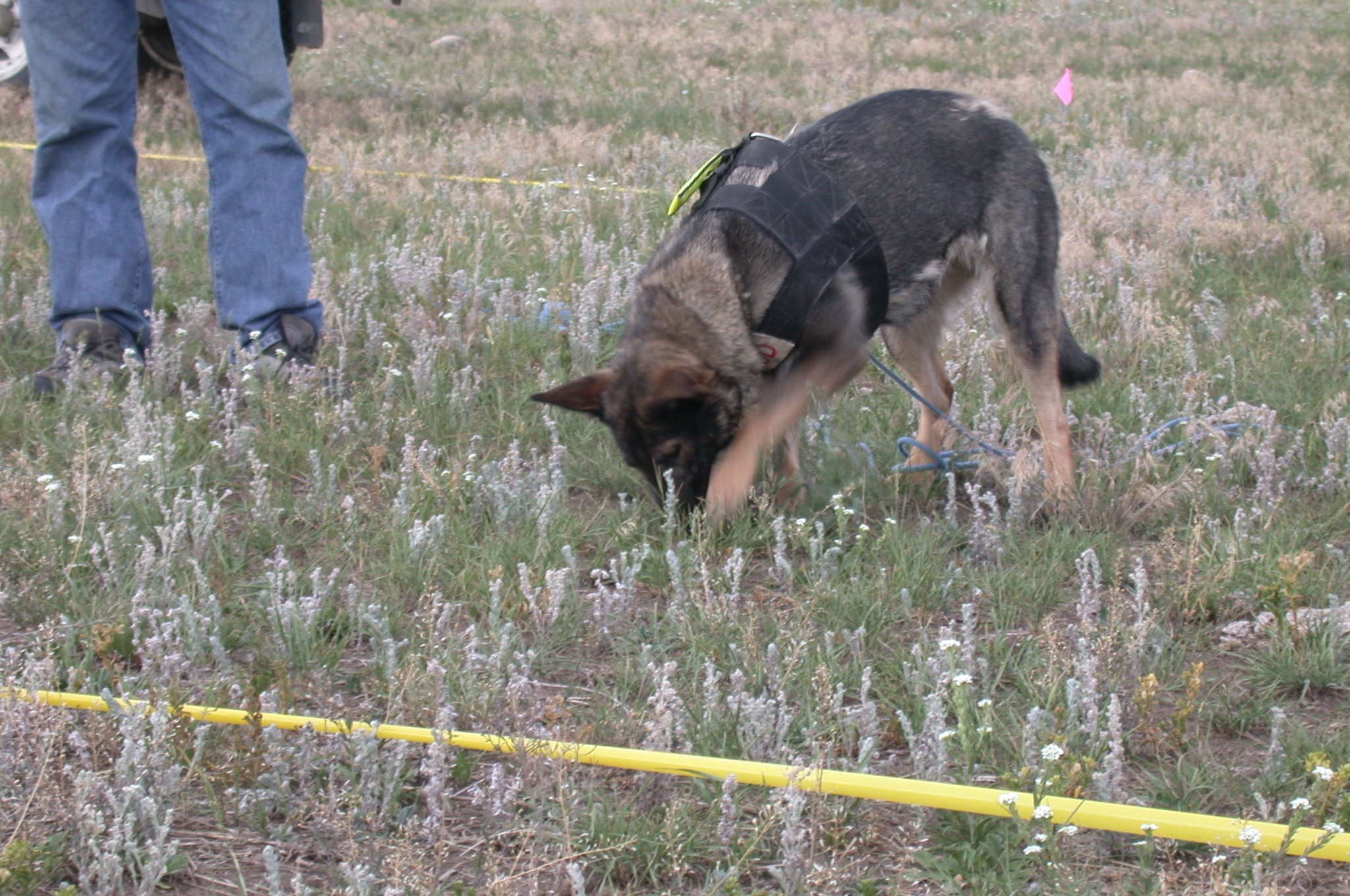
Knapweed Nightmare digging at spotted knapweed plant

Phase One of the knapweed detection program was successfully completed and field-tested in the fall of 2004. Nightmare has a 93 percent success rate overall in locating the invading non-native spotted knapweed. She followed it up with 98% in the final trials in open fields, demonstrating that dogs can effectively detect low densities of invasive plants.
