= Prospecting dog =

Dog trained to find mineral deposits

An prospecting dog is a dog that has been specially trained to aid prospectors in finding mineral deposits near but not on the surface of the ground. Many mineral ores (especially sulfide ores) emit a specific aroma that a dog can be trained to detect.

== History ==
The first dog trained for mineral prospecting was Lari, owned and trained by Pentti Mattsson in Finland by request of the geological survey of Finland to find sulphide boulders hidden beneath the overgrowth of peat.

A program was undertaken in 1962 by the Geological Survey of Finland (under the direction of A. Kahma and T. Mustonen) to determine if specially trained dogs could be used to detect on- or near-surface mineral deposits. Mattsson was recruited based on his recognized expertise in dog training. Mattsson concentrated his work on sulfide-bearing ores such as pyrite because of the unique aroma produced by the sulfide compounds. A series of experiments determined that the dogs were significantly better at finding ore-containing boulders than human prospectors.

Following the initial experimental success, the program was put into full production, using sixteen dogs over the course of 30 years (1964 to 1994). At its peak in the mid-1980s, the program was employing eight dogs simultaneously. Mattsson's methods were adapted in the UK to the training of the world's first drug detection dogs.

In a retrospective study of the original research, Valkama and Ojala found that the dogs had an effective career of six years, working six months per year. By 1994, the program had been abandoned because the training and upkeep costs of the dogs was considered prohibitively expensive.

Prospecting dogs also have been used in archaeological prospecting and for sulphide-bearing boulders in glacial moraine.

== Sources ==
- Lari - Lohkare-etsijä [Lari - a prospecting dog]. Finland: Geological Survey of Finland. 1966.
- Hyvärinen, Lauri (30 June 1969). "Report on the study of the effectiveness of prospecting dogs" (PDF). Geological Survey of Finland.
