= Canine cancer detection =

Practice of using dogs' senses of smell to detect cancer

Canine cancer detection is an approach to cancer screening that relies upon the claimed olfactory ability of dogs to detect, in urine or in breath, very low concentrations of the alkanes and aromatic compounds generated by malignant tumors. While some research has been promising, no verified studies by secondary research groups have substantiated the validity of positive, conclusive results.

== Background ==
=== Media coverage ===
The proposal that dogs can detect cancer attracted widespread coverage in the general media. In 2015 the Huffington Post reported that studies have suggested that dogs may be able to detect lung cancer, melanoma, breast cancer and bladder cancer, and that dogs can be trained to detect cancer in 93% of cases. In 2016, actress Shannen Doherty told Entertainment Tonight in an interview that her dog identified her breast cancer before doctors could diagnose it. National Geographic said that "man's best friend can detect various cancers, including prostate cancer, colorectal cancer and melanoma."

On the other hand, a 2016 review by Australian Popular Science found that the more rigorous trials produced less positive results. Another trial reported in Nature World News found disappointing results, but nevertheless "the researchers... believe that one day, dogs can still detect lung cancer."

CNN reported in 2016 that Britain's National Health Service is behind one of the largest clinical trials of canine cancer detection.

== Research ==
Although the first suggestion of this approach in a medical journal, The Lancet, dates back to 1989, there were only occasional publications on the subject in the next decade.

However, two studies (one published in 2004 and one in 2006), involving detection in urine, had promising results, with the 2006 report claiming a 99% accuracy in detecting lung cancer, although both studies were preliminary and involved small numbers of patients.

In a 2011 study, lung cancer was identified with a sensitivity of 71% and a specificity of 93%, using breath samples.

Research into canine VOC detection has informed the development of bio-AI hybrid platforms that pair trained detection dogs with artificial intelligence. In 2024, a prospective double-blind clinical study published in Scientific Reports evaluated one such system developed by SpotitEarly, a US biotech company. The study enrolled 1,400 participants and assessed the platform's ability to detect cancer in exhaled breath samples across four cancer types: breast, lung, prostate, and colorectal. The system demonstrated an average sensitivity of 94% and specificity of 94.3%, with performance at early disease stages comparable to established single-cancer screening modalities. The platform uses trained sniffer dogs as the primary biological sensor, monitored by integrated sensors that capture behavioral and physiological signals in real time; machine learning algorithms then translate these inputs into a standardized result. The researchers found that the approach relies on three core principles: the distinct molecular profile of cancer in exhaled breath, the canine olfactory system's ability to detect that profile, and AI-driven analysis of the dogs' responses.

== Skeptical analysis ==
In a May 25, 2012 article, “What to make of Medical Dogs” published by Science-Based Medicine, Peter Lipson reported on his review of the scientific literature regarding these claims and found valid support for positive conclusions to be lacking:

While anecdotes abound, there is scant literature to support this ability. One unimpressive pilot study looked at dogs’ potential ability to detect bladder cancers from urine samples. The idea behind cancer dogs is that there may be volatile compounds produced in cancer patients that dogs can detect by scent. In these studies, the compounds are not identified, not tested for, not named. There are many confounders, for example, in the few samples used, there may be other differences being detected by the dogs.

In the other study (I found very few) dogs were “trained” to detect lung and breast cancers in humans. The methodology of breath sampling is not validated as far as I can see, and once again, the putative compounds in breath are not identified. Statistically, the efficacy is marginal at best… I don’t doubt the social and emotional value of dogs as companions, and as active helpers in many circumstances. But beyond this, the evidence is wanting.

== See also ==
- Scent hound
